= Karlsruhe Congress =

International meeting of chemists in 1860

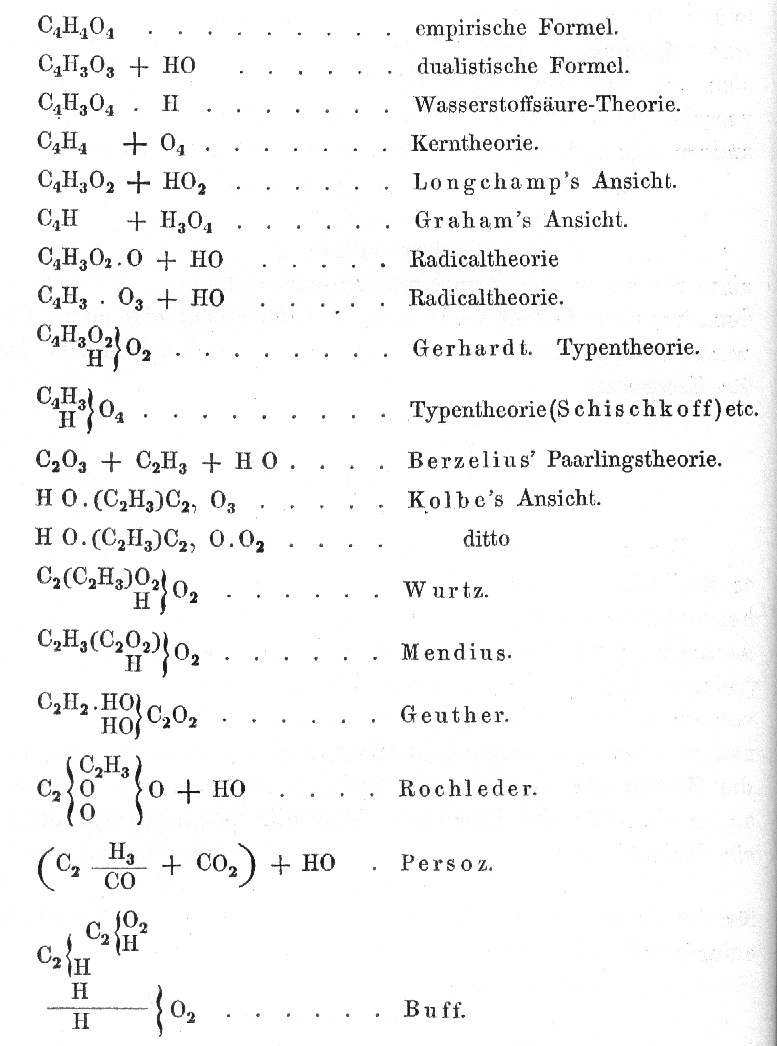
Formulas of acetic acid given by August Kekulé in 1861

The Karlsruhe Congress was an international meeting of chemists organized by August Kekulé and held in Karlsruhe, Germany from 3 to 5 September 1860. It was the first international conference of chemistry, with 140 participants.

The conference is known for the adoption of atomic weights in chemistry motivated by the participation of Stanislao Cannizzaro. During the congress he showed evidence using Avogadro's hypothesis, that certain gases were not made of atoms but of diatomic molecules.

Historian Aaron J. Ihde has argued that the Karlsruhe meeting was the first international meeting of chemists and that it led to the eventual founding of the International Union of Pure and Applied Chemistry (IUPAC).

== Organization and invitation ==
The Karlsruhe Congress was called so that European chemists could discuss matters of chemical nomenclature, notation, and atomic weights. The organization, invitation, and sponsorship of the conference were handled by August Kekulé, Adolphe Wurtz, and Karl Weltzien. As an example of the problems facing the delegates, Kekulé's Lehrbuch der Organischen Chemie gave nineteen different formulas used by chemists for acetic acid, as shown in the figure on this page.

An understanding was reached on the time and place of the meeting, and printing of a circular addressed to European chemists listed below, which explained the objectives and goals of an international congress was agreed upon. The circular concluded: "...with the aim of avoiding any unfortunate omissions, the undersigned request that the individuals to whom this circular will be sent please communicate it to their scientist friends who are duly authorized to attend the planned conference." The circular of the conference was sent to:

| Country | City | Scientists |
|---|---|---|
| Austria | Innsbruck | Heinrich Hlasiwetz |
| Austria | Vienna | Anton Schrötter von Kristelli |
| Austria | Vienna | Leopold von Pebal |
| Belgium | Brussels | Jean Servais Stas |
| Belgium | Ghent | Friedrich August Kekule von Stradonitz |
| France | Paris | Anselme Payen |
| France | Paris | Antoine Bussy |
| France | Paris | Antoine Jérôme Balard |
| France | Paris | Auguste André Thomas Cahours |
| France | Paris | Charles Adolphe Wurtz |
| France | Paris | Edmond Frémy |
| France | Paris | Eugéne-Melchior Péligot |
| France | Paris | Henri Étienne Sainte-Claire Deville |
| France | Paris | Henri Victor Regnault |
| France | Paris | Jean-Baptiste Boussingault |
| France | Paris | Jean-Baptiste Dumas |
| France | Paris | Louis Pasteur |
| France | Paris | Théophile-Jules Pelouze. |
| France | Rennes | Faustino Malaguti |
| Germany | Berlin | Eilhard Mitscherlich |
| Germany | Freiburg im Breisgau | Lambert Henrich von Babo |
| Germany | Giessen | Heinrich Will |
| Germany | Giessen | Hermann Franz Moritz Kopp |
| Germany | Göttingen | Friedrich Wöhler |
| Germany | Heidelberg | Robert Bunsen |
| Germany | Karlsruhe | Karl Weltzien |
| Germany | Leipzig | Otto Linné Erdmann |
| Germany | Munich | Justus von Liebig |
| Germany | Stuttgart | Hermann von Fehling |
| Germany | Tübingen | Adolph Strecker |
| Italy | Genova | Stanislao Cannizzaro |
| Italy | Turin | Raffaele Piria |
| Russia | Kasan | Nikolay Nikolayevich Beketov |
| Russia | St. Petersburg | Alexander Nikolayevich Engelhardt |
| Russia | St. Petersburg | Carl Julius Fritzsche |
| Russia | St. Petersburg | Nikolai Nikolaevich Sokolov |
| Russia | St. Petersburg | Nikolay Nikolaevich Zinin |
| Switzerland | Geneva | Jean Charles Galissard de Marignac |
| Switzerland | Zurich | Georg Andreas Karl Staedeler |
| United Kingdom | London | Alexander William Williamson |
| United Kingdom | London | August Wilhelm von Hofmann |
| United Kingdom | London | Sir Edward Frankland |
| United Kingdom | London | William Odling |
| United Kingdom | Manchester | Henry Enfield Roscoe |
| United Kingdom | Oxford | Sir Benjamin Collins Brodie, 2nd Baronet |

Of the above, only 20 of 45 attended.

== Meeting ==
=== First two days ===
The congress opened in the assembly hall of the Baden Parliament on 3 September, with Weltzien serving as the general secretary. In his address, he highlighted the international and discipline-specific nature of the meeting. Kekulé delivered an opening address. Wurtz documented the proceedings for future publication. A dinner for 120 people was held in the museum hall.

The next day, the assembly, led by Weltzien, discussed the committee's proposed theme of the day before regarding the disputed meanings of "atom," "molecule," and "equivalence." However, no conclusions were reached, leading the committee to meet twice on the same day. They decided to present three specific nomenclature proposals to the assembly for further consideration.

=== Last day ===
The Karlsruhe meeting started with no firm agreement on the vexing problem of atomic and molecular weights. However, on the meeting's last day reprints of Stanislao Cannizzaro's 1858 paper on atomic weights, in which he utilized earlier work by Amedeo Avogadro and André-Marie Ampère, were distributed. Cannizzaro's efforts exerted a heavy and, in some cases, an almost immediate influence on the delegates. Lothar Meyer later wrote that on reading Cannizzaro's paper,

I was astonished at its clarity, the little manuscript covered all the important points in dispute. It was as if scales fell from my eyes, doubts vanished, and a feeling of calm certainty came over me.

An important long-term result of the Karlsruhe Congress was the adoption of the now-familiar atomic weights. Prior to the Karlsruhe meeting, and going back to John Dalton's work in 1803, several systems of atomic weights were in use. In one case, a value of 1 was adopted as the weight of hydrogen (the base unit), with 6 for carbon and 8 for oxygen. As long as there were uncertainties over atomic weights then the compositions of many compounds remained in doubt. Following the Karlsruhe meeting, values of about 1 for hydrogen, 12 for carbon, 16 for oxygen, and so forth were adopted. This was based on a recognition that certain elements, such as hydrogen, nitrogen, and oxygen, were composed of diatomic molecules and not individual atoms.

== Attendance ==
The number of people who wanted to participate was considerable, and on 3 September 1860, 140 chemists met together in the meeting room of the second Chamber of State, which was made available by the Frederick I, Grand Duke of Baden.

According to Wurtz, the printed list of members, supplemented by handwritten additions, contains 126 names listed below.

| Country | City | Scientists |
|---|---|---|
| Austria | Innsbruck | Heinrich Hlasiwetz |
| Austria | Lemberg | Leopold von Pebal |
| Austria | Pesth | Theodor Wertheim |
| Austria | Vienna | Viktor von Lang |
| Austria | Vienna | Adolf Lieben |
| Austria | Vienna | Karl Folwarczny |
| Austria | Vienna | Franz Schneider |
| Belgium | Brussels | Jean Stas |
| Belgium | Ghent | François Donny Jr. |
| Belgium | Ghent | August Kekulé |
| France | Montpellier | Antoine Béchamp |
| France | Montpellier | Armand Gautier |
| France | Montpellier | C. G. Reischauer |
| France | Mulhouse | Th. Schneider |
| France | Nancy | Jérôme Nicklès |
| France | Paris | Jean Baptiste Boussingault |
| France | Paris | Jean-Baptiste Dumas |
| France | Paris | Charles Friedel |
| France | Paris | Louis Grandeau |
| France | Paris | Louis René Le Canu (1800–1871) |
| France | Paris | Jean-François Persoz |
| France | Paris | Alfred Riche (1829–1908) |
| France | Paris | Paul Thénard |
| France | Paris | Émile Verdet |
| France | Paris | Charles-Adolphe Wurtz |
| France | Strasbourg | Eugène Théodore Jacquemin (1828–1909) |
| France | Strasbourg | Charles Oppermann (1805–1872) |
| France | Strasbourg | Frédéric Charles Schlagdenhauffen (1830–1907) |
| France | Strasbourg | Paul Schützenberger |
| France | Tann | Charles Kestner |
| France | Tann | Auguste Scheurer-Kestner |
| Germany | Berlin | Adolf von Baeyer |
| Germany | Berlin | Georg Hermann Quincke |
| Germany | Bonn | Hans Heinrich Landolt |
| Germany | Breslau | Lothar Meyer |
| Germany | Kassel | Carl Gustav Guckelberger |
| Germany | Klausthal | Johann August Streng |
| Germany | Darmstadt | Emil Wilhelm Winckler |
| Germany | Erlangen | Eugen Freiherr von Gorup-Besanez |
| Germany | Freiburg i. B. | Lambert Heinrich von Babo |
| Germany | Freiburg i. B. | Woldemar Alexander Adolph von Schneider (1843–1914) |
| Germany | Giessen | Emil Boeckmann |
| Germany | Giessen | Hermann Franz Moritz Kopp |
| Germany | Giessen | Heinrich Will |
| Germany | Göttingen | Friedrich Konrad Beilstein |
| Germany | Halle a. S. | Wilhelm Heinrich Heintz |
| Germany | Hanover | Friedrich Heeren |
| Germany | Heidelberg | Becker |
| Germany | Heidelberg | O. Braun |
| Germany | Heidelberg | Robert Bunsen |
| Germany | Heidelberg | Georg Ludwig Carius |
| Germany | Heidelberg | Richard August Carl Emil Erlenmeyer |
| Germany | Heidelberg | Otto Mendius |
| Germany | Heidelberg | Jacob Heinrich Wilhelm Schiel (1813–1889) |
| Germany | Jena | Karl Gotthelf Lehmann |
| Germany | Jena | Hermann Ludwig |
| Germany | Karlsruhe | A. Klemm |
| Germany | Karlsruhe | R. Muller |
| Germany | Karlsruhe | Julius Neßler |
| Germany | Karlsruhe | Theodor Petersen |
| Germany | Karlsruhe | Karl Friedrich Heinrich Seubert (1815–1868) |
| Germany | Karlsruhe | Karl Weltzien |
| Germany | Leipzig | Otto Linné Erdmann |
| Germany | Leipzig | Christoph Heinrich Hirzel |
| Germany | Leipzig | Wilhelm Knop |
| Germany | Leipzig | Kuhn |
| Germany | Mannheim | Carl Gundelach |
| Germany | Mannheim | Heinrich G. F. Schröder |
| Germany | Marburg a. L. | Rudolf Schmitt |
| Germany | Marburg a. L. | Constantin Zwenger |
| Germany | Munich | Friedrich Geiger (1833–1889) |
| Germany | Nuremberg | Ernst von Bibra |
| Germany | Offenbach | Grimm |
| Germany | Rappenau | Finck |
| Germany | Schönberg | Gustav Reinhold Hoffmann (1831–1919) |
| Germany | Speyer | Franz Keller |
| Germany | Speyer | Albert Mühlhaüser |
| Germany | Stuttgart | Hermann von Fehling |
| Germany | Stuttgart | W. Hallwachs |
| Germany | Tübingen | Karl Finckh von Winterbach |
| Germany | Tübingen | Alexander Naumann |
| Germany | Tübingen | Adolph Strecker |
| Germany | Wiesbaden | Wilhelm Theodor Oscar Casselmann |
| Germany | Wiesbaden | Carl Remigius Fresenius |
| Germany | Wiesbaden | Carl Neubauer |
| Germany | Würzburg | Johann Joseph Scherer |
| Germany | Würzburg | Valentin Schwarzenbach (1830–1890) |
| Italy | Genoa | Stanislao Cannizzaro |
| Italy | Pavia | Angelo Pavesi |
| Mexico | | Louis Posselt (1817-1880 brother of Christian Posselt) |
| Portugal | Coimbra | Matias de Carvalho e Vasconcelos (1832–1910) |
| Russia | Kharkov | Alexei Nikolajewitsch Sawitsch |
| Russia | St. Petersburg | Alexander Borodin |
| Russia | St. Petersburg | Dmitri Mendeleev |
| Russia | St. Petersburg | Leon Nikolajewitsch Schischkow |
| Russia | St. Petersburg | Nikolay Zinin |
| Russia | Warsaw | Teofil Lesiński |
| Russia | Warsaw | Jakub Natanson |
| Sweden | Harpenden | Joseph Henry Gilbert |
| Sweden | Lund | Nils Johan Berlin |
| Sweden | Lund | Christian Wilhelm Blomstrand |
| Sweden | Stockholm | Johann Friedrich Bahr |
| Switzerland | Bern | Carl Emanuel Brunner |
| Switzerland | Bern | Hugo Schiff |
| Switzerland | Geneva | Jean Charles Galissard de Marignac |
| Switzerland | Lausanne | Henri Bischoff (1813–1889) |
| Switzerland | Reichenau bei Chur | Adolph von Planta |
| Switzerland | Zurich | Johannes Wislicenus |
| Spain | Madrid | Ramón Torres Muñoz de Luna |
| United Kingdom | Dublin | James Apjohn |
| United Kingdom | Edinburgh | Alexander Crum Brown |
| United Kingdom | Edinburgh | James Alfred Wanklyn |
| United Kingdom | Edinburgh | Frederick Guthrie |
| United Kingdom | Glasgow | Thomas Anderson |
| United Kingdom | London | Baldwin Francis Duppa (1828–1873) |
| United Kingdom | London | Carey Foster |
| United Kingdom | London | John Hall Gladstone |
| United Kingdom | London | Hugo Müller |
| United Kingdom | London | Henry Minchin Noad |
| United Kingdom | London | Alphonse René Le Mire de Normandy |
| United Kingdom | London | William Odling |
| United Kingdom | Manchester | Henry Enfield Roscoe |
| United Kingdom | Oxford | Charles Giles Bridle Daubeny |
| United Kingdom | Oxford | George Griffith |
| United Kingdom | Oxford | Friedrich Schickendantz |
| United Kingdom | Woolwich | Frederick Augustus Abel |
