= Triangulane =

[2]Triangulane, the simplest triangulane compound, consists of a chain of two spiro-linked cyclopropane rings

A triangulane is a hydrocarbon consisting exclusively of a series of spiro-linked cyclopropane rings.

Triangulanes are named according to the rules of systematic nomenclature for spiro compounds. The pattern of their common names is "[n]triangulane", where n is the number of cyclopropane units. The simplest such chemical, [2]triangulane, is named spiro[2.2]pentane by systematic nomenclature. Chains consisting of four or more cyclopropane units—[4]triangulane and higher—can form chiral helices. This property is unusual for a molecule that contains no stereogenic atoms; the chiral nature is due to restricted mobility of the chain ends analogous to helicene molecules.

The rings can form a branched or cyclic patterns. For example, [3]rotane is a branched [4]triangulane; it consists of one additional cyclopropane attached to the central ring of a [3]triangulane chain.

Triangulane derivatives have seen some use in medicine — e.g. lomedeucitinib contains a [2]triangulane ring system, while vanzacaftor contains a [3]triangulane ring system.
