= Rotane =

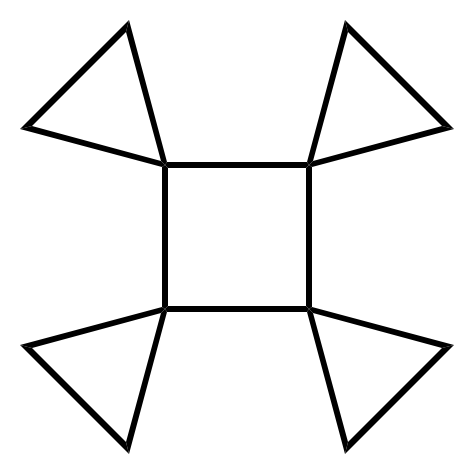
[4]Rotane consists of a cyclobutane core, with a spiro-cyclopropane on each corner of it

A rotane is a hydrocarbon consisting of a central cycloalkane ring with cyclopropane units spiro-linked to each corner. The systematic naming pattern for these molecules is "[n]rotane", where n is the number of atoms in the central ring.

The simplest such chemical, [3]rotane, consists solely of a branched array of spiro-cyclopropane units, and is thus a branched triangulane.
