= August Freund =

Austrian chemist

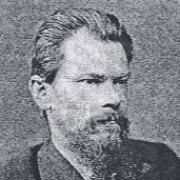
- Born: 30 July 1835; Kęty, Austrian Empire
- Died: 28 February 1892 (aged 56); Lemberg, Austria-Hungary
- Education: University of Lemberg, University of Leipzig
- Known for: Discovery of cyclopropane (trimethylene)
- Scientific career
- Fields: organic chemistry
- Workplaces: University of Lemberg
- Doctoral advisor: Leopold von Pebal

August Freund (30 July 1835 – 28 February 1892) was an Austrian chemist who in 1881 first synthesised cyclopropane.

== Life ==
Freund was born in 1835 in the town of Kęty, Austrian Empire (now in Poland). After graduating from the gymnasium (an advanced secondary school) in Cieszyn (then in Austria-Hungary, now on the Polish border with the Czech Republic), he studied pharmacy in Lemberg (now Lviv, Ukraine) and then in Leipzig, German Empire. After studying at the University of Lemberg from 1856 to 1858, he received a master's degree in pharmacy. He then assisted professor Leopold von Pebal in his investigations of petroleum. By 1861, he was teaching at a gymnasium in Ternopil (then in Austria-Hungary, now in Ukraine). By 1869, he was appointed a professor at the realschule (secondary school) in Lviv. He then began working towards a doctoral degree, receiving a doctorate from Leipzig University in 1871. In 1872, he became a professor of chemistry at the Lviv Technical University. There he investigated fermentation, petroleum, and ketones — among other subjects. He became dean of the Department of General and Analytical Chemistry, and from 1878, dean of the Department of Technical Chemistry. He was elected rector of the Polytechnic three times.

In 1881 he discovered a method for synthesising cyclopropane: he treated 1,3 - dibromopropane with sodium metal. The method now bears his name. He was able to synthesise enough cyclopropane to do several chemical reactions and derive from the results the three-membered ring structure of cyclopropane.

He died in Lemberg in 1892.

== Selected writings ==
- August Freund (1861) "Beiträge zur Kenntniss der phenylschwefligen und der Phenylschwefelsäure" (Contributions to our knowledge of phenylsulfurous and phenylsulfuric acids), Annalen der Chemie, 120 (1) : 76–89.
- August Freund (1861) "Ueber die Natur der Ketone" (On the nature of ketones), Journal für praktische Chemie, 82 (1) : 214-231.
- August Freund, Zarys chemii do użytku szkół gimnazyalnych [Outline of chemistry for use in gymnasiums] (Lviv, Austria-Hungary: I. Zwiazkowa, 1883) [in Polish].
