= Dimethanospiro(2.2)octaplane =

Dimethanospiro[2.2]octaplane
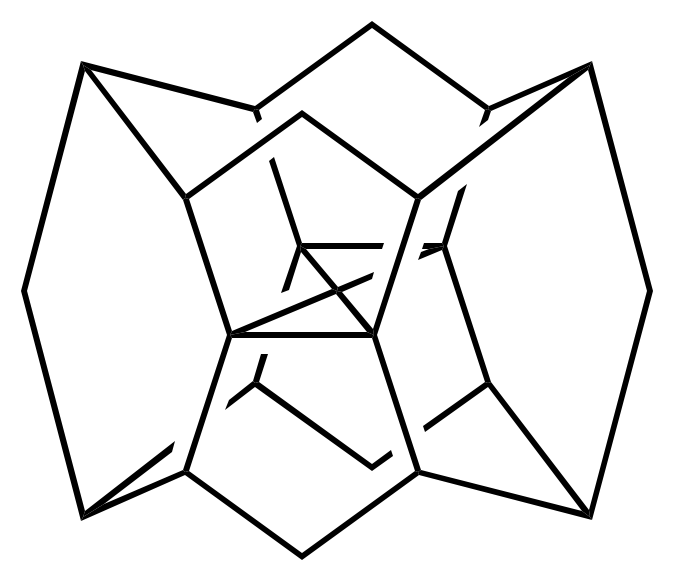

Names
- IUPAC name Dodecacyclo[11.10.0.0^{1,5}.0^{2,13}.0^{2,21}.0^{3,18}.0^{6,15}.0^{8,23}.0^{9,14}.0^{11,20}.0^{12,14}.0^{12,17}]tricosane

Identifiers
3D model (JSmol)	Interactive image
PubChem CID	100967056
CompTox Dashboard (EPA)	DTXSID601336872
- InChI: InChI=1S/C23H24/c1-7-11-3-15-9-2-10-17-5-13-8(1)14-6-18(10)22-16(9)4-12(7)20(14,22)23(22)19(11,13)21(15,17)23/h7-18H,1-6H2 Key: LMDPKFRIIOUORN-UHFFFAOYSA-N
- SMILES: C1C2C3CC4C5CC6C7C48C39C83C48C2CC5C34C6CC8C1C9C7

Properties
Chemical formula	C_{23}H_{24}
Molar mass	300.445 g·mol^{−1}
- Except where otherwise noted, data are given for materials in their standard state (at 25 °C [77 °F], 100 kPa). Infobox references

Dimethanospiro[2.2]octaplane is a hypothetical saturated hydrocarbon that is expected to have a carbon atom in with a stable, unusual square-planar coordination rather than the usual tetrahedral geometry of a carbon atom with four bonds.

== Molecular architecture ==
An octaplane contains a central carbon atom is surrounded by four carbon atoms, which are held in place by perpendicular links to two cyclooctane rings above and below. The parent structure octaplane itself is expected to have a very low ionization potential and a square–planar geometry as the monocation, however calculations on the neutral compound found that the central carbon would distort to a square–pyramidal geometry.

In dimethanospiro[2.2]octaplane, two pairs of the carbons attached to the central one are bonded to each other to make a spiropentane, and there are two methylene linkages between the two cyclooctane rings.
