= Chamigrene =

(−)-β-Chamigrene

Names
- IUPAC name (R)-11-Methylene-3,7,7-trimethylspiro[5.5]undec-2-ene

Identifiers
CAS Number	18431-82-8
3D model (JSmol)	Interactive image
ChEBI	CHEBI:10359
ChemSpider	390805
KEGG	C09637
PubChem CID	442353
CompTox Dashboard (EPA)	DTXSID60939822
- InChI: InChI=1S/C15H24/c1-12-7-10-15(11-8-12)13(2)6-5-9-14(15,3)4/h7H,2,5-6,8-11H2,1,3-4H3/t15-/m1/s1 Key: WLNGPDPILFYWKF-OAHLLOKOSA-N
- SMILES: CC1(C)[C@@]2(C(=C)CCC1)CCC(C)=CC2

Properties
Chemical formula	C_{15}H_{24}
Molar mass	204.357 g·mol^{−1}
- Except where otherwise noted, data are given for materials in their standard state (at 25 °C [77 °F], 100 kPa). Infobox references

(−)-β-Chamigrene is the parent compound of subclass of sesquiterpenes found in various marine and terrestrial plants. The stereoisomer (−)-β-chamigrene is the most common in nature.

Chamigrenes (chamigrene-related compounds) are characterized by a spiro[5.5]undecane core with an all-carbon quaternary stereocenter at the junction of the spirocycle.
