= C3H6 =

The molecular formula C_{3}H_{6} (molar mass: 42.08 g/mol, exact mass: 42.0470 u) may refer to:

- Cyclopropane
- Propylene, also known as propene
