= Spiroheptane =

Hydrocarbon molecule

One enantiomer of a dicarboxylic acid derivative of spiroheptane (Fecht's acid).

Spiroheptane refers to spirocyclic hydrocarbons with the formula C(CH_{2})_{6}. The parent symmetrical member of this group of compounds is spiro[3.3]heptane, which features a pair of cyclobutane rings sharing one carbon. The parent unsymmetrical member is spiro[2.4]heptane, which features cyclopropyl and cyclopentyl rings sharing one carbon.

An early example of a spiro[3.3]heptane is the dicarboxylic acid C[(CH_{2})_{2}CH(CO_{2}H)]_{2}, also called Fecht's acid in honor of H. Fecht, of the Strasbourg Institute of Chemistry, the person who obtained this compound. His route involved alkylation of malonic esters with the tetrabromide of pentaerythritol, a method modeled after the work on spiropentane.
