= Carl Gustav Guckelberger =

German chemist (1820–1902)

- Born: 1820; Stuttgart, Kingdom of Württemberg
- Died: 9 August 1902 (aged 81–82) near Kassel, Germany
- Education: University of Gießen
- Scientific career
- Doctoral advisor: Justus von Liebig

Carl Gustav Guckelberger (1820 – 9 August 1902) was a German chemist.

== Life ==
Guckelsberger worked in a pharmacy in Stuttgart, but started studying chemistry with Hermann von Fehling, also in Stuttgart, for two semesters. With the recommendation of Fehling, Guckelsberger joined the laboratory of Justus von Liebig at the University of Gießen, where he received his Ph.D. His research there concerned the oxidation of albumin and related compounds.

In the 1850s he started working at a paper factory near Großalmerode, which he became technical director of. Later he directed a soda factory; some sources credit him with significant improvements to the manufacture of soda, while others dispute the claim, giving more of the credit to his assistant Ludwig Mond.

Guckelberger retired in 1867 and lived near Kassel the rest of his life.

== Additional sources ==
- Wankmüller, Armin (1966), "Apotheker Carl Gustav Guckelberger", Beiträge zur Wurttembergischen Apothekengeschichte (in German), 7: 82–85, archived from the original on 2014-08-26
