= Activation of cyclopropanes by transition metals =

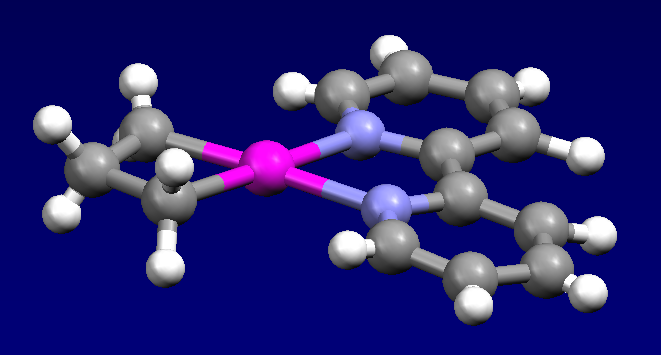
Structure of the platinacyclobutane PtC_{3}H_{6}(bipy) derived from activation of cyclopropane.

In organometallic chemistry, the activation of cyclopropanes by transition metals is a research theme with implications for organic synthesis and homogeneous catalysis. Being highly strained, cyclopropanes are prone to oxidative addition to transition metal complexes. The resulting metallacycles are susceptible to a variety of reactions. These reactions are rare examples of C-C bond activation. The rarity of C-C activation processes has been attributed to Steric effects that protect C-C bonds. Furthermore, the directionality of C-C bonds as compared to C-H bonds makes orbital interaction with transition metals less favorable. Thermodynamically, C-C bond activation is more favored than C-H bond activation as the strength of a typical C-C bond is around 90 kcal per mole while the strength of a typical unactivated C-H bond is around 104 kcal per mole.

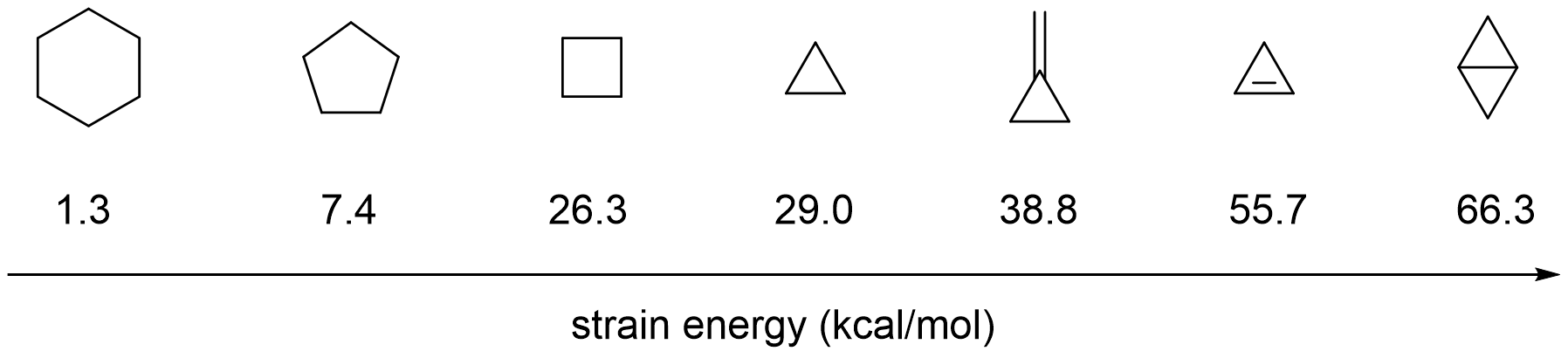

Two main approaches achieve C-C bond activation using a transition metal. One strategy is to increase the ring strain and the other is to stabilize the resulting cleaved C-C bond complex (e.g. through aromatization or chelation). Because of the large ring strain energy of cyclopropanes (29.0 kcal per mole), they are often used as substrates for C-C activation through oxidative addition of a transition metal into one of the three C-C bonds leading to a metallacyclobutane intermediate.

Substituents on the cyclopropane affect the course of its activation.

== Reaction scope ==
=== Cyclopropane ===
The first example of cyclopropane being activated by a metal complex was reported in 1955, involving the reaction of cyclopropane and hexachloroplatinic acid. This reaction produces the polymeric platinacyclobutane complex Pt(C_{3}H_{6})Cl_{2}. The bis(pyridine) adduct of this complex was characterized by X-ray crystallography.

The electrophile Cp*Ir(PMe_{3})(Me)OTf reacts with cyclopropane to give the allyl complex:

Cp*Ir(PMe_{3})(Me)OTf + C_{3}H_{6} → [Cp*Ir(PMe_{3})(η^{3}-C_{3}H_{5})]OTf + CH_{4}

Oxidative addition into cyclopropane C-C bond gives a metallacyclobutane.

=== Fused and spiro-cyclopropanes ===
Rhodium-catalyzed C-C bondactivation of strained spiropentanes leads to a cyclopentenones. In terms of mechanism, the reaction proceeds by apparent oxidative addition of the 4-5 carbon-carbon bond, leading to a rhodacyclobutane intermediate. In the presence of carbon monoxide, migratory insertion of CO into one of the carbon-rhodium bonds gives a rhodacyclopentanone intermediate. Beta-carbon elimination to form an alkene from the other carbon-rhodium bond leads to a rhodacyclohexanone intermediate with an exocyclic double bond. Reductive elimination of the two carbon-rhodium bonds followed by isomerization of the exocyclic double bond leads to the desired beta-substituted cyclopentenone product. This reaction was applied to the total synthesis of (±)-β-cuparenone.

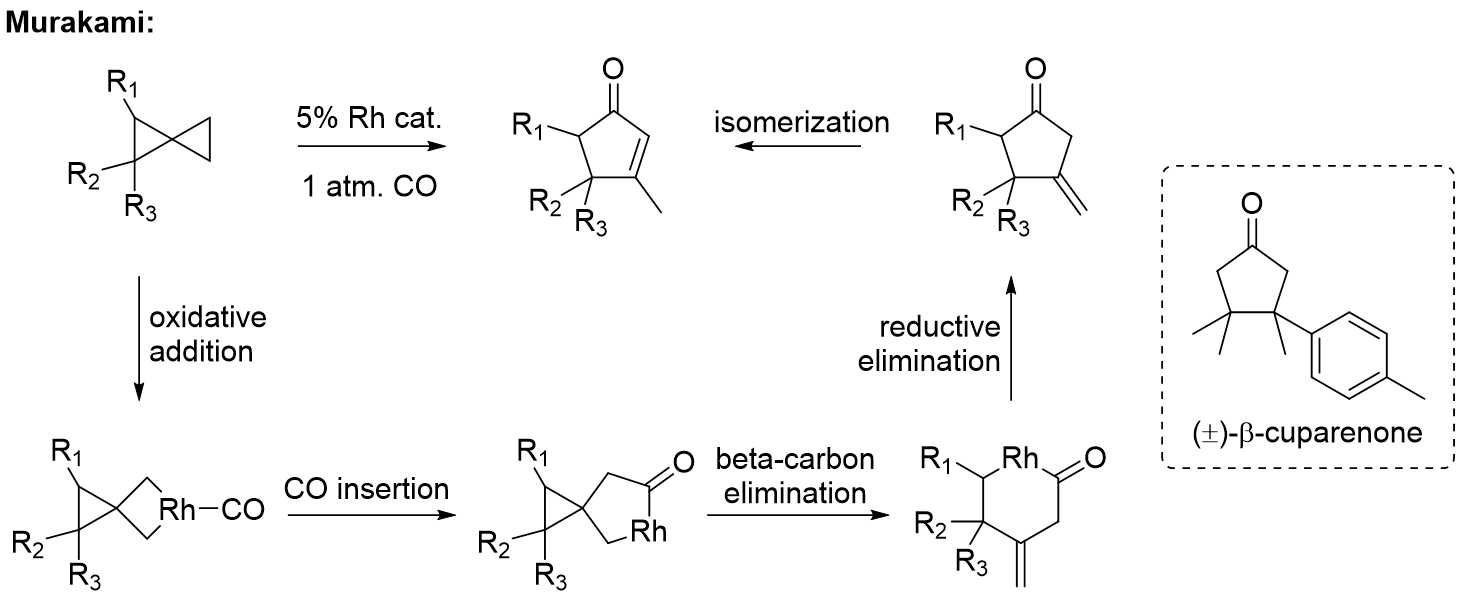

Using the same rhodium(I) catalyst and C-C bond activation strategy one can access compounds with fused rings. Once again the reaction involves oxidative addition to give a rhodacyclobutane eventually affording a rhodacycloheptene intermediate. Insertion of carbon monoxide into one of the carbon-rhodium bonds form a rhodacyclooctenone intermediate that can reductively eliminate to yield a 6,7-fused ring system. The authors propose that the regioselectivity of the initial oxidative addition is controlled by coordination of the endocyclic double bond to the rhodium catalyst.

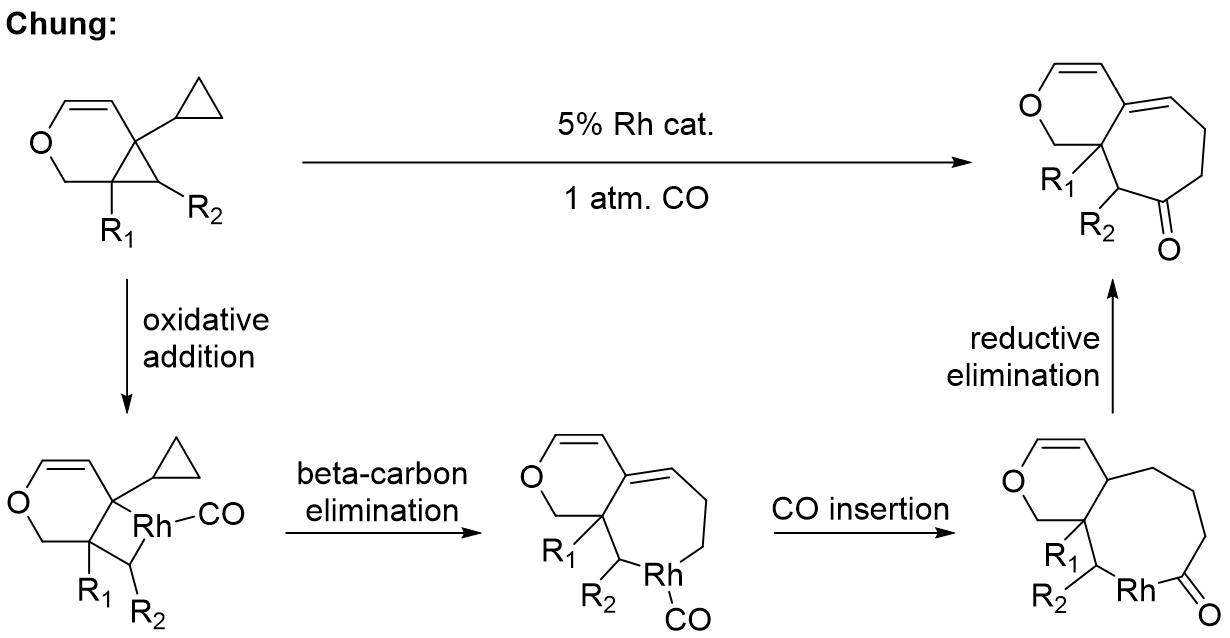

=== Cyclopropyl halides ===
Nickel(0) complexes oxidatively cleave halocyclopropanes to give allyl)Ni(II) halides.

=== Cyclopropylketones ===
With cyclopropylketones, transition metal can coordinate to the ketone to direct oxidative addition into the proximal C-C bond. The resulting metallacyclobutane intermediate can be in equilibrium with the six-membered alkyl metal enolate depending on presence of a Lewis acid (e.g. dimethylaluminum chloride).

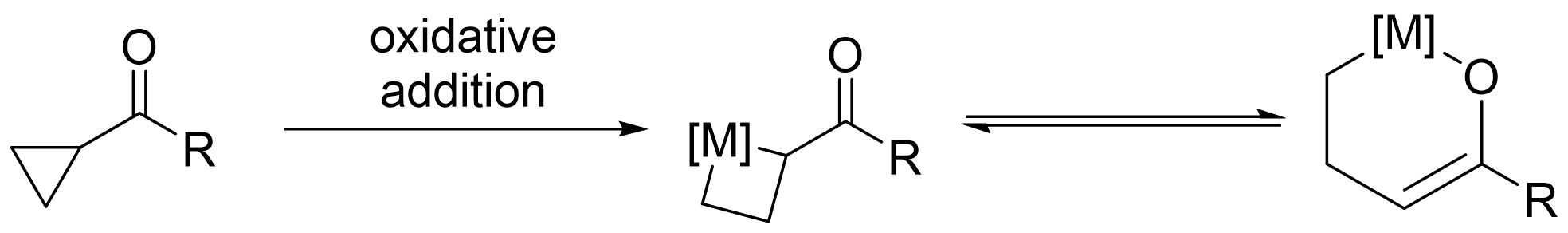

With the metallacyclobutane intermediate, 1,2-migratory insertion into an alkyne followed by reductive elimination yields a substituted cyclopentene product. Examples of intramolecular reactions with a tethered alkyne and intermolecular reactions with a nontethered alkyne both exist with use of a nickel or rhodium catalyst. With the six-membered alkyl metal enolate intermediate, dimerization or reaction with an added alpha-beta unsaturated ketone yields a 1,3-substituted cyclopentane product.

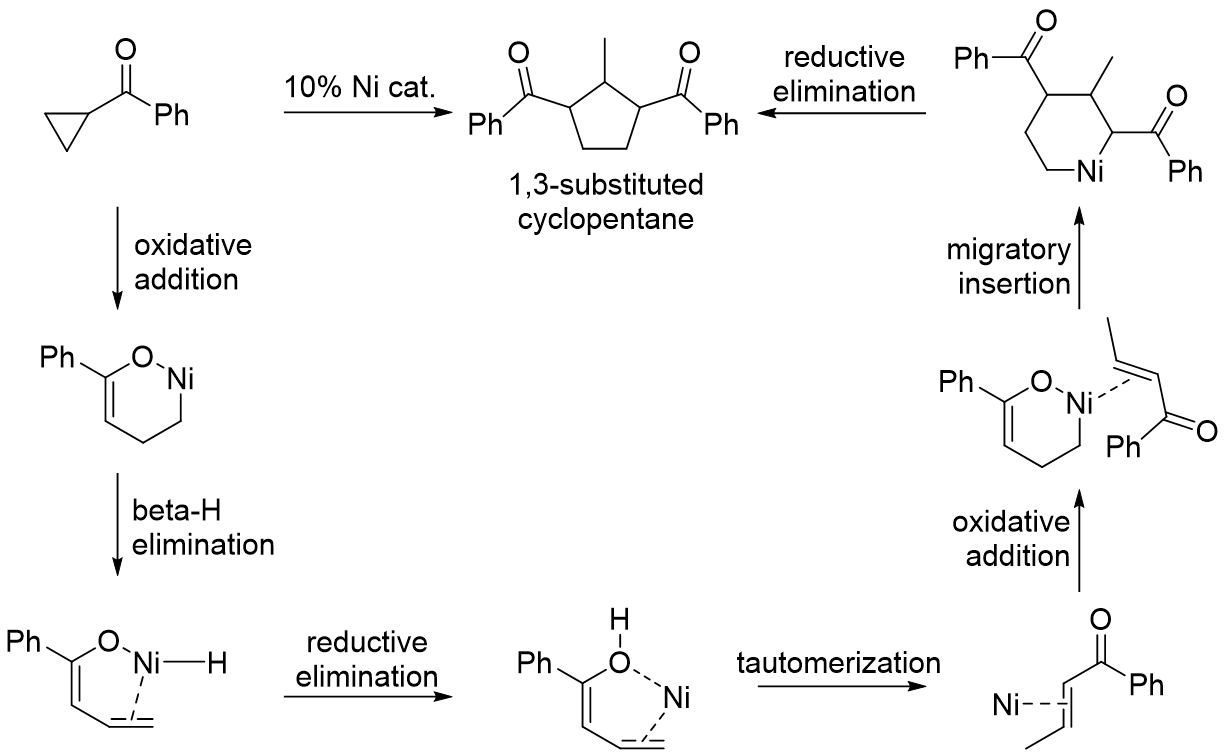

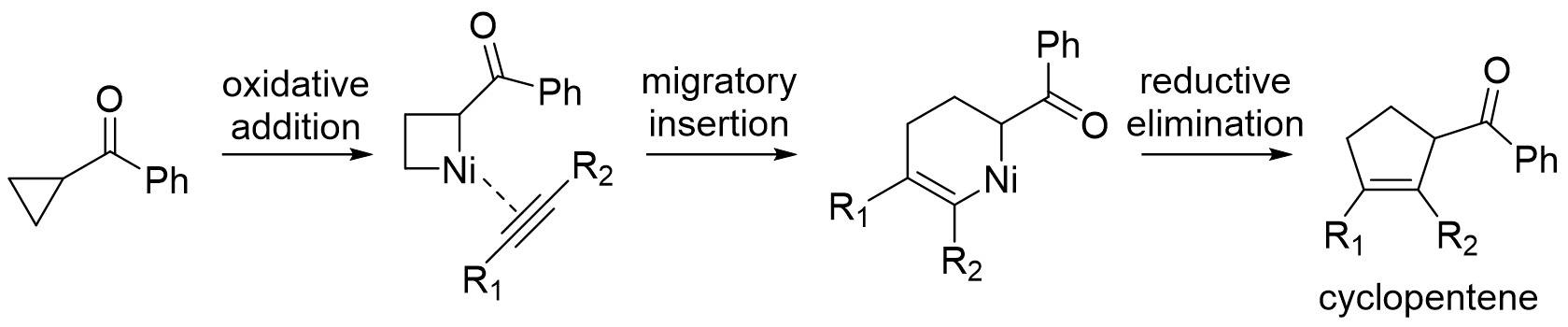

=== Cyclopropylimines ===
Oxidative addition into cyclopropylimines gives a metalloenamine intermediate similar to oxidative addition to cyclopropylketones giving alkylmetalloenolates. These intermediates can also reaction with alpha-beta unsaturated ketones to give disubstituted cyclopentane products following reductive elimination.

With rhodium, the intermediate metalloenamine reacts with tethered alkynes. and alkenes to give cyclized products such as pyrroles and cyclohexenones, respectively.

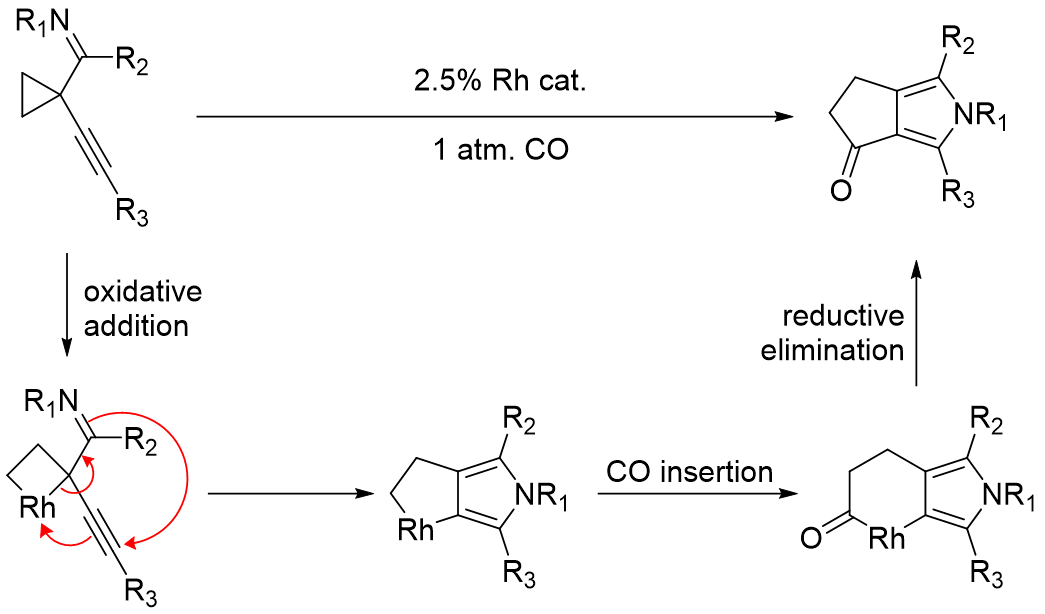

=== Alylidenecyclopropanes ===
Alkylidenecyclopropanes more readily undergo C-C bond oxidative addition than cyclopropanes.

Following oxidative addition, 1,2-insertion mechanisms are common and reductive elimination yields the desired product. The 1,2-insertion step usually occurs with an alkyne, alkene, or allene and the final product is often a 5 or 7 membered ring. Six-membered rings may be formed after dimerization of the metallocyclobutane intermediate with another alkylidenecyclopropane substrate and subsequent reductive elimination. Common transition metals utilized with alkylidenecyclopropanes are nickel, rhodium, and palladium. It has been shown that the metallacyclobutane intermediate following oxidative addition to the distal C-C bond can isomerize.

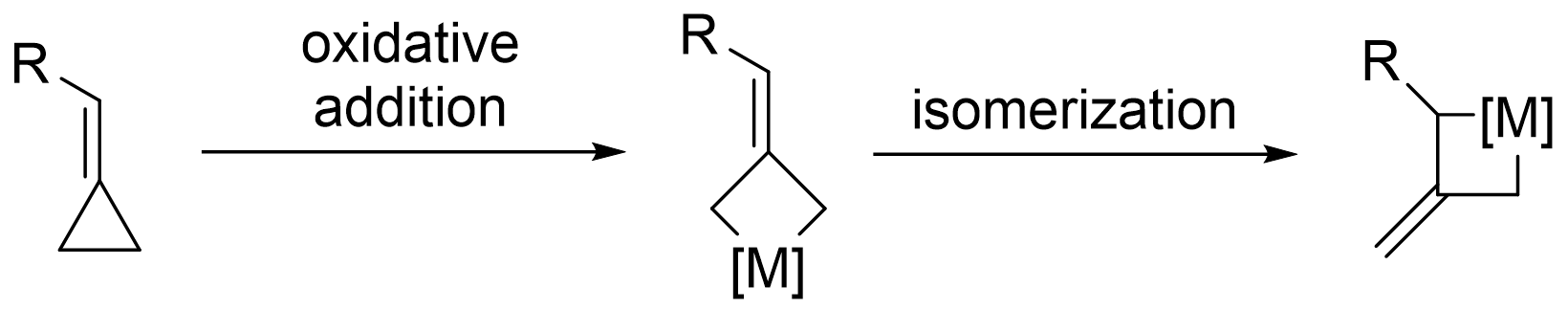

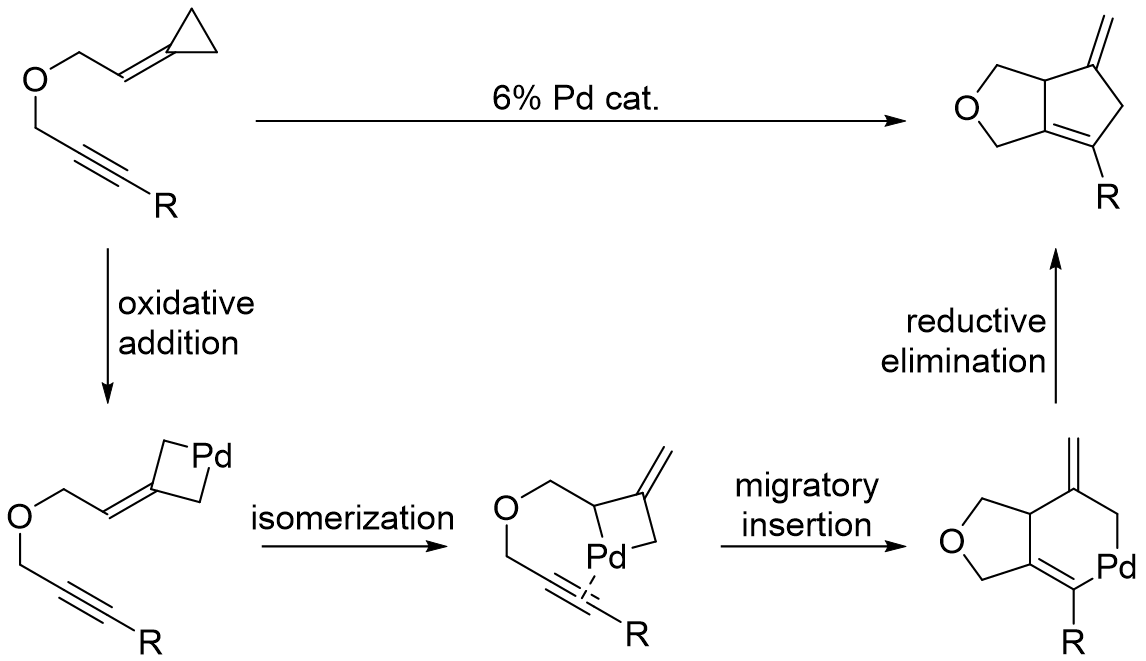

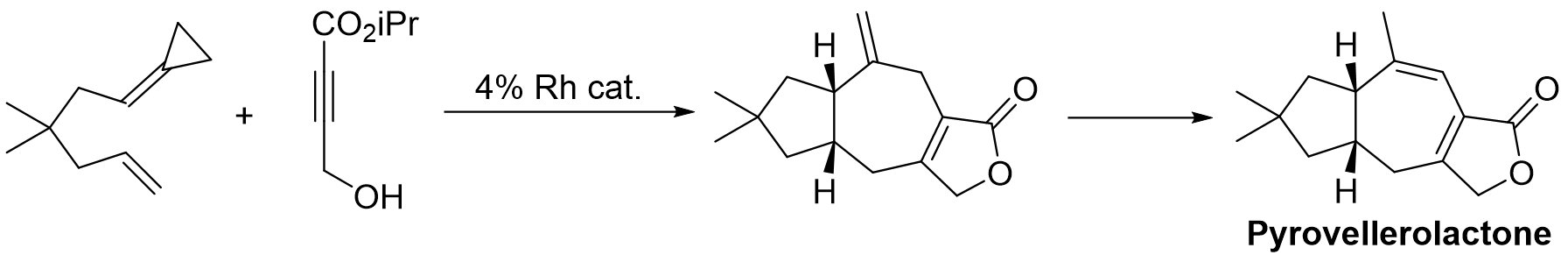

=== Vinylcyclopropanes ===
Oxidative addition of vinylcyclopropanes primarily occurs at the proximal position, giving pi-allyl intermediates. Through subsequent insertion reactions (e.g. with alkynes, alkenes, and carbon monoxide), rings of various sizes and fused ring systems can be formed.

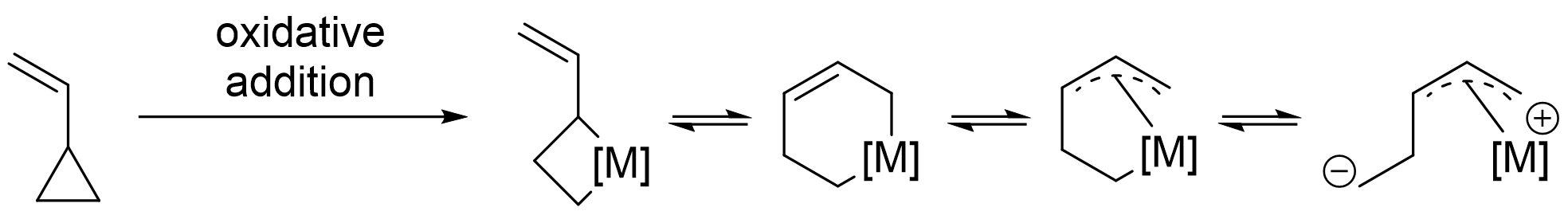

=== Cyclopropenes ===
Oxidative addition into cyclopropenes normally occurs at the less hindered position to yield the metallacyclobutane. This reaction can result in formation of cyclopentadienones, cyclohexenones, and phenols.

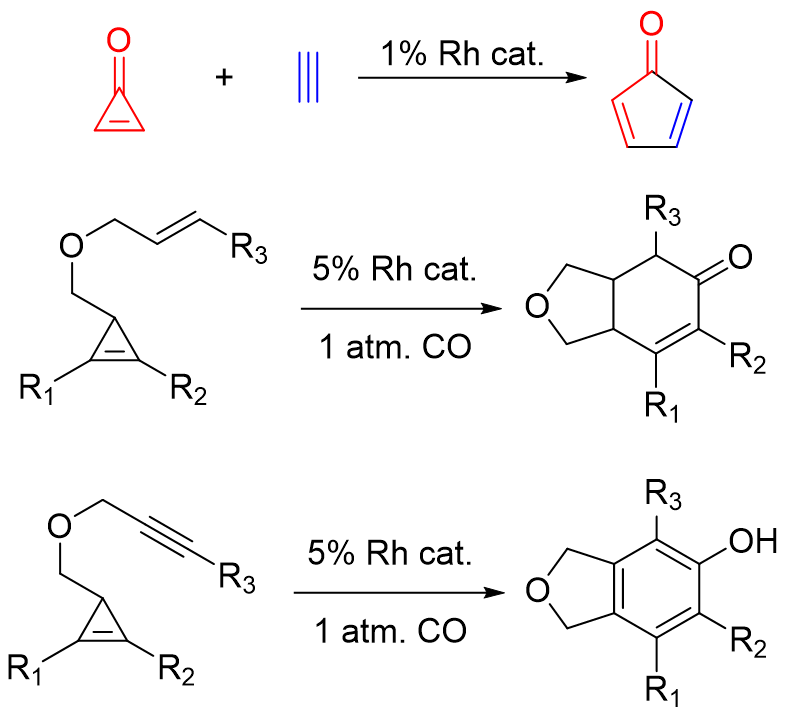
