= Ferric sodium EDTA =

Names
- Other names: Sodium ferric ethylenediaminetetraacetate; Ethylenediaminetetraacetic acid iron(III) sodium salt

Identifiers
CAS Number	15708-41-5
3D model (JSmol)	Interactive image
ChemSpider	25555
ECHA InfoCard	100.036.169
EC Number	239-802-2
PubChem CID	87063917
UNII	403J23EMFA
CompTox Dashboard (EPA)	DTXSID5027774
- InChI: InChI=1S/C10H16N2O8.Fe.Na/c13-7(14)3-11(4-8(15)16)1-2-12(5-9(17)18)6-10(19)20;;/h1-6H2,(H,13,14)(H,15,16)(H,17,18)(H,19,20);; Key: LKZLBQPNDYMRJE-UHFFFAOYSA-N
- SMILES: C(CN(CC(=O)[O-])CC(=O)[O-])N(CC(=O)[O-])CC(=O)[O-].[Na+].[Fe+3]

Properties
Chemical formula	C_{10}H_{12}FeN_{2}NaO_{8}
Molar mass	367.047 g·mol^{−1}
- Except where otherwise noted, data are given for materials in their standard state (at 25 °C [77 °F], 100 kPa). Infobox references

Ferric sodium EDTA, also known as sodium ferric ethylenediaminetetraacetate, is a broad spectrum molluscicide used to kill snails and slugs and protect agricultural crops and garden plants, and in particular to eliminate infestations of Cornu aspersum, the common garden snail.

Chemically, it is a salt of ethylenediaminetetraacetic acid (EDTA).

== Mechanism of action and environmental impacts ==
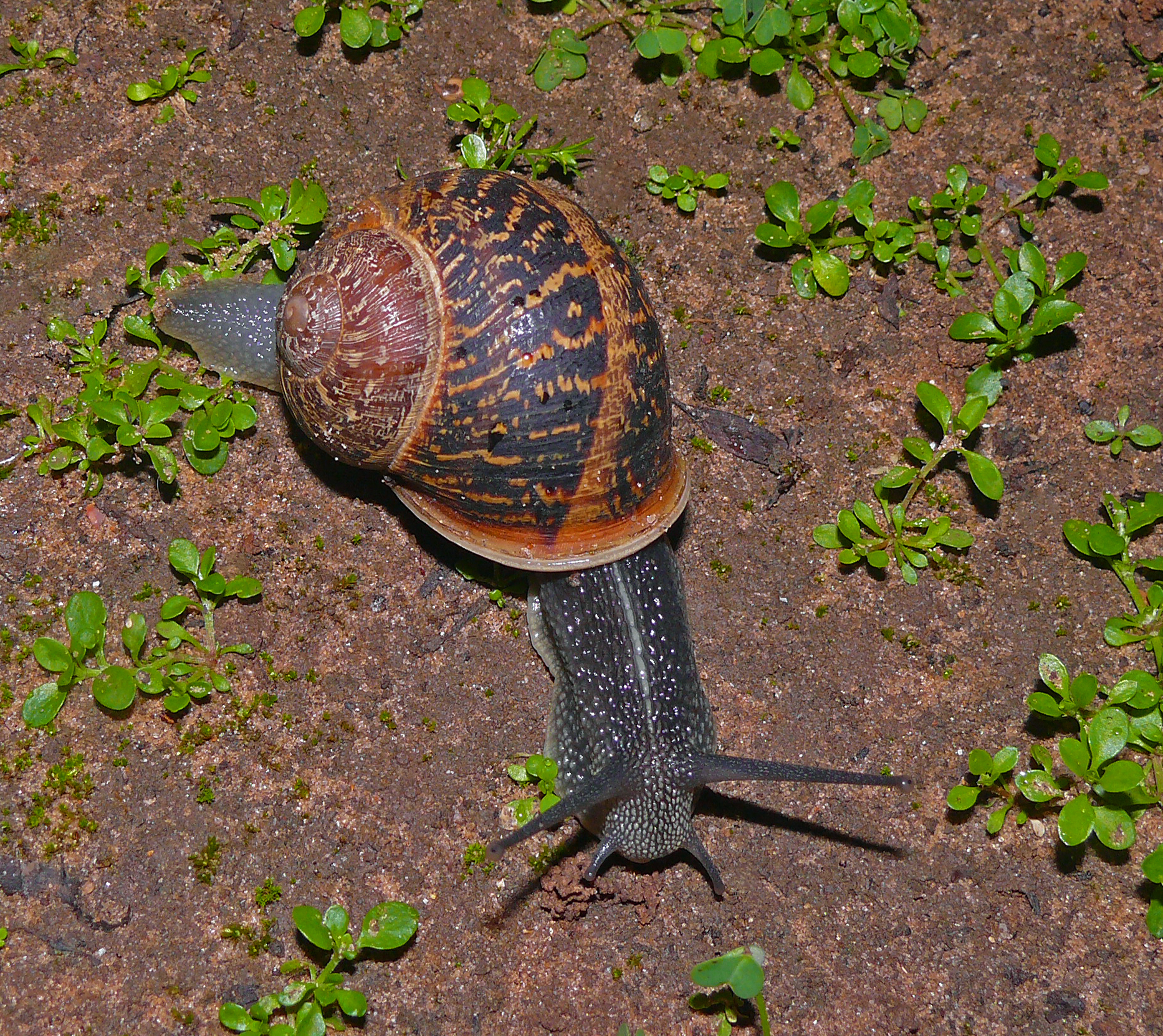
Cornu aspersum in warm regions commonly emerges in moist weather in winter.

Ferric sodium EDTA works by interacting with and destroying hemocyanin, a copper based compound found in the blood of molluscs and arthropods which is used to carry oxygen, similar to hemoglobin found in vertebrates, and typically kills snails and slugs in a matter of days following exposure. The compound is much safer than metaldehyde and does not pose a significant risk to birds, pets, or humans so long as the bait is not consumed. Snails and slugs which feed on or ingest ferric sodium EDTA stop feeding almost immediately after exposure, and die within two to three days. Ferric sodium EDTA is highly toxic to aquatic arthropods and care should be taken in applying it.

== Toxicity to dogs ==
Reports of dogs eating large amounts of ferric sodium EDTA have resulted in abdominal pain and haemorrhagic gastroenteritis, however, in all reported cases the dogs recovered after being treated.

== Impact to non-targeted animals ==
Ferric Sodium EDTA is considered a narrow target pesticide. It will target possibly beneficial predatory snails, but its mechanism of action is not considered to target other possibly beneficial insects.
