= Spiropentane =

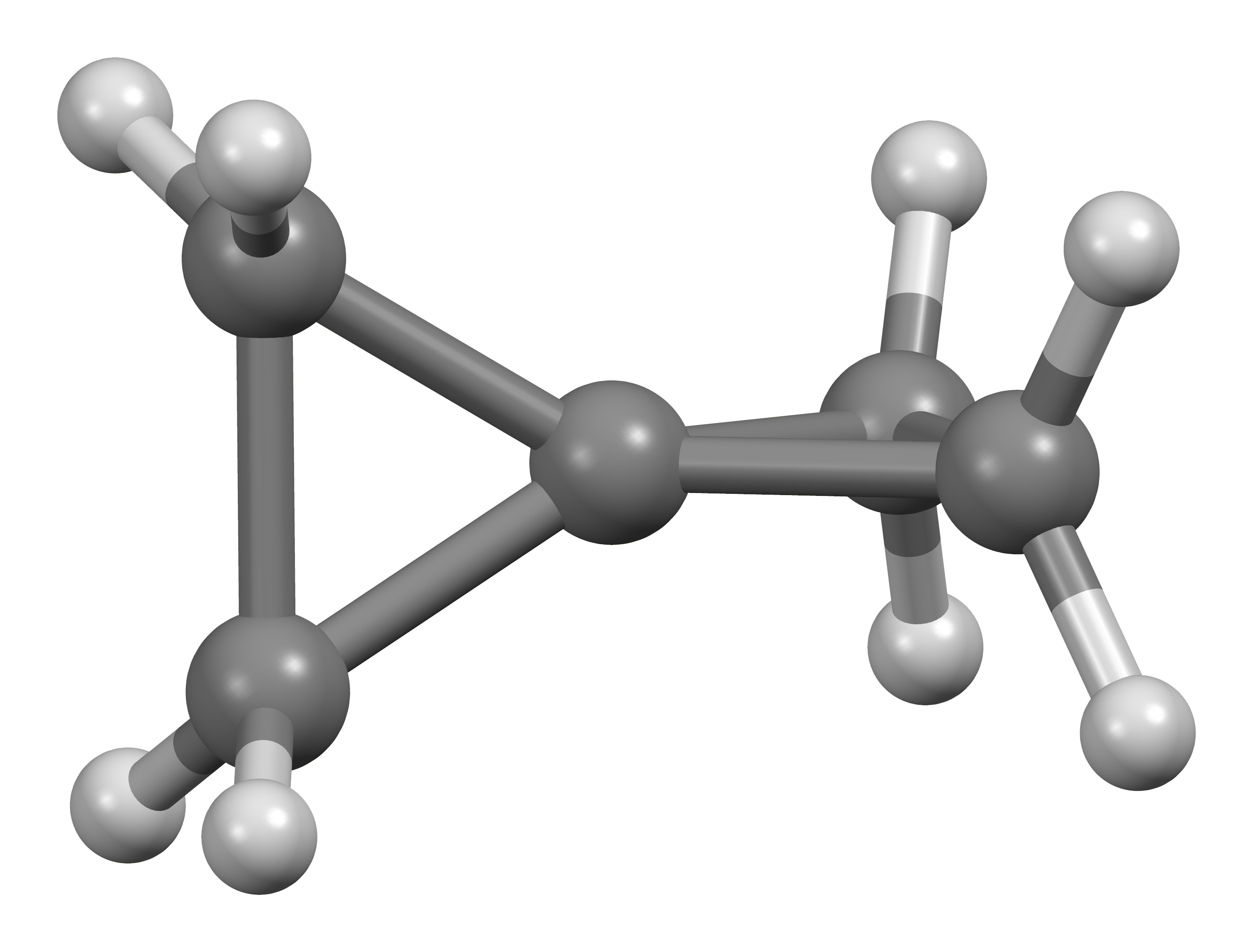

Names
- Preferred IUPAC name Spiro[2.2]pentane

Identifiers
CAS Number	157-40-4
3D model (JSmol)	Interactive image
ChemSpider	8734
PubChem CID	9088
CompTox Dashboard (EPA)	DTXSID10166181
- InChI: InChI=1S/C5H8/c1-2-5(1)3-4-5/h1-4H2 Key: OGNAOIGAPPSUMG-UHFFFAOYSA-N
- SMILES: C1CC12CC2

Properties
Chemical formula	C_{5}H_{8}
Molar mass	68.119 g·mol^{−1}
Melting point	−134.6 °C (−210.3 °F; 138.6 K)
Boiling point	39.0 °C (102.2 °F; 312.1 K)
- Except where otherwise noted, data are given for materials in their standard state (at 25 °C [77 °F], 100 kPa). Infobox references

Spiropentane is a hydrocarbon with formula C_{5}H_{8}. It is the simplest spiro-connected cycloalkane, a triangulane. It took several years after the discovery in 1887 until the structure of the molecule was determined. According to the nomenclature rules for spiro compounds, the systematic name is spiro[2.2]pentane. However, there can be no constitutive isomeric spiropentanes, hence the name is unique without brackets and numbers.

== Synthesis ==
After Gustavson produced cyclopropane by reacting 1,3-dibromopropane with ground-up zinc metal, he tried the same reaction with 2,2-bis(bromomethyl)-1,3-dibromopropane (see formula scheme). The starting material is easily obtained by reacting pentaerythritol with hydrobromic acid. A molecule with the formula C_{5}H_{8} was obtained. It was called vinyltrimethylene in the initial publication. In 1907, Fecht expressed the assumption that it must be spiropentane, a constitutional isomer of vinylcyclopropane. Further evidence for the structure of the hydrocarbon comes from the fact that it could also be obtained from 1,1-bis(bromomethyl)-cyclopropane (see formula scheme).

Spiropentane is difficult to separate from the other reaction products and the early procedures resulted in impure mixtures. Decades later, the production method was improved. The spiro hydrocarbon can be separated from the byproducts (2-methyl-1-butene, 1,1-dimethylcyclopropane, methylenecyclobutane) by distillation.

== Properties ==
=== Physical properties ===
Structural determination by electron diffraction showed two different C-C lengths; the bonds to the quaternary ("spiro") carbon atom are shorter (146.9 pm) than those between the methylene groups (CH_{2}–CH_{2}, 151.9 pm). The C–C–C angles on the spiro C atom are 62.2°, larger than in cyclopropane.

=== Chemical properties ===
When heating molecules of spiropentane labelled with deuterium atoms, a topomerization or "stereomutation" reaction is observed, similar to that of cyclopropane: cis-1,2-dideuteriospiropentane equilibrates with trans-1,2-dideuteriospiropentane.

Gustavson (1896) reported that heating spiropentane to 200 °C caused it to change into other hydrocarbons. A thermolysis in the gas phase from 360 to 410 °C resulted in ring expansion to the constitutional isomer methylenecyclobutane, along with the fragmentation products ethene and propadiene. Presumably, the longer – and weaker – bond is broken first, forming a diradical intermediate.

== Related compounds ==
- Spiroheptane
- Drugs that contain spiropentane ring systems:
  - Vanzacaftor
  - Lomedeucitinib
