= Paraldehyde =

Names
- IUPAC name 2,4,6-Trimethyl-1,3,5-trioxane
- Systematic IUPAC name 2,4,6-Trimethyl-1,3,5-trioxane

Identifiers
CAS Number	123-63-7
3D model (JSmol)	Interactive image
ChEBI	CHEBI:27909
ChEMBL	ChEMBL1410743
ChemSpider	21106173
ECHA InfoCard	100.004.219
EC Number	204-639-8
KEGG	D00705
MeSH	Paraldehyde
PubChem CID	31264
UNII	S6M3YBG8QA
CompTox Dashboard (EPA)	DTXSID9023419
- InChI: InChI=1S/C6H12O3/c1-4-7-5(2)9-6(3)8-4/h4-6H,1-3H3 Key: SQYNKIJPMDEDEG-UHFFFAOYSA-N; InChI=1/C6H12O3/c1-4-7-5(2)9-6(3)8-4/h4-6H,1-3H3 Key: SQYNKIJPMDEDEG-UHFFFAOYAO
- SMILES: CC1OC(C)OC(C)O1

Properties
Chemical formula	C_{6}H_{12}O_{3}
Molar mass	132.159 g·mol^{−1}
Appearance	Colourless liquid
Odor	Sweet
Density	0.996 g/cm^{3}
Melting point	12 °C (54 °F; 285 K)
Boiling point	124 °C (255 °F; 397 K)
Solubility in water	soluble 10% vv at 25 Deg.
Vapor pressure	13 hPa at 20 °C
Magnetic susceptibility (χ)	−86.2·10^{−6} cm^{3}/mol

Pharmacology
ATC code	N05CC05 (WHO)

Hazards
- Occupational safety and health (OHS/OSH)
Main hazards	Flammable
- GHS labelling
Pictograms	(GHS02: Flammable)
Signal word	Warning
Hazard statements	H226
Precautionary statements	P210, P233, P303+P361+P353, P370+P378, P403+P235, P501
Flash point	24°C - closed cup
Explosive limits	Upper limit: 17 %(V); Lower limit: 1.3 %(V)
- Lethal dose or concentration (LD, LC)
LD_{50} (median dose)	Oral - Rat - 1,530 mg/kg Dermal - Rabbit - 14,015 mg/kg
- Safety data sheet (SDS)
- Except where otherwise noted, data are given for materials in their standard state (at 25 °C [77 °F], 100 kPa). verify (what is ?) Infobox references

Paraldehyde is the cyclic trimer of acetaldehyde molecules. Formally, it is a derivative of 1,3,5-trioxane, with a methyl group substituted for a hydrogen atom at each carbon. The corresponding tetramer is metaldehyde. A colourless liquid, it is sparingly soluble in water and highly soluble in ethanol. Paraldehyde slowly oxidizes in air, turning brown and producing an odour of acetic acid. It attacks most plastics and rubbers and should be kept in glass bottles.

Paraldehyde was first observed in 1835 by the German chemist Justus Liebig; its empirical formula was determined in 1838 by Liebig's student Hermann Fehling. The German chemist Valentin Hermann Weidenbusch (1821–1893), another of Liebig's students, synthesized paraldehyde in 1848 by treating acetaldehyde with acid (either sulfuric or nitric acid) and cooling to 0°C. He found it quite remarkable that when paraldehyde was heated with a trace of the same acid, the reaction went the other way, recreating acetaldehyde.

Paraldehyde has uses in industry and medicine.

== Preparation ==
Paraldehyde can be produced by the direct reaction of acetaldehyde and sulfuric acid. The product of the reaction is dependent on the temperature. At room temperature and higher, the formation of trimer is preferred, but at lower temperatures, around −10 °C, the tetramer metaldehyde is more likely to be produced.

The reaction of sulfuric acid and acetaldehyde is exothermic, with the heat of reaction being −113 kJ·mol^{−1}.

== Stereochemistry ==
Paraldehyde is produced and used as a mixture of two diastereomers, known as cis- and trans-paraldehyde. For each diastereomer, two chair conformers are possible. The structures (1), (4) and (2), (3) are conformers of cis- and trans-paraldehyde, respectively. The structures (3) (a conformer of (2)) and (4) (a conformer of (1)) are high energy conformers on steric grounds (1,3-diaxial interactions are present) and do not exist to any appreciable extent in a sample of paraldehyde.

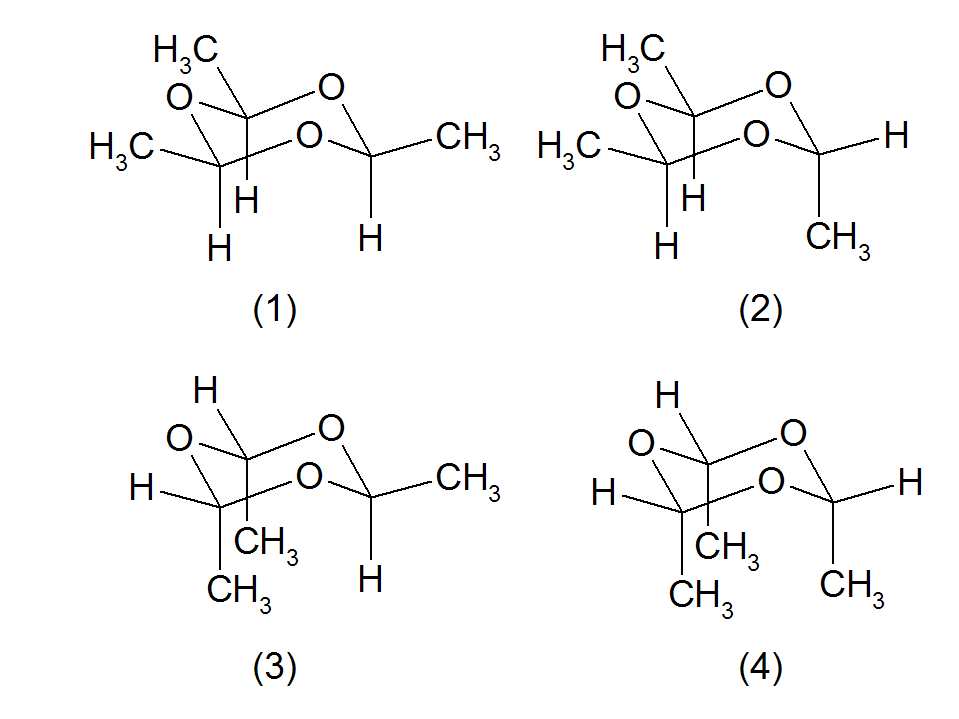

== Reactions ==
Heated with catalytic amounts of acid, it depolymerizes back to acetaldehyde:

C_{6}H_{12}O_{3} → 3CH_{3}CHO

Since paraldehyde has better handling characteristics, it may be used indirectly or directly as a synthetic equivalent of anhydrous acetaldehyde (b.p. 20 °C). For example, it is used as-is in the synthesis of bromal (tribromoacetaldehyde):

C_{6}H_{12}O_{3} + 9 Br_{2} → 3 CBr_{3}CHO + 9 HBr

== Medical applications ==
Paraldehyde was introduced into clinical practice in the UK by the Italian physician Vincenzo Cervello (1854–1918) in 1882.

It is a central nervous system depressant and was soon found to be an effective anticonvulsant, hypnotic and sedative. It was included in some cough medicines as an expectorant (though there is no known mechanism for this function beyond the placebo effect).

Paraldehyde was the last injection given to Edith Alice Morrell in 1950 by the alleged serial killer John Bodkin Adams. He was tried for her murder but acquitted.

=== As a hypnotic/sedative ===
It was commonly used to induce sleep in sufferers from delirium tremens but has been replaced by other drugs in this regard. It was considered to have been one of the safest hypnotics and was regularly given at bedtime in psychiatric hospitals and geriatric wards until the 1970s, but after it was confirmed that acetaldehyde is a confirmed category-1 human carcinogen, it could no longer be considered appropriately safe to use. Up to 30% of the dose is excreted via the lungs (the rest via the liver). This contributes to a strong unpleasant odour on the breath.

=== As anti-seizure drug ===
Today, paraldehyde is sometimes used to treat status epilepticus. Unlike diazepam and other benzodiazepines, it does not suppress breathing at therapeutic doses and so is safer when no resuscitation facilities exist or when the patient's breathing is already compromised. This makes it a useful emergency medication for parents and other caretakers of children with epilepsy. Since the dose margin between the anticonvulsant and hypnotic effect is small, paraldehyde treatment usually results in sleep.

=== Administration ===
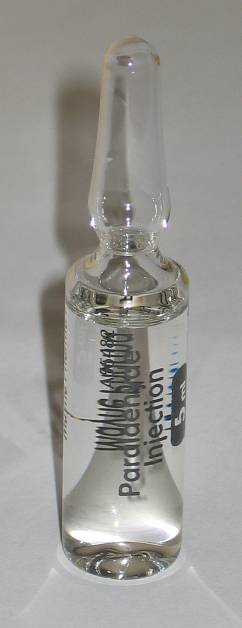
A 5 mL glass ampoule of paraldehyde.

Generic paraldehyde is available in 5 mL sealed glass ampoules. Production in the US has been discontinued, but it was previously marketed as Paral.

Paraldehyde has been given orally, rectally, intravenously and by intramuscular injection. It reacts with rubber and plastic which limits the time it may safely be kept in contact with some syringes or tubing before administration.

- Injection. Intramuscular injection can be very painful and lead to sterile abscesses, nerve damage, and tissue necrosis. Intravenous administration can lead to pulmonary edema, circulatory collapse and other complications.
- Oral. Paraldehyde has a hot burning taste and can upset the stomach. It is often mixed with milk or fruit juice in a glass cup and stirred with a metal spoon.
- Rectal. It may be mixed 1 part paraldehyde with 9 parts saline or, alternatively, with an equal mixture of peanut or olive oil.

== Industrial applications ==
Paraldehyde is used in resin manufacture as an alternative to formaldehyde when making phenol formaldehyde resins. It has also found use as antimicrobial preservative, and rarely as a solvent. It has been used in the generation of aldehyde fuchsin.
