= Molluscicide =

Pesticide used to kill molluscs

Molluscicides (/məˈlʌskɪˌsaɪds, -ˈlʌs-/) are chemicals that kill molluscs. They are also known as snail baits, snail pellets, or slug pellets. These pesticides against molluscs are usually used in agriculture or gardening, in order to control gastropod pests—specifically slugs and snails which damage crops or other valued plants by feeding on them. They are also used to limit the spread of Schistosoma mansoni, a human parasite that causes schistosomiasis, by preventing it from reproducing asexually within snails.

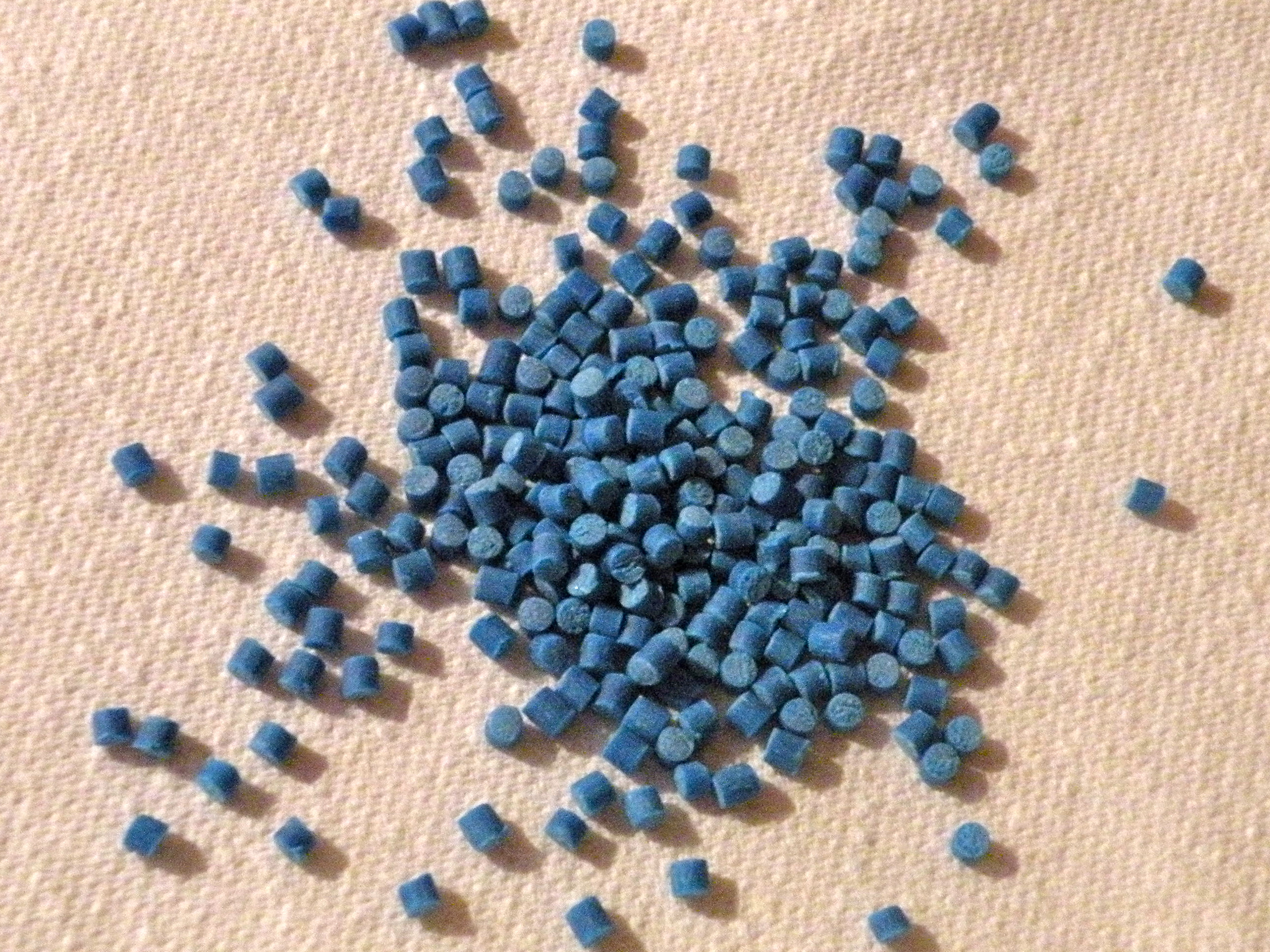
Metaldehyde pellets

A number of chemicals can be employed as a molluscicide:

- Quicklime slaked lime, and kainite, respectively CaO, Ca(OH)_{2}, and KCl/MgSO_{4}·3H_{2}O kill by dehydration. Hundreds of kilograms per hectare are required.
- Metal salts such as iron(III) phosphate, aluminium sulfate, and ferric sodium EDTA, relatively non-toxic, most are approved for use in organic gardening
- Metaldehyde
- Niclosamide
- Acetylcholinesterase inhibitors (e.g. methiocarb), highly toxic to other animals and humans with a quick onset of toxic symptoms.

Many chemicals have been developed as molluscicides.

Slug pellets contain a carbohydrate source (e.g. durum flour) as a bulking agent.

== See also ==
- Pesticide poisoning
- Pest control
- Biological pest control
