= Spiropentadiene =

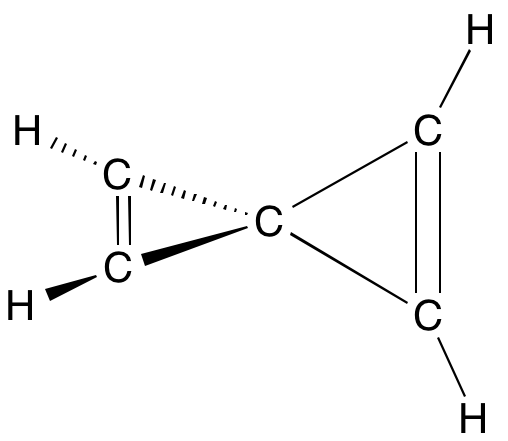

Names
- Preferred IUPAC name Spiro[2.2]penta-1,4-diene
- Other names Bowtiediene; Spiropenta-1,4-diene

Identifiers
CAS Number	1727-65-7
3D model (JSmol)	Interactive image
ChemSpider	35807558
PubChem CID	14901520
UNII	US9R6MF2C7
CompTox Dashboard (EPA)	DTXSID80565167
- InChI: InChI=1S/C5H4/c1-2-5(1)3-4-5/h1-4H Key: JXGJFWLYGSVFBS-UHFFFAOYSA-N
- SMILES: C1=CC21C=C2

Properties
Chemical formula	C_{5}H_{4}
Molar mass	64.087 g·mol^{−1}
- Except where otherwise noted, data are given for materials in their standard state (at 25 °C [77 °F], 100 kPa). verify (what is ?) Infobox references

Spiropentadiene, or bowtiediene, is a hydrocarbon with formula C_{5}H_{4}. The simplest spiro-connected diene, it is very unstable—decomposing even below −100 °C—due to its high bond strain and does not occur in nature. Its synthesis was reported in 1991.

== Synthesis ==
Spiropentadiene was synthesised from bistrimethylsilylpropynone 1 by reaction with p-toluenesulfonylhydrazide to tosylhydrazone 2 followed by treatment with sodium cyanoborohydride to allene 3 and followed by two successive reactions with chlorocarbene generated from methyllithium and dichloromethane to spiro compound 5. Spiropentadiene was trapped in a liquid nitrogen trap after reaction with TBAF in a double elimination reaction.

== Derivatives ==
The derivative dichlorospiropentadiene has been reported. An all-silicon derivative (Si_{5} frame, (^{t}BuMe_{2}Si)_{3}Si side groups) is also known. In contrast to the carbon parent this compound is stable with a melting point of 216 to 218 °C. The angle between the two rings as measured by X-ray single-crystal analysis is 78°.
