= Von Babo's law =

Von Babo's law (sometimes styled Babo's law) is an experimentally determined scientific law formulated by German chemist Lambert Heinrich von Babo in 1857. It states that the vapor pressure of solution decreases according to the concentration of solute. The law is related to other laws concerning the vapor pressure of solutions, such as Henry's law and Raoult's law.

== See also ==
- Henry's Law
- Raoults Law
