= Karl Weltzien =

German chemist (1813–1870)

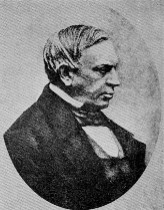
- Born: Karl A. Weltzien; February 8, 1813; Saint Petersburg, Russian Empire
- Died: November 14, 1870 (aged 57); Karlsruhe, Kingdom of Prussia
- Scientific career
- Fields: Chemistry
- Institutions: Karlsruhe Institute of Technology

Karl Weltzien (sometimes Carl Weltzien; 8 February 1813 in Saint Petersburg – 14 November 1870 in Karlsruhe) was a German scientist who was Professor of Chemistry at the Technische Hochschule of Karlsruhe from 1848 to 1869. Starting about 1840, Weltzien constructed new laboratories for chemistry research and teaching at Karlsruhe. Weltzien's successor as Professor of Chemistry was Lothar Meyer.

Weltzien is perhaps best known today as one of three organizers of the Karlsruhe Congress of 1860, an early international meeting of chemists, the other organizers being Wurtz and Kekulé. Weltzien acted as the local organizer, opened the meeting with a brief welcoming speech, and chaired the first session.
