= Hermann von Fehling =

German chemist (1812–1885)

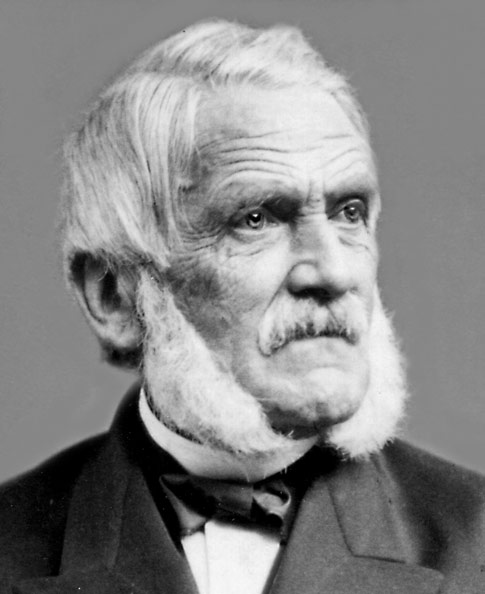
- Born: Hermann Christian von Fehling; June 9, 1812; Lubeck, Bouches-de-l'Elbe, First French Empire
- Died: July 1, 1885 (aged 73); Stuttgart, Kingdom of Württemberg, German Empire
- Occupation: Chemist
- Known for: Fehling's solution
- Spouse: Sophie Cleß
- Father: Wilhelm Fehling

Hermann von Fehling (9 June 1812 – 1 July 1885) was a German chemist, famous as the developer of Fehling's solution used for estimation of sugar.

== Biography ==
Hermann von Fehling was born in Lübeck. With the intention of taking up pharmacy he entered Heidelberg University about 1835. After graduating he went to Gießen as preparateur to Justus von Liebig, with whom he elucidated the composition of paraldehyde and metaldehyde. In 1839, on Liebig's recommendation, he was appointed to the chair of chemistry in the polytechnic in Stuttgart, a position he held for over 45 years. He died in Stuttgart in 1885.

His earlier work included an investigation of succinic acid, and the preparation of phenyl cyanide (better known as benzonitrile), the simplest nitrile of the aromatic series. Later his time was mainly occupied with questions of technology and public health rather than with pure chemistry.

Among the analytical methods he worked up the best known is that for the estimation of sugars. Known as Fehling's solution it is a solution of copper sulfate mixed with alkali and potassium sodium tartrate (Rochelle salt). He was a contributor to the Handwörterbuch of Liebig, Friedrich Wöhler and Johann Christian Poggendorff, and to the Graham-Otto Textbook of Chemistry. For many years was a member of the committee of revision of the Pharmacopoeia Germanica.
