= Lambert Heinrich von Babo =

German chemist (1818–1899)

- Born: 26 November 1818; Ladenburg, Grand Duchy of Baden
- Died: 15 April 1899 (aged 80); Karlsruhe, Grand Duchy of Baden

Lambert Heinrich Joseph Anton Konrad Freiherr von Babo (25 November 1818 – 15 April 1899) was a German chemist.

== Life and career ==
Babo was the son of the agronomist Lambert Joseph von Babo and his first wife Karoline Ehrmann. The oenologist August Wilhelm von Babo was his half-brother. After graduating from high school Babo studied medicine at the Universities of Heidelberg and Munich and received a doctorate in 1842 from Heidelberg. In the following year he began studying chemistry under Justus von Liebig at Gießen receiving his habilitation in 1845 from Freiburg im Breisgau.

On 6 September 1847 he married Elise Baumgärtner in Freiburg and had a daughter and two sons.

He became a Privatdozent at the University of Freiburg außerordentlicher Professor in 1854 and ordentlicher Professor in 1859. As such, he was also appointed an expert for the Grand Ducal courts.

Babo determined vapor pressure of water, called von Babo's law. He also developed the Babo funnel for heating glass flasks, named after him. This consists of an inverted cone stump made from sheet steel with asbestos strips arranged radially on the inside wall.

== Bibliography ==
- Arsen in Vergiftungsfälle (1844)
- Zentrifugalkraft (1852)
