= Metaldehyde =

Names
- IUPAC name 2,4,6,8-tetramethyl-1,3,5,7-tetroxocane
- Other names metaldehyde metacetaldehyde ethanal tetramer

Identifiers
CAS Number	108-62-3
3D model (JSmol)	Interactive image; Interactive image
ChEBI	CHEBI:81931
ChEMBL	ChEMBL2251334
ChemSpider	54981
ECHA InfoCard	100.003.274
EC Number	203-600-2
KEGG	C18744
PubChem CID	61021
UNII	4CI033VJYG
UN number	1332
CompTox Dashboard (EPA)	DTXSID1034715
- InChI: InChI=1S/C8H16O4/c1-5-9-6(2)11-8(4)12-7(3)10-5/h5-8H,1-4H3 Key: GKKDCARASOJPNG-UHFFFAOYSA-N; InChI=1/C8H16O4/c1-5-9-6(2)11-8(4)12-7(3)10-5/h5-8H,1-4H3 Key: GKKDCARASOJPNG-UHFFFAOYAG
- SMILES: CC1OC(C)OC(C)OC(C)O1; O1C(OC(OC(OC1C)C)C)C

Properties
Chemical formula	C_{8}H_{16}O_{4}
Molar mass	176.212 g/mol
Density	1.27 g/cm^{3}
Melting point	246 °C (475 °F; 519 K)
Boiling point	sublimes at 110 to 120 °C (230 to 248 °F; 383 to 393 K)

Hazards
- GHS labelling
Pictograms	(GHS02: Flammable) (GHS06: Toxic) (GHS08: Health hazard)
Signal word	Danger
Hazard statements	H228, H301, H361f, H412
Precautionary statements	P203, P210, P240, P241, P264, P270, P273, P280, P301+P316, P318, P321, P330, P370+P378, P405, P501
- Except where otherwise noted, data are given for materials in their standard state (at 25 °C [77 °F], 100 kPa). verify (what is ?) Infobox references

Metaldehyde is an organic compound with the formula (C_{8}H_{16}O_{4}). It is used as a pesticide against slugs and snails. It is the cyclic tetramer of acetaldehyde.

== Production and properties ==
Metaldehyde is flammable, toxic if ingested in large quantities, and irritating to the skin and eyes. It has a white crystalline appearance with a menthol odor.

Metaldehyde is obtained in moderate yields by treatment of acetaldehyde with chilled mineral acids. The liquid trimer, paraldehyde is also obtained. The reaction is reversible; upon heating to about 80 °C, metaldehyde and paraldehyde revert to acetaldehyde.

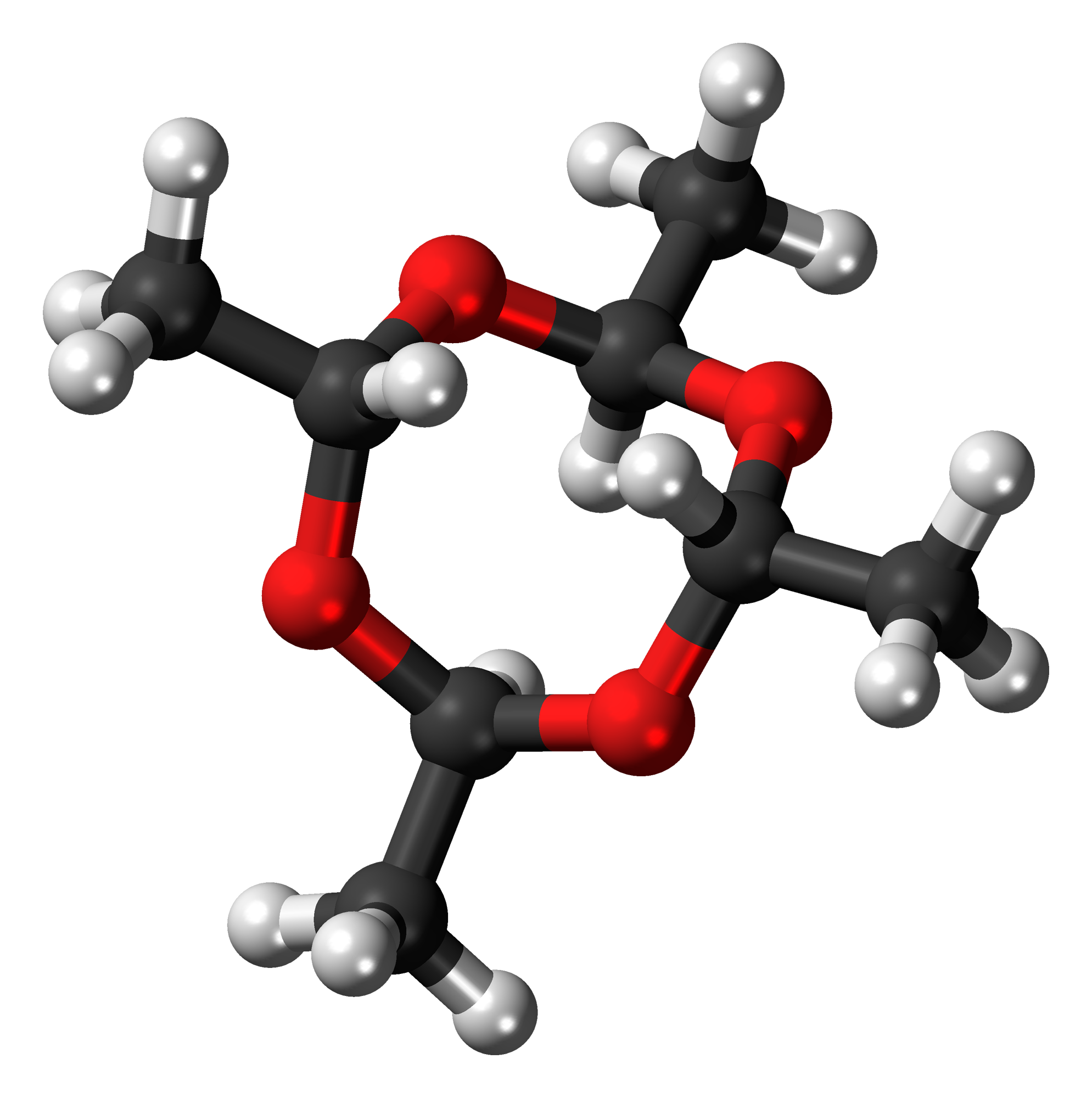
The D_{2d} stereomer

Metaldehyde exists as a mixture of four stereoisomers, molecules that differ with respect to the relative orientation of the methyl groups on the 8-membered ring. The stereoisomers have respectively the molecular symmetries C_{s} (with symmetry of order 2), C_{2v} (order 4), D_{2d} (order 8), and C_{4v} (order 8). All have at least one plane of reflexion, so none of them is chiral.

== Uses ==
=== As a pesticide ===
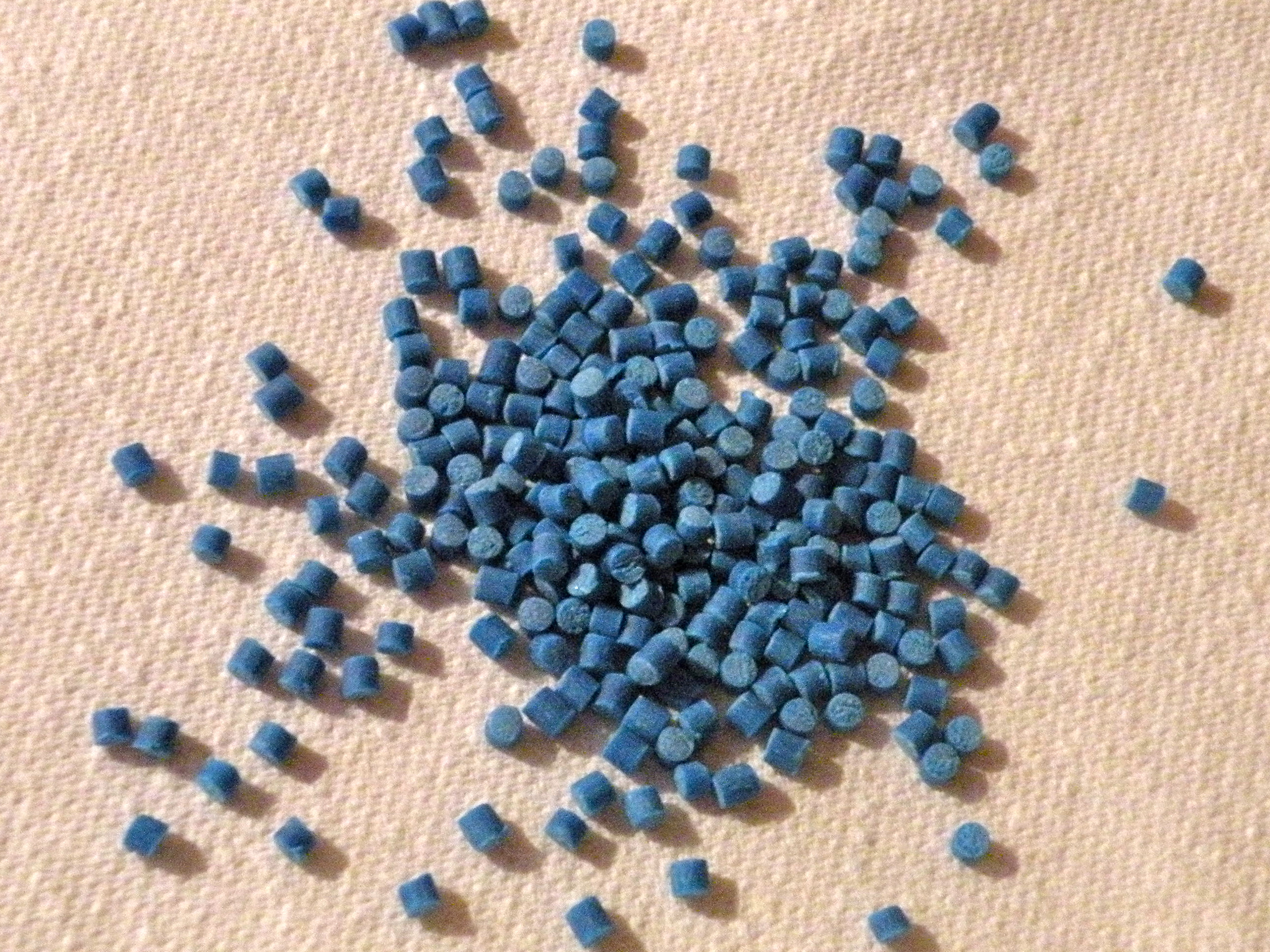
Granules of metaldehyde (trade name Limacide)

It is sold under various trade names as a molluscicide, including Antimilice, Ariotox, Blitzem (in Australia), Cekumeta, Deadline, Defender (in Australia), Halizan, Limacide, Limatox, Limeol, Meta, Metason, Mifaslug, Namekil, Slug Fest, and Slugit. Typically it is applied in pellet form, but it is also found as a liquid spray, granules, paste, or dust. Often the pesticide includes bran or molasses to attract pests, making it attractive to household pets as well.

Metaldehyde is effective on pests by contact or ingestion and works by limiting the production of mucus in mollusks making them susceptible to dehydration.

Metaldehyde products were used to control the invasive African land snail population in Miami-Dade County in Florida. Experimental use permits from the U.S. Environmental Protect Agency authorized the application amount and usage in residential areas.

Due to the contamination of drinking water by metaldehyde's use in agriculture, a specialist organisation was established in 2008 called "The Metaldehyde Stewardship Group (MSG)".

On 19 December 2018, the British government banned the use of metaldehyde slug pellets outdoors from spring 2020; after this date it would only be legal to use it in permanent greenhouses. In July 2019, the ban was overturned after the High Court in London agreed with a challenge to its legality. Metaldehyde pellets returned to the UK market until 18 September 2020, when the British government banned the use of metaldehyde slug pellets outdoors after 31 March 2022.

=== Other uses ===
Metaldehyde was originally developed as a solid fuel. It is still used as a camping fuel, also for military purposes, or solid fuel in lamps. It may be purchased in a tablet form to be used in small stoves, and for preheating of Primus type stoves. It is sold under the trade name of "META" by Lonza Group of Switzerland; it can be included in the field ration of some nations.

== Safety and toxicity to pets and humans ==
Metaldehyde has a toxicity profile identical to that for acetaldehyde, being mildly toxic and a respiratory irritant at the 50 ppm level. In terms of water safety, during periods of rainfall metaldehyde pellets become agitated and can seep into natural water courses. The European Commission restricts metaldehyde levels to 0.1 μg/L in drinking water.

Metaldehyde-containing slug baits are banned in some countries as they are toxic to dogs and cats and disturb the natural ecosystems. There is no antidote or specific treatment plan for metaldehyde poisoning. Symptoms of poisoning in dogs and cats vary and are very similar to poisonings by other substances, however they can include tremors, drooling, hyperthermia, vomiting, and restlessness. If left untreated, symptoms will proceed to seizures and death within days. Severity of symptoms and speed of onset depend on the quantity ingested and the other contents of the stomach which affect absorption.

A diagnosis can be made by an analysis of stomach contents, which tend to have an apple cider vinegar odor, as well as a history of exposure to the chemical. Treatment includes IV fluids, sedation, lowering body temperature, and purging of stomach contents with charcoal. Prompt and aggressive medical attention after a poisoning may make a full recovery possible within 2–3 days.

Due to this toxicity, pet owners may want to investigate alternatives which are not as toxic to pets, such as ferric sodium EDTA or aluminium sulfate. The metaldehyde tablets resemble candies and do not taste bad, making accidental ingestion possible by children or even by adults unaware of their true nature. Their use was popular during the interwar period and several cases of poisoning resulted. Baits may contain a bitterant to prevent accidental consumption by pets or children.

Oral ingestions of metaldehyde have been described in adults attempting suicide; amongst them, the majority experienced gastrointestinal or neurological symptoms. When compared to humans with accidental ingestion of metaldehyde, those attempting suicide tend to be symptomatic (for example reduced concentrations of GABA causing seizures) and often require care in an intensive care unit and/or long-term hospitalization.

== See also ==
- Methiocarb
- Paraldehyde
