= Alexander Naumann =

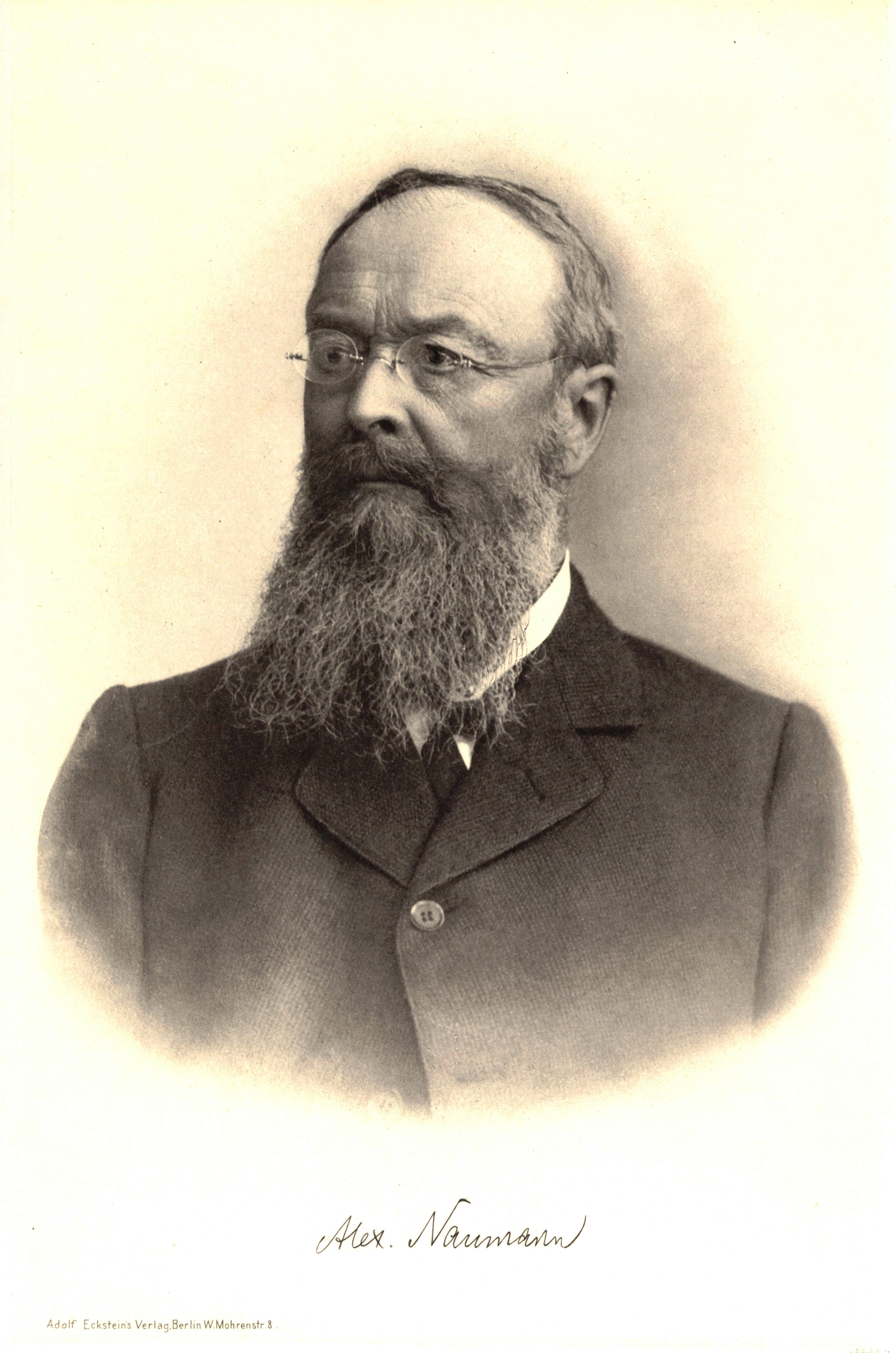

Alexander Nikolaus Franz Naumann (31 July 1837 – 16 March 1922) was a Prussian and German physical chemist and a professor at the University of Giessen. He was a pioneer of chemical thermodynamics and proposed that molecules reacted when their energy levels exceeded a certain critical level which could be achieved through the provision of heat.

Naumann was born in Eudorf near Alsfeld where his father, Carl Naumann (1805-1886), was a Protestant minister. He was educated at the Gymnasium in Darmstadt before he went to the University of Giessen where he received a doctorate in 1859. His doctoral work was on the bromination of acetyl chloride. He then taught at a high school and joined the University of Giessen in 1869, becoming a full professor and succeeding Justus von Liebig in 1882. He suggested in 1867 that molecules with an energy above a certain threshold could react with each other and that this energy could be provided through heat which increased the reaction rates. He defended this view connecting Newtonian mechanics to chemistry and wrote the first text on thermochemistry. In 1878 he examined the dissociation reaction of N_{2}O_{4} ⇌ NO_{2} to confirm the law of mass action. He also worked on the chlorination of butyric acid, and the esters of benzoic acid. He worked on chemical reaction kinetics and equilibria in his early career but was later involved in teaching organic chemistry. After becoming a professor he became more involved in administration and politics and retired in 1913.
