= Lomedeucitinib =

Clinical data
- Other names: BMS-986322

Identifiers
- IUPAC name: 4-{[3-(methylsulfonyl)pyridin-2-yl]amino}-6-[((2R)-spiro[2.2]pentane-2-carbonyl)amino]-N-(trideuteriomethyl)pyridazine-3-carboxamide
- CAS Number: 2328068-29-5
- PubChem CID: 138620496
- IUPHAR/BPS: 13210
- ChemSpider: 129427731
- UNII: EYQ7KA55XA
- KEGG: D12725
- ChEMBL: ChEMBL5314608

Chemical and physical data
- Formula: C_{18}H_{17}D_{3}N_{6}O_{4}S
- Molar mass: 419.47 g·mol^{−1}
- 3D model (JSmol): Interactive image
- SMILES: [2H]C([2H])([2H])NC(=O)c1nnc(NC(=O)[C@@H]2CC23CC3)cc1Nc1ncccc1S(C)(=O)=O
- InChI: InChI=1S/C18H20N6O4S/c1-19-17(26)14-11(21-15-12(29(2,27)28)4-3-7-20-15)8-13(23-24-14)22-16(25)10-9-18(10)5-6-18/h3-4,7-8,10H,5-6,9H2,1-2H3,(H,19,26)(H2,20,21,22,23,25)/t10-/m0/s1/i1D3; Key:VWIVBQZLVAGLMH-ASGODXDTSA-N

Lomedeucitinib is an investigational new drug that is being evaluated for the treatment of psoriasis and psoriatic arthritis. It is a tyrosine kinase 2 (TYK2) inhibitor.
