= Leopold von Pebal =

Austrian chemist (1826–1887)

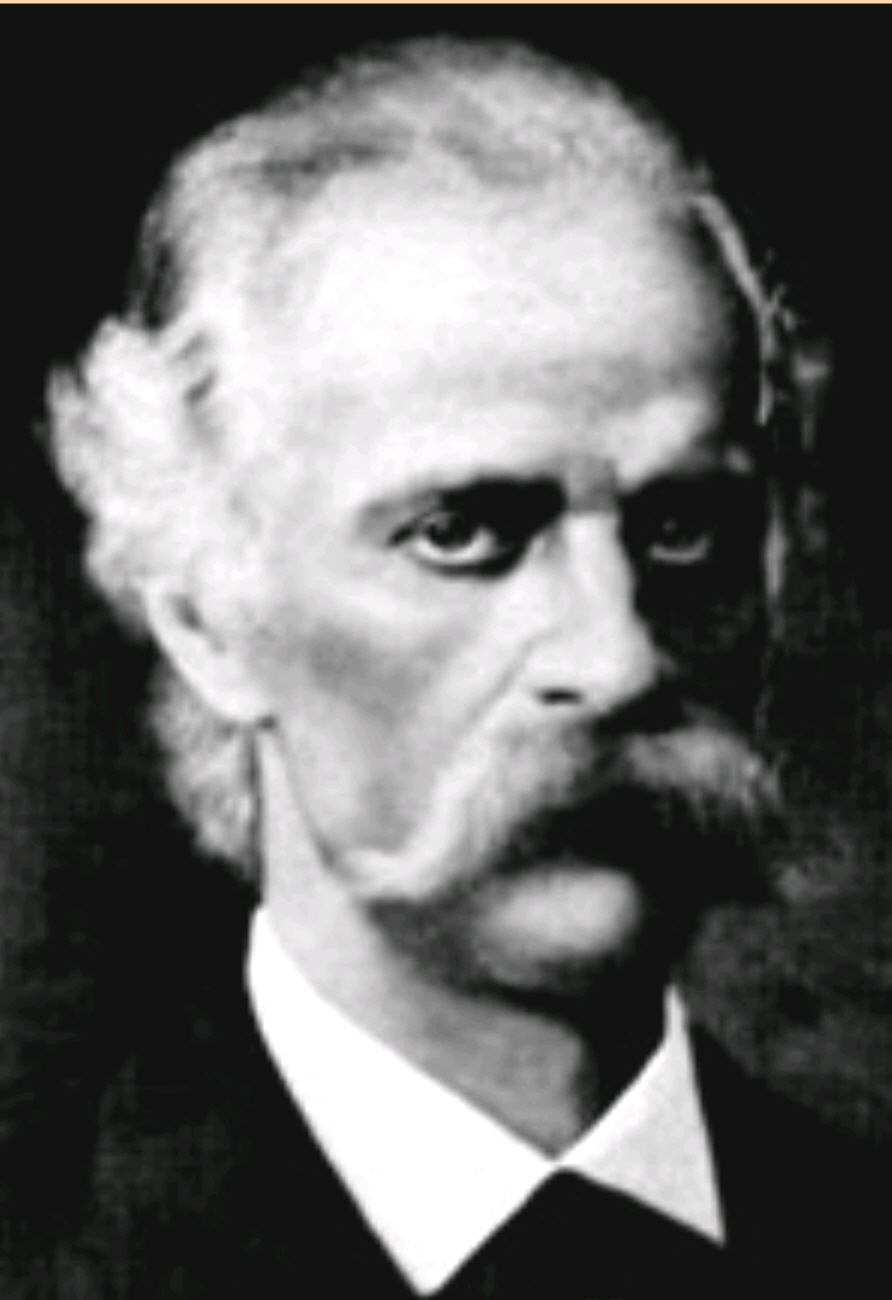
- Leopold von Pebal
- Born: 29 December 1826; Seckau, Austria
- Died: 17 February 1887 (aged 60); Graz, Austria

Leopold von Pebal (29 December 1826 – 17 February 1887) was an Austrian chemist.

In 1851 he obtained his PhD at the University of Graz, followed by several years working as an assistant at the Joanneum. In 1855 he became a privatdozent of theoretical chemistry. Afterwards, he continued his education at Heidelberg, where he studied with Robert Bunsen (1811–1899) and Gustav Kirchhoff (1824–1887). From 1857 onward, he worked as an associate professor at the University of Lviv.

Pebal remained a professor at Lemberg until 1865, after which, he became a professor at the University of Graz. He planned the new chemistry laboratory in Graz, which was finished in 1878. Charles Adolphe Wurtz (1817–1884) was sent by the French government to report about the laboratory. The possibility that the institute would be divided into two independent institutes troubled Pebal, but with the help of colleagues the problems were resolved. Pebal was murdered by an employee of the university in front of his laboratory, where he died shortly after the attack.

His wide-ranging research included studies involving the composition of stearic and citric acid.
