= Cyclopropane =

Cyclopropane - displayed formula
Cyclopropane - skeletal formula
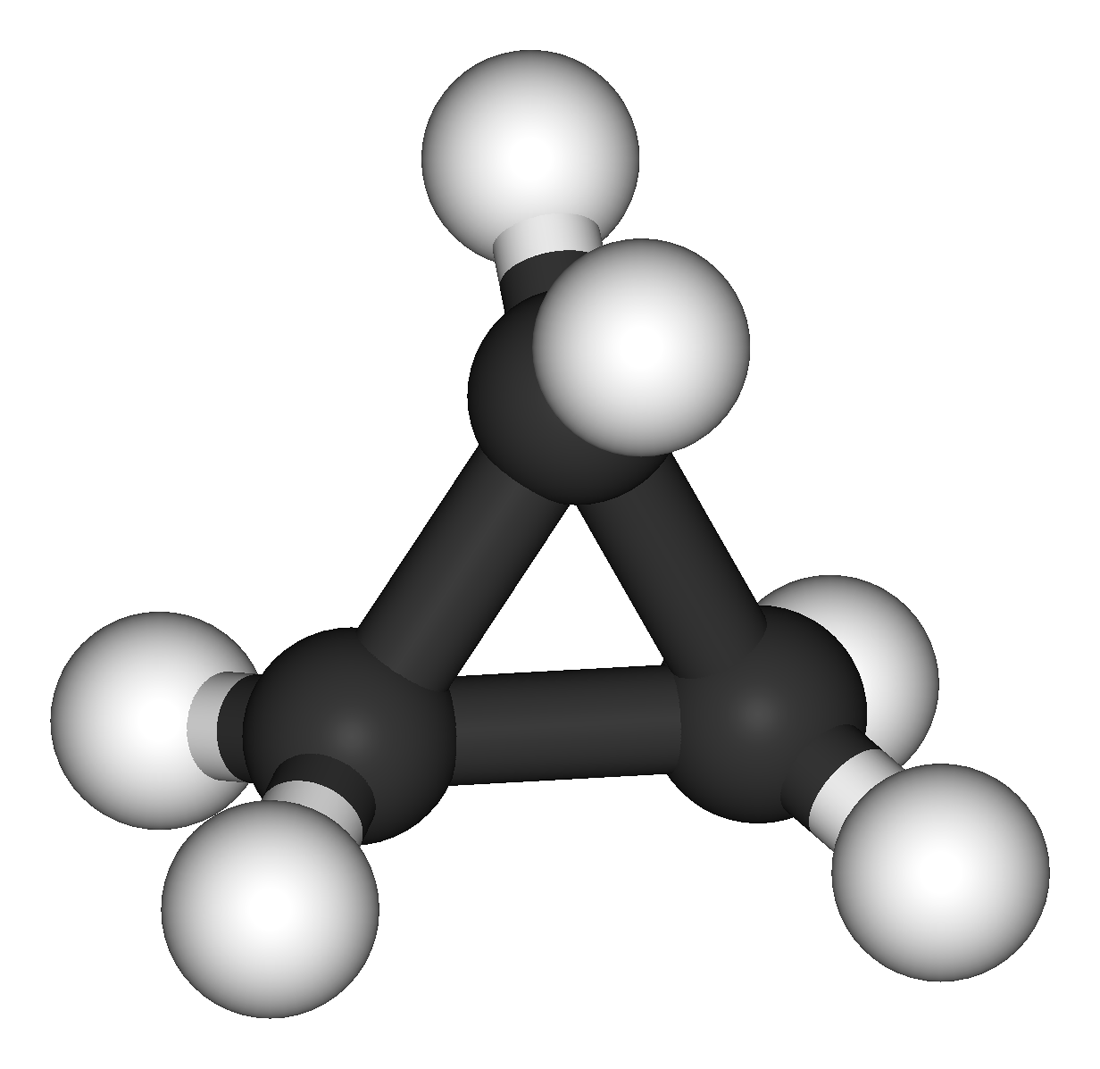

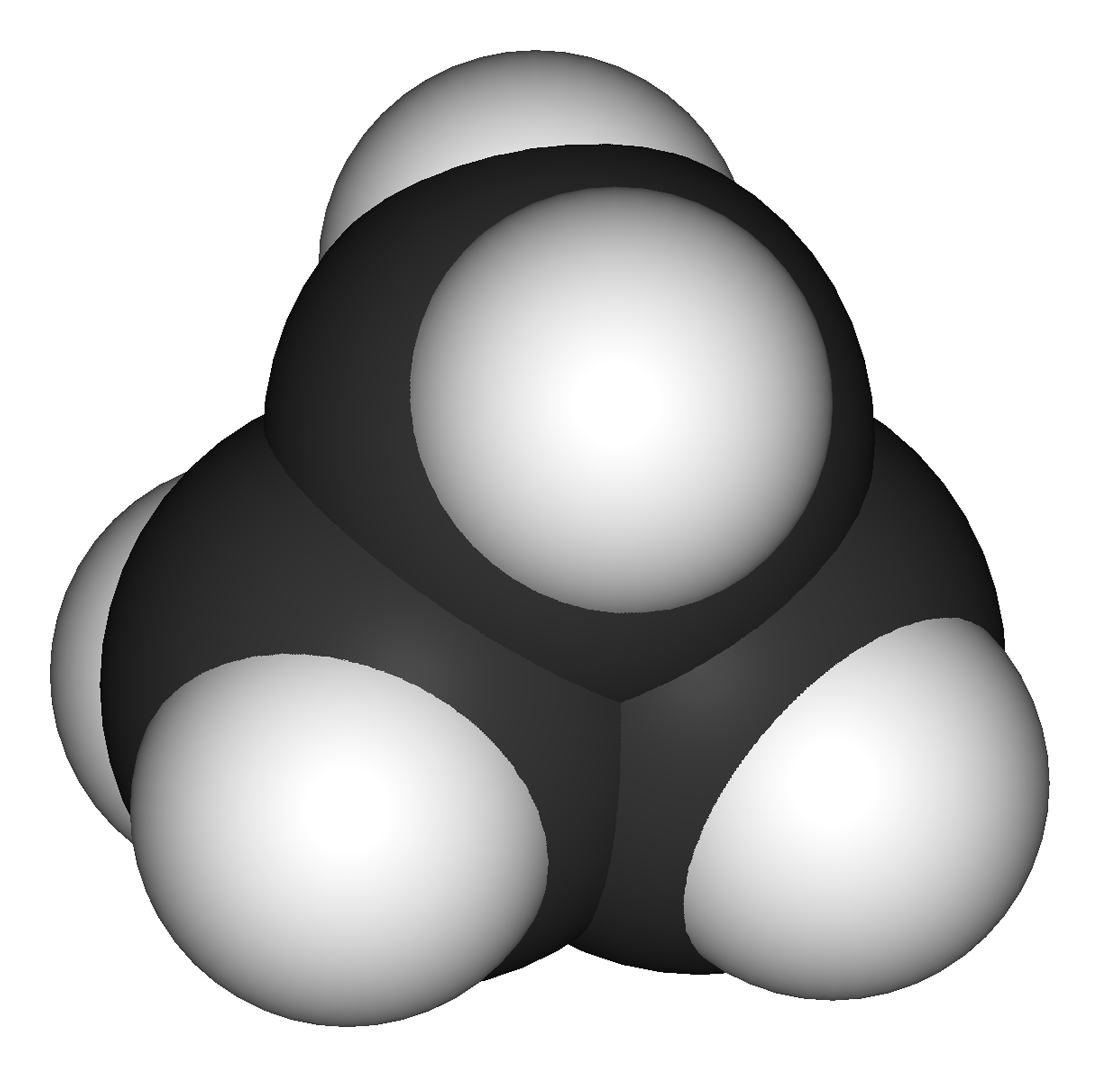

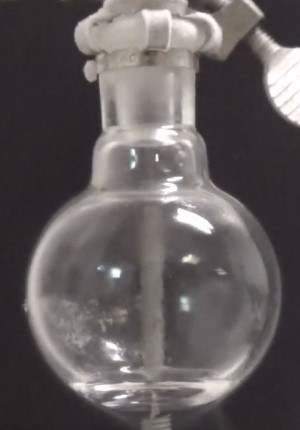

Names
- Preferred IUPAC name Cyclopropane

Identifiers
CAS Number	75-19-4
3D model (JSmol)	Interactive image
ChEBI	CHEBI:30365
ChEMBL	ChEMBL1796999
ChemSpider	6111
ECHA InfoCard	100.000.771
KEGG	D03627
PubChem CID	6351
UNII	99TB643425
UN number	1027
CompTox Dashboard (EPA)	DTXSID4058786
- InChI: InChI=1S/C3H6/c1-2-3-1/h1-3H2 Key: LVZWSLJZHVFIQJ-UHFFFAOYSA-N; InChI=1/C3H6/c1-2-3-1/h1-3H2 Key: LVZWSLJZHVFIQJ-UHFFFAOYAL
- SMILES: C1CC1

Properties
Chemical formula	C_{3}H_{6}
Molar mass	42.081 g·mol^{−1}
Appearance	Colorless gas
Odor	Sweet, ethereal
Density	1.879 g/L (1 atm, 0 °C); 680 g/L (liquid)
Melting point	−128 °C (−198 °F; 145 K)
Boiling point	−32.9 °C (−27.2 °F; 240.2 K)
Solubility in water	502 mg/L
Vapor pressure	640 kPa (20 °C); 1350 kPa (50 °C)
Acidity (pK_{a})	~46
Magnetic susceptibility (χ)	−39.9·10^{−6} cm^{3}/mol

Hazards
- Occupational safety and health (OHS/OSH)
Main hazards	Highly flammable Asphyxiant
- GHS labelling
Pictograms	(GHS02: Flammable)
Signal word	Danger
NFPA 704 (fire diamond)	1 4 0 SA
Autoignition temperature	495 °C (923 °F; 768 K)
Explosive limits	2.4 % (lower); 10.4 % (upper)
Safety data sheet (SDS)	Air Liquide
- Except where otherwise noted, data are given for materials in their standard state (at 25 °C [77 °F], 100 kPa). verify (what is ?) Infobox references

Cyclopropane is the cycloalkane with the molecular formula (CH_{2})_{3}, consisting of three methylene groups (CH_{2}) linked to each other to form a triangular ring. The small size of the ring creates substantial ring strain in the structure. Cyclopropane itself is mainly of theoretical interest, but many cyclopropane derivatives are of commercial or biological significance.

Cyclopropane was used as a clinical inhalational anesthetic from the 1930s through the 1980s. The substance's high flammability poses a risk of fire and explosions in operating rooms because of its tendency to accumulate in confined spaces, as its density is higher than that of air.

== History ==
Cyclopropane was discovered in 1881 by August Freund, who also proposed the correct structure for the substance in his first paper. Freund treated 1,3-dibromopropane with sodium, causing an intramolecular Wurtz reaction leading directly to cyclopropane. The yield of the reaction was improved by Gustavson in 1887 with the use of zinc instead of sodium. Cyclopropane had no commercial application until Henderson and Lucas discovered its anaesthetic properties in 1929; industrial production had begun by 1936. In modern anaesthetic practice, it has been superseded by other agents.

=== Anaesthesia ===
Cyclopropane was introduced into clinical use by the American anaesthetist Ralph Waters who used a closed system with carbon dioxide absorption to conserve this then-costly agent. Cyclopropane is a relatively potent, non-irritating and sweet smelling agent with a minimum alveolar concentration of 17.5% and a blood/gas partition coefficient of 0.55. This meant induction of anaesthesia by inhalation of cyclopropane and oxygen was rapid and not unpleasant. However at the conclusion of prolonged anaesthesia patients could suffer a sudden decrease in blood pressure, potentially leading to cardiac dysrhythmia: a reaction known as "cyclopropane shock". For this reason, as well as its high cost and its explosive nature, it was latterly used only for the induction of anaesthesia, and has not been available for clinical use since the mid-1980s. Liver dysfunction after cyclopropane anaesthesia was rare. Cylinders and flow meters were colored orange (now orange is used for the anesthetic gas enflurane).

=== Pharmacology ===
Cyclopropane is inactive at the GABA_{A} and glycine receptors, and instead acts as an NMDA receptor antagonist. It also inhibits the AMPA receptor and nicotinic acetylcholine receptors, and activates certain K_{2P} channels.

== Structure and bonding ==
Orbital overlap in the bent bonding model of cyclopropane

The triangular structure of cyclopropane requires the bond angles between carbon-carbon covalent bonds to be 60°. The molecule has D_{3h} molecular symmetry. The C-C distances are 151 pm versus 153-155 pm.

Despite their shortness, the C-C bonds in cyclopropane are weakened by 34 kcal/mol vs ordinary C-C bonds. In addition to ring strain, the molecule also has torsional strain due to the eclipsed conformation of its hydrogen atoms. The C-H bonds in cyclopropane are stronger than ordinary C-H bonds as reflected by NMR coupling constants.

Bonding between the carbon centres is generally described in terms of bent bonds. In this model the carbon-carbon bonds are bent outwards so that the inter-orbital angle is 104°.

The unusual structural properties of cyclopropane have spawned many theoretical discussions. One theory invokes σ-aromaticity: the stabilization afforded by delocalization of the six electrons of cyclopropane's three C-C σ bonds to explain why the strain of cyclopropane is "only" 27.6 kcal/mol as compared to cyclobutane (26.2 kcal/mol) with cyclohexane as reference with E_{str}=0 kcal/mol, in contrast to the usual π aromaticity, that, for example, has a highly stabilizing effect in benzene. Other studies do not support the role of σ-aromaticity in cyclopropane and the existence of an induced ring current; such studies provide an alternative explanation for the energetic stabilization and abnormal magnetic behaviour of cyclopropane.

== Synthesis ==
Cyclopropane was first produced via a Wurtz coupling, in which 1,3-dibromopropane was cyclised using sodium. The yield of this reaction can be improved by the use of zinc as the dehalogenating agent and sodium iodide as a catalyst.

BrCH_{2}CH_{2}CH_{2}Br + 2 Na → (CH_{2})_{3} + 2 NaBr

== Reactions ==
Owing to the increased π-character of its C-C bonds, cyclopropane is often assumed to add bromine to give 1,3-dibromopropane, but this reaction proceeds poorly. Hydrohalogenation with hydrohalic acids gives linear 1-halopropanes. Substituted cyclopropanes also react, following Markovnikov's rule.

Cyclopropane and its derivatives can oxidatively add to transition metals, in a process referred to as C–C activation.

== Safety ==
Cyclopropane is highly flammable. It forms explosive mixtures with oxygen.

== See also ==
- Tetrahedrane contains four fused cyclopropane rings that form the faces of a tetrahedron
- Propellane contains three cyclopropane rings that share a single central carbon-carbon bond.
- Spiropentane is two cyclopropane rings fused at a vertex
- Cyclopropene
- Methylenecyclopropane
