= Spiro compound =

Any chemical compound having one atom as the only common member of two rings

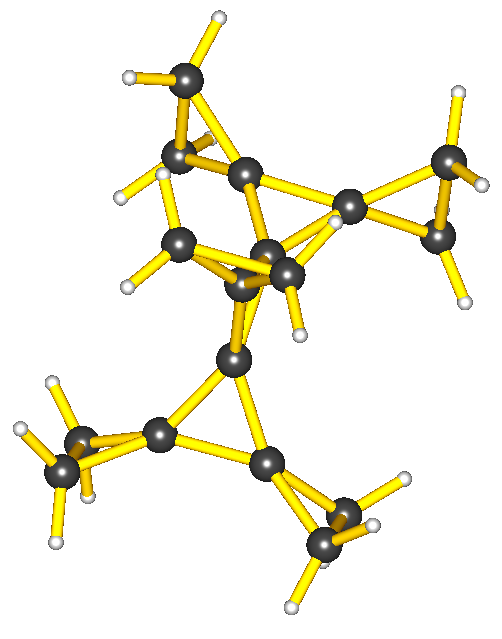
Structure of C_{17}H_{20}, which contains seven spiro atoms and eight cyclopropane rings

In organic chemistry, spiro compounds (/ˈspaɪroʊ/ or /ˈspɪəroʊ/) are compounds that have at least two molecular rings sharing one common atom. Simple spiro compounds are bicyclic (having just two rings). The presence of only one common atom connecting the two rings distinguishes spiro compounds from other bicyclics. Spiro compounds may be fully carbocyclic (all carbon) or heterocyclic (having one or more non-carbon atom). One common type of spiro compound encountered in educational settings is a heterocyclic one— the acetal formed by reaction of a diol with a cyclic ketone.

The common atom that connects the two (or sometimes three) rings is called the spiro atom. In carbocyclic spiro compounds like spiro[5.5]undecane, the spiro-atom is a quaternary carbon, and as the -ane ending implies, these are the types of molecules to which the name spirane was first applied (though it is now used general of all spiro compounds). The two rings sharing the spiro atom are most often different, although they can be identical [e.g., spiro[5.5]undecane and spiropentadiene, at right].

== Selected spiro compounds ==
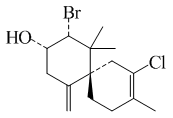
Elatol, isolated from Laurencia dendroidea (red algae)

Spironolactone, a commercial diuretic medication

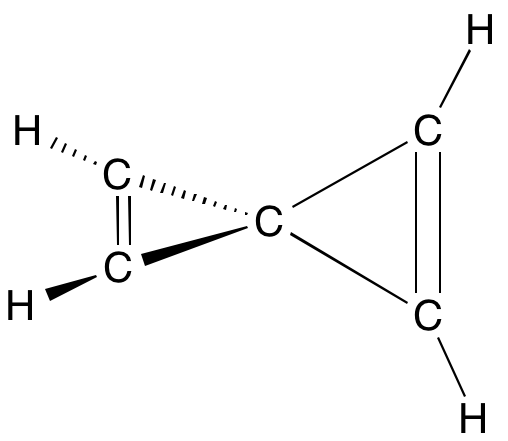
Spiropentadiene, which is highly strained.

(A) 1-Bromo-3-chlorospiro[4.5]decan-7-ol, and (B) '1-bromo-3-chlorospiro[3.6]decan-7-ol.

== Carbocyclic spiro compounds ==
Bicyclic ring structures in organic chemistry that have two fully carbocyclic (all carbon) rings connected through a carbon atom are the usual focus of the topic of spirocycles. Simple parent spirocycles include spiropentane, spirohexane, etc. up to spiroundecane. Several exist as isomers. Lower members of the class are strained. The symmetric isomer of spiroundecane is not.

Some spirocyclic compounds occur as natural products.

=== Preparation ===
Synthesis route to Fecht's acid, illustrating a dialkylation route to a spiroheptane.

Synthesis route to spiroundecane.

The spirocyclic core is usually prepared by dialkylation of an activated carbon center. The dialkylating group is often a 1,3-, 1,4-, etc. dihalide. In some cases the dialkylating group is a dilithio reagent, such as 1,5-dilithiopentane. For generating spirocycles containing a cyclopropane ring, cyclopropanation with cyclic carbenoids has been demonstrated.

Spiro compounds are often prepared by diverse rearrangement reactions. For example, the pinacol-pinacolone rearrangement is illustrated below. is employed in the preparation of aspiro[4.5]decane.].

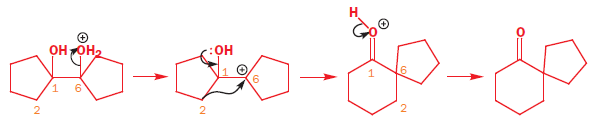
The synthesis of a spiro-keto compound form a symmetrical diol

== Heterocyclic spiro compounds ==
Preparation of a spiro ketal.

Spiro compounds are considered heterocyclic if the spiro atom or any atom in either ring are not carbon atoms. Cases with a spiro heteroatom such as boron, silicon, and nitrogen (but also other Group IVA [14] are often trivial to prepare. Many borate esters derived from glycols illustrate this case. Likewise, a tetravalent neutral silicon and quaternary nitrogen atom (ammonium cation) can be the spiro center. Many such compounds have been described.

Particularly common spiro compounds are ketal (acetal) formed by condensation of cyclic ketones and diols and dithiols. A simple case is the acetal 1,4-dioxaspiro[4.5]decane from cyclohexanone and glycol. Cases of such ketals and dithioketals are common.

== Chirality ==
Two enantiomers of a spiro diketone.

Spiranes can be chiral, in various ways. First, while nevertheless appearing to be twisted, they yet may have a chiral center making them analogous to any simple chiral compound, and second, while again appearing twisted, the specific location of substituents, as with alkylidenecycloalkanes, may make a spiro compound display central chirality (rather than axial chirality resulting from the twist); third, the substituents of the rings of the spiro compound may be such that the only reason they are chiral arises solely from the twist of their rings, e.g., in the simplest bicyclic case, where two structurally identical rings are attached via their spiro atom, resulting in a twisted presentation of the two rings. Hence, in the third case, the lack of planarity described above gives rise to what is termed axial chirality in otherwise identical isomeric pair of spiro compounds, because they differ only in the right- versus left-handed "twist" of structurally identical rings (as seen in allenes, sterically hindered biaryls, and alkylidenecycloalkanes as well). Assignment of absolute configuration of spiro compounds has been challenging, but a number of each type have been unequivocally assigned.

Some spiro compounds exhibit axial chirality. Spiroatoms can be the origin of chirality even when they lack the required four different substituents normally observed in chirality. When two rings are identical the priority is determined by a slight modification of the CIP system assigning a higher priority to one ring extension and a lower priority to an extension in the other ring. When rings are dissimilar the regular rules apply.

== Nomenclature and etymology ==
Nomenclature for spiro compounds was first discussed by Adolf von Baeyer in 1900. IUPAC provides advice on naming of spiro compounds.

The prefix spiro denotes two rings with a spiro junction. The main method of systematic nomenclature is to follow with square brackets containing the number of atoms in the smaller ring then the number of atoms in the larger ring, separated by a period, in each case excluding the spiroatom (the atom by which the two rings are bonded) itself. Position-numbering starts with an atom of the smaller ring adjacent to the spiroatom around the atoms of that ring, then the spiroatom itself, then around the atoms of the larger ring. For example, compound A in Image #4 above (Selected Spiro Compounds) is called 1-bromo-3-chlorospiro[4.5]decan-7-ol, and compound B is called 1-bromo-3-chlorospiro[3.6]decan-7-ol.
