= C5H8 =

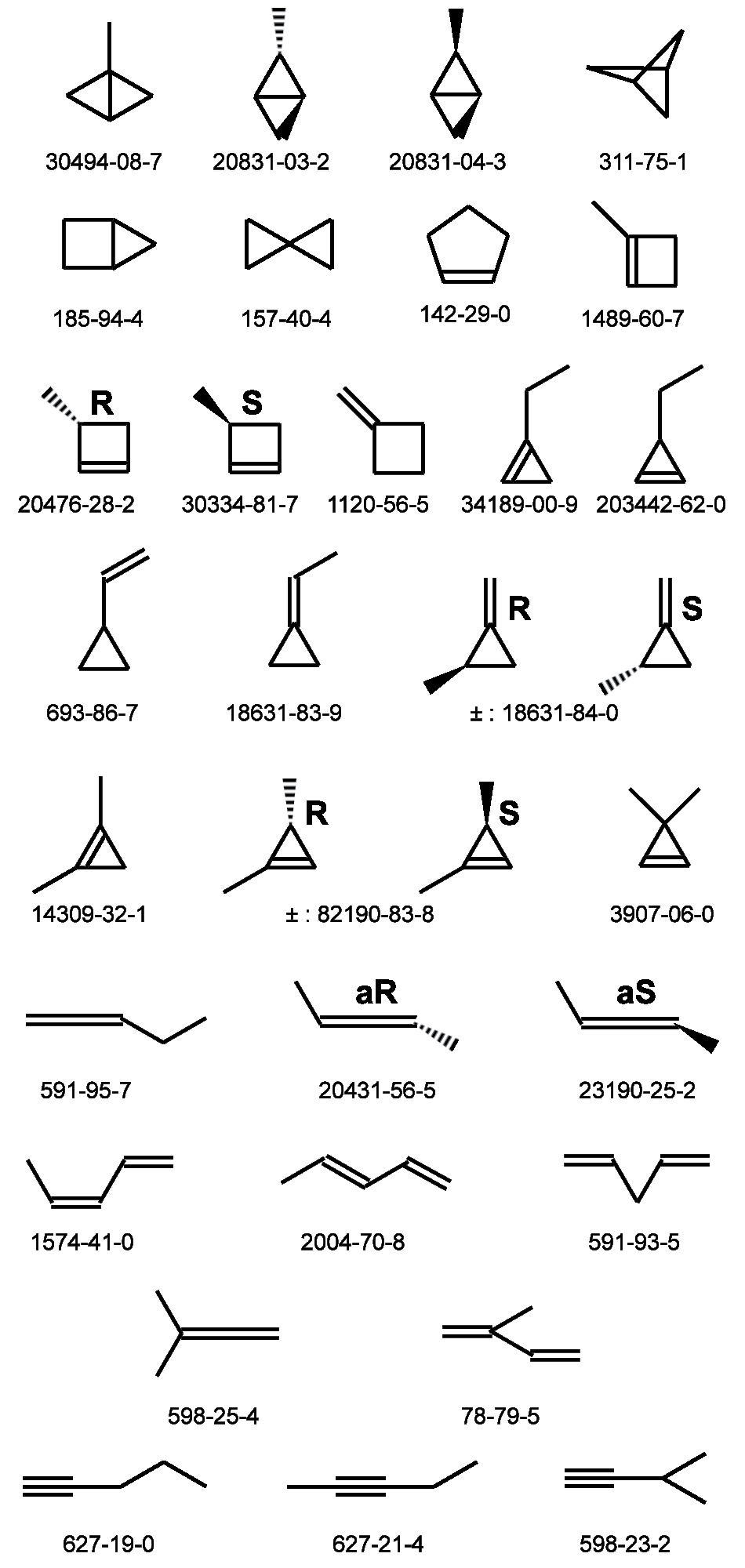
Constitution formula for isomers of C_{5}H_{8} with CAS numbers

The molecular formula C_{5}H_{8} may refer to any of the following hydrocarbons:

- Pentynes:

- 1-Pentyne
- 2-Pentyne
- 3-Methyl-1-butyne or isopentyne, CAS 598-23-2

- Pentadienes:

- 1,2-Pentadiene, two cis-z isomers, CAS 591-95-7
- 1,3 Pentadiene, CAS 504-60-9 (racemic mixture)

- cis-1,3-Pentadiene or (Z)-1,3-pentadiene, CAS 1574-41-0
- trans-1,3-Pentadiene or (E)-1,3-pentadiene, or Piperylene

- 1,4-Pentadiene, CAS 591-93-5
- 2,3-Pentadiene, two axial isomers, CAS 591-96-8 (racemic mixture)

- (R_{a})-2,3-Pentadiene, CAS 20431-56-5
- (S_{a})-2,3-Pentadiene, CAS 23190-25-2

- Butadiene derivatives:

- 3-Methyl-1,2-butadiene, CAS 598-25-4
- 2-Methyl-1,3-butadiene or isoprene

- Cyclopentene
- Cyclobutane derivatives:

- Methylenecyclobutane, CAS 1120-56-5

- Cyclobutene derivatives:

- 1-Methylcyclobutene, CAS 1489-60-7
- 3-Methylcyclobutene, CAS 1120-55-4 (racemic mixture)

- (R)-3-Methylcyclobutene, CAS 20476-28-2
- (S)-3-Methylcyclobutene, CAS 30334-81-7

- Cyclopropane derivatives:

- Ethenylcyclopropane or Vinylcyclopropane
- Ethylidenecyclopropane, CAS 18631-83-9
- 2-Methyl-1-methylenecyclopropane, CAS 18631-84-0 (racemic mixture)

- (R)-2-Methyl-1-methylenecyclopropane
- (S)-2-Methyl-1-methylenecyclopropane

- Cyclopropene derivatives:

- 1-Ethylcyclopropene, CAS 34189-00-9
- 3-Ethylcyclopropene, CAS 203442-62-0
- 1,2-Dimethylcyclopropene, CAS 14309-32-1
- 1,3-Dimethylcyclopropene, CAS 82190-83-8 (racemic)

- (R)-1,3-Dimethylcyclopropene
- (S)-1,3-Dimethylcyclopropene

- 3,3-Dimethylcyclopropene, CAS 3907-06-0

- Bicyclopentane

- Bicyclo[1.1.1]pentane, CAS 311-75-1
- Bicyclo[2.1.0]pentane or housane, CAS 185-94-4

- Spiro[2.2]pentane or spiropentane, CAS 157-40-4

== Functional groups ==
The formula may also represent a monovalent functional group derived from any hydrocarbon with formula C_{5}H_{9} by removal of one hydrogen atom; or a divalent group derived from C_{5}H_{10} minus two hydrogens; and so on.

== See also ==
- Vinylcyclopropane rearrangement
