= Paddlane =

General structure of [m.n.o.p]paddlane

In organic chemistry, paddlane is any member of a class of tricyclic saturated hydrocarbons having two bridgehead carbon atoms joined by four bridges. The name derives from a supposed resemblance of the molecule to a paddle wheel: namely, the rings would be the propeller's blades, and the shared carbon atoms would be its axis.

Systematically named tricyclo [m.n.o.p^{1,m+2}]alkanes, these compounds have been referred to as [m.n.o.p]paddlanes. The notation [m.n.o.p]paddlane means the member of the family whose rings have m, n, o, and p carbons, not counting the two bridgeheads; or m + 2, n + 2, o + 2, and p + 2 carbons, counting them. The chemical formula is therefore C_{2+m+n+o+p}H_{2(m+n+o+p)}. When p = 0, the compounds are propellanes.

== Compounds ==
[1.1.1.1]Paddlane

The best known paddlane is [1.1.1.1]paddlane which can be seen as a precursor to octahedrane (C_{6}), an allotrope of elemental carbon.

The American chemist Philip Eaton, famous for being the first to synthesize the "impossible" cubane molecule, has conducted studies for the synthesis of [2.2.2.2]paddlane. The first mention of paddlane goes back to 1973.

== See also ==
- Propellane
- Fenestrane
- Inverted tetrahedral geometry
