= Propellane =

Class of organic compounds with three rings sharing a single carbon bond

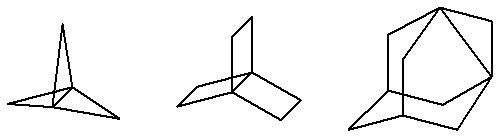
Some propellanes. From left to right: [1.1.1]propellane, [2.2.2]propellane, and 1,3-dehydroadamantane (a methylene-bridged derivative of [3.3.1]propellane).

In organic chemistry, propellane is any member of a class of polycyclic hydrocarbons, whose carbon skeleton consists of three rings of carbon atoms sharing a common carbon–carbon covalent bond. The concept was introduced in 1966 by D. Ginsburg. Propellanes with small cycles are highly strained and unstable, and are easily turned into polymers with interesting structures, such as staffanes. Partly for these reasons, they have been the object of much research.

== Nomenclature ==
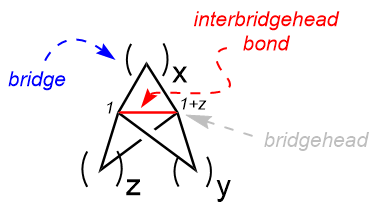
General nomenclature of carbocyclic Propellane.

The name derives from a supposed resemblance of the molecule to a propeller: namely, the cycloalkane rings would be the propeller's blades, and their shared C–C bond would be its axis. The bond shared by the three cycles is usually called the bridge; the shared carbon atoms are then the "bridgeheads".

The IUPAC nomenclature of the homologue series of all-carbon propellanes would be called tricyclo[x.y.z.0^{1,(x+2)}]alkane. More common in literature is the notation [x.y.z]propellane means the member of the family whose rings have x, y, and z carbons, not counting the two bridgeheads; or x + 2, y + 2, and z + 2 carbons, counting them. The chemical formula is therefore C_{2+x+y+z}H_{2(x+y+z)}. The minimum value for x, y, and z is 1, meaning three fused cyclopropyl-rings forming the [1.1.1]propellane. There is no structural ordering between the rings; for example, [1.3.2]propellane is the same substance as [3.2.1]propellane. Therefore, it is customary to sort the indices in decreasing order, x ≥ y ≥ z.

Further, heterosubstituted propellanes or structurally embedded propellane moieties exist and have been synthesised and follow a more complex nomenclature (see below).

== General properties ==
=== Strain ===
Propellanes with small cycles, such as [1.1.1]propellane or [2.2.2]propellane, bear a high absolute strain energy. The two interbridgeheaded carbons have an inverted tetrahedral geometry.

Computed Strain energies of Propellanes
| Propellane | Strain energy |
|---|---|
| [1.1.1]Propellane | 98 kcal mol^{−1} |
| [3.1.1]Propellane | 76 kcal mol^{−1} |
| [2.1.1]Propellane | 86 kcal mol^{−1} |
| [2.2.1]Propellane | 82 kcal mol^{−1} |
| [3.2.1]Propellane | 67 kcal mol^{−1} |

The resulting strain causes such compounds to be unstable and highly reactive. The interbridgehead C-C bond is easily broken (even spontaneously) to yield less-strained bicyclic or even monocyclic hydrocarbons. This so-called strain-release chemistry is used in strategies to access otherwise hard-to-obtain structures.

Surprisingly, the most strained member [1.1.1] is far more stable than the other small ring members ([2.1.1], [2.2.1], [2.2.2], [3.2.1], [3.1.1], and [4.1.1]), which can be explained by special bonding situation of the interbridgehead bond.

=== Bonding properties ===
The bonding situation of small-ring propellanes, such as [n.1.1]propellanes, is topic of debate. Recent computational studies explain the interbridgehead bond as a Charge-shift bond possessing an unusual positive Laplace operator $\nabla^2$ of the electron density $\rho$. Studies by Sterling et al. suggest delocalisation effects onto the three-membered bridges relaxing Pauli-repulsion and thus stabilising the propellane core.

=== Reactivity ===
Propellanes, especially the synthetically studied [1.1.1]Propellane, is known to possess omniphilic reactivity. Anions and radicals add towards the interbridgehead bond resulting in bicyclo[1.1.1]pentyl-units. In contrary, cations and metals decompose the tricyclic core towards monocyclic systems by opening of the bridged bonds forming exo-methylene cyclobutanes. For [3.1.1]propellane only radical addition is reported. The reactivity of other propellanes is far less explored and their reactivity profile is less clear.

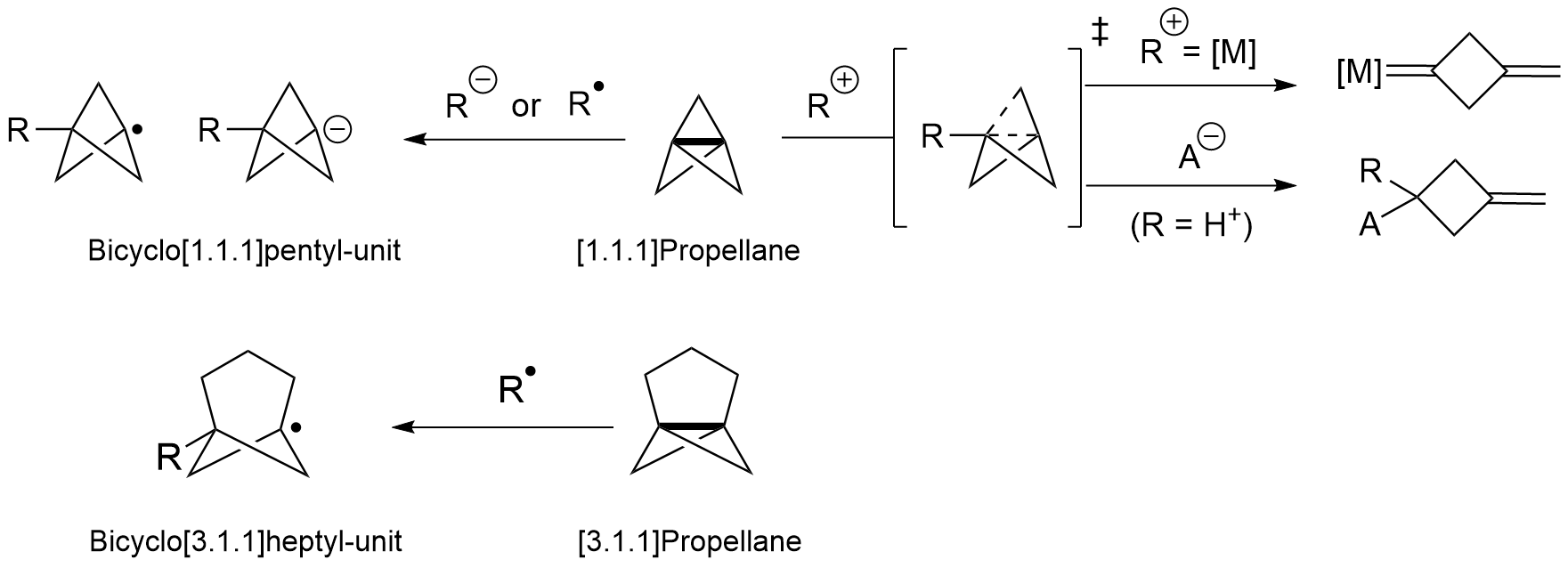
General reactivity profile of [1.1.1]Propellane and [3.1.1]Propellane

=== Polymerization ===
In principle, any propellane can be polymerized by breaking the axial C–C bond to yield a radical with two active centers, and then joining these radicals in a linear chain. For the propellanes with small cycles (such as [1.1.1], [3.2.1], or 1,3-dihydroadamantane), this process is easily achieved, yielding either simple polymers or alternating copolymers. For example, [1.1.1]propellane yields spontaneously an interesting rigid polymer called staffane; and [3.2.1]propellane combines spontaneously with oxygen at room temperature to give a copolymer where the bridge-opened propellane units [–C_{8}H_{12}–] alternate with [–O–O–] groups.

=== Synthesis ===
The smaller-cycle propellanes are difficult to synthesize because of their strain. Larger members are more easily obtained. Weber and Cook described in 1978 a general method which should yield [n.3.3]propellanes for any n ≥ 3.

== Members ==
=== True propellanes ===
- [1.1.1]Propellane, C_{5}H_{6}, CAS number 35634-10-7 (K. Wiberg and F. Walker, 1982). It is a highly strained molecule: the two central carbons have an inverted tetrahedron geometry, and each of the three cycles is the notoriously strained cyclopropane ring. The length of the central bond is only 160 pm. It is an unstable product that undergoes thermal isomerization to 3-methylenecyclobutene at 114 °C, and spontaneously reacts with acetic acid to form a methylenecyclobutane ester. Several synthetic procedures are established making it accessible on scales useful for synthesis to derive bicyclo[1.1.1]pentane which are used a bioisosteres for para-substituted arene systems.
- [2.1.1]Propellane, C_{6}H_{8}, CAS number 36120-91-9 (K. Wiberg, F. Walker, W. Pratt, and J. Michl). This compound was detected by infrared spectroscopy at 30 K but has not been isolated as a stable molecule at room temperature (as of 2003). It is believed to polymerize above 50 K. The bonds of the shared carbons have an inverted tetrahedral geometry; the compound's strain energy was estimated as 106 kcal/mol.
- [2.2.1]Propellane, C_{7}H_{10}, CAS number 36120-90-8 (F. Walker, K. Wiberg, and J. Michl, 1982). Obtained through gas-phase dehalogenation with alkali metal atoms. Stable only in frozen gas matrix below 50 K; oligomerizes or polymerizes at higher temperatures. The strain energy released by breaking the axial bond was estimated as 75 kcal/mol.
- [3.1.1]Propellane, C_{7}H_{10}, CAS number 65513-21-5 (Gassman, 1980; Szeimies, 1992; Anderson, 2022). Several synthetic procedures are established making it accessible on scales useful for synthesis to derive bicyclo[3.1.1]heptanes which are proposed as isosteres for meta-substituted arene systems.
- [3.2.1]Propellane or tricyclo[3.2.1.0^{1,5}]octane, C_{8}H_{12}, CAS number 19074-25-0 (K. Wiberg and G. Burgmaier, 1969). Isolable. Has inverted tetrahedral geometry at the shared carbons. Estimated strain energy of 60 kcal/mol. Remarkably resistant to thermolysis; polymerizes in diphenyl ether solution with halflife of about 20 hours at 195 °C. It reacts spontaneously with oxygen at room temperature to give a copolymer with –O–O– bridges.
- [4.1.1]Propellane, C_{8}H_{12}, CAS number 51273-56-4 (D. Hamon, V. Trennery, 1981) Isolable.
- [2.2.2]Propellane or tricyclo[2.2.2.0^{1,4}]octane, C_{8}H_{12}, CAS number 36120-88-4 (P. Eaton and G. Temme, 1973). This propellane is unstable, too, due to the three cyclobutane-like rings and the highly distorted bond angles (three of them nearly 90°, the other three nearly 120°) at the axial carbons. Its strain energy is estimated to be 93 kcal/mol (390 kJ/mol).
- [3.3.3]Propellane, C_{11}H_{18}, CAS number 51027-89-5 . It is a stable solid that melts at 130 °C. It was synthesized in 1978 by Robert W. Weber and James M. Cook who developed a general synthetic route for all [n, 3, 3]propellanes, with n ≥ 3:

- [4.3.3]Propellane, C_{12}H_{20}, CAS number 7161-28-6 (R. Weber and J. Cook, 1978). A stable solid that melts at 100–101 °C.
- [6.3.3]Propellane, C_{14}H_{24}, CAS number 67140-86-7 (R. Weber and J. Cook, 1978). An oily liquid that boils at 275–277 °C.
- [10.3.3]Propellane, C_{18}H_{32}, CAS number 58602-52-1 (S. Yang and J. Cook, 1976). A stable solid that sublimes at 33–34 °C.

=== Propellane derivatives ===
- 1,3-Dehydroadamantane, C_{10}H_{14} (Pincock and Torupka, 1969). This compound is formally derived from adamantane by removing two hydrogens and adding an internal bond. It can be viewed as [3.3.1]propellane (whose axis would be the new bond), with an extra methylene bridge between its two larger "propeller blades". It is unstable and reactive and can be polymerized.
- 2,4-Methano-2,4-dehydroadamantane: C_{11}H_{14} (Majerski, 1980) It can be interpreted as an adamantyl-caged [3.1.1]propellane derivative. A general reactivity profile was investigated showing similarities to the omniphilic behaviour of [1.1.1]propellane.

=== Propellane natural products ===
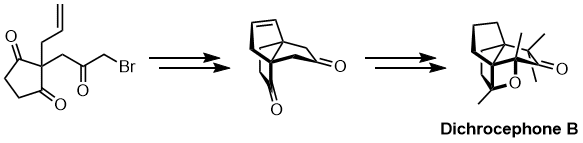
- Synthetic route toward dichrocephone B.
  Dichrocephone B, a sesquiterpenoid with a [3.3.3]propellane core was isolated in 2008 from Dichrocephala benthamii. It was first synthesized in 2018 using a general strategy for the synthesis of carbocyclic propellanes from 1,3-cycloalkanediones.

=== Propellenes ===
Propellane-like structures containing one or more double bonds are called propellenes. As with propellanes, those with moderate ring-sizes can be synthesized. Photoelectron spectroscopy of propellenes containing an alkene on two of the rings has been used to understand the interactions of those pi bonds.

[2.2.2]Propellatriene, which is three fused cyclobutene rings, is believed to have some stability, and has been studied theoretically in the context of unusually long carbon–carbon sigma bonds.
