= C8H12 =

The molecular formula C_{8}H_{12} may refer to:

- Cyclooctadienes
  - 1,3-Cyclooctadiene
  - 1,5-Cyclooctadiene
- Cyclooctyne
- [2.2.2]Propellane
- [4.1.1]Propellane
- 4-Vinylcyclohexene
