= C4F8 =

The molecular formula C_{4}F_{8} (molar mass: 200.03 g/mol, exact mass: 199.9872 u) may refer to:

- Octafluorocyclobutane, or perfluorocyclobutane
- Perfluoroisobutene (PFIB)
