= Pentyne =

Pentyne may refer to:

- 1-Pentyne (propyl acetylene)
- 2-Pentyne (ethyl methyl acetylene)
- 3-Methyl-1-butyne (isopropyl acetylene)
