= 1,3-Dehydroadamantane =

Names
- Preferred IUPAC name Tetracyclo[3.3.1.1^{3,7}.0^{1,3}]decane

Identifiers
CAS Number	24569-89-9
3D model (JSmol)	Interactive image
ChemSpider	124482
PubChem CID	141122
UNII	4RDA4M7V9J
CompTox Dashboard (EPA)	DTXSID40179305
- InChI: InChI=1S/C10H14/c1-7-2-9-4-8(1)5-10(9,3-7)6-9/h7-8H,1-6H2 Key: YNLPLYJBYLQXCY-UHFFFAOYSA-N; InChI=1/C10H14/c1-7-2-9-4-8(1)5-10(9,3-7)6-9/h7-8H,1-6H2 Key: YNLPLYJBYLQXCY-UHFFFAOYAN
- SMILES: C1C2CC34CC1CC3(C2)C4

Properties
Chemical formula	C_{10}H_{14}
Molar mass	134.222 g·mol^{−1}
- Except where otherwise noted, data are given for materials in their standard state (at 25 °C [77 °F], 100 kPa). Infobox references

1,3-Dehydroadamantane or tetracyclo[3.3.1.1^{3,7}.0^{1,3}]decane is an organic compound with formula C_{10}H_{14}, which can be obtained from adamantane by removal of two hydrogen atoms to create an internal bond. It is a polycyclic hydrocarbon, and can be viewed also as being derived from [3.3.1]propellane by addition of a methylene bridge between the two larger rings.

Like other small-ring propellanes, this compound is substantially strained and unstable.

== Synthesis ==
1,3-Dehydroadamantane was obtained in 1969 by Richard Pincock and Edward Torupka, by reduction of 1,3-dibromoadamantane according to the scheme below:

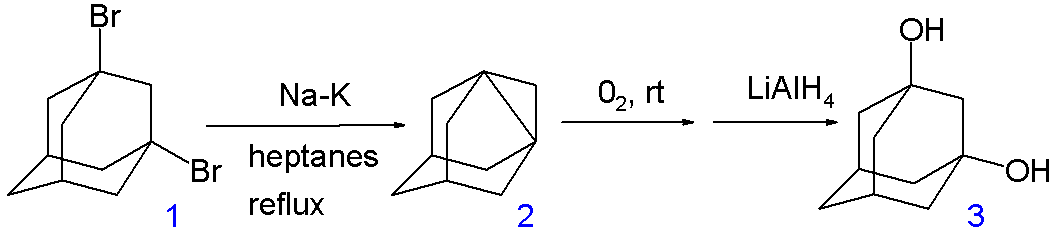
Scheme 1: 1,3-dehydroadamantane synthesis

== Reactions ==
=== Oxidation ===
On standing in solution, it reacts with oxygen from air (with a half-life of 6 hours), yielding a peroxide. The latter converts to a dihydroxide by reaction with lithium aluminium hydride.

=== Polymerization ===
Like [1.1.1]propellane, 1,3-dehydroadamantane can be polymerized by breaking the axial bond and joining the resulting radicals into a linear chain:

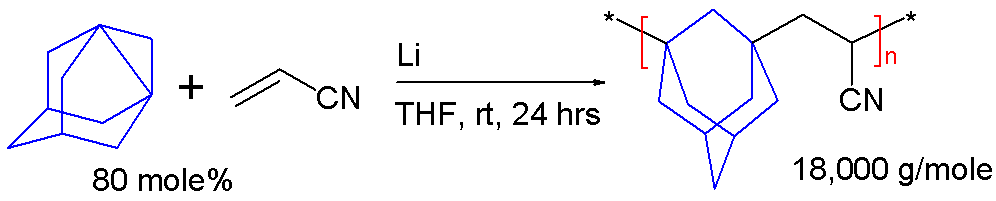
Scheme 2: Polymerization of 1,3-dehydroadamantane.

In this scheme, 1,3-dehydroadamantane is reacted with acrylonitrile in a radical polymerization initiated with lithium metal in tetrahydrofuran. The resulting alternating copolymer has a glass transition temperature of 217 °C

== See also ==
- [1.1.1]Propellane
- [2.2.2]Propellane
