= Fenestrane =

Chemical compound with four carbon rings sharing a single carbon atom

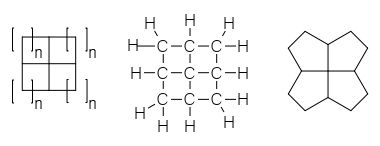
Fenestranes, from left to right: generic fenestrane, [4.4.4.4]fenestrane with carbon atoms shown and [5.5.5.5]fenestrane

A fenestrane in organic chemistry is a type of chemical compound with a central quaternary carbon atom which serves as a common vertex for four fused carbocycles. They can be regarded as spiro compounds twice over. Because of their inherent strain and instability, fenestranes are of theoretical interest to chemists. The name—proposed in 1972 by Vlasios Georgian and Martin Saltzman—is derived from the Latin word for window, fenestra. Georgian had intended that "fenestrane" solely referred to [4.4.4.4]fenestrane, whose skeletal structure looks like windows, and Kenneth B. Wiberg called that specific structure "windowpane". The term fenestrane has since become generalized to refer to the whole class of molecules that have various other ring-sizes. Georgian recommended rosettane for the class, based on the structural appearance as a rosette of flowers.

== Nomenclature and structure ==
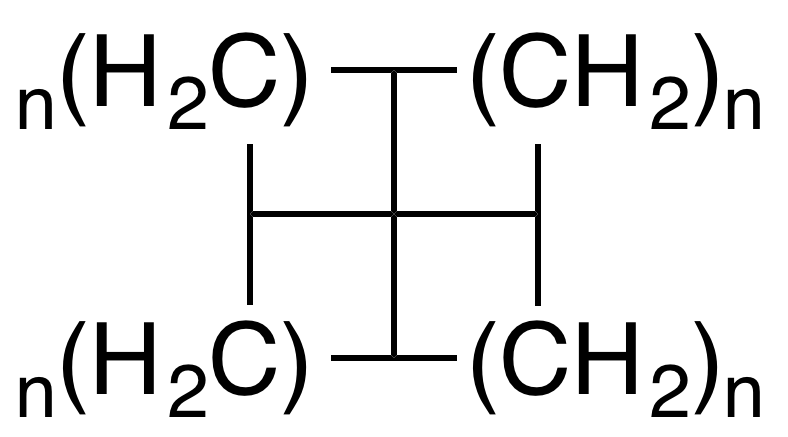
Fenestranes can have various numbers of atoms in the rings.

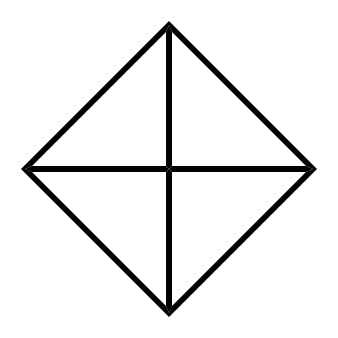
[3.3.3.3]Fenestrane is the smallest possible structure. See the § Pyramidanes section for discussion of its geometry.

Structures within this class of chemicals can be named according to the number of atoms in each ring in addition to the systematic nomenclature of IUPAC naming rules. The smallest member of the family, consisting of four fused cyclopropane rings, is [3.3.3.3]fenestrane, which has systematic name tetracyclo[2.1.0.0^{1,3}.0^{2,5}]pentane and is also called pyramidane. The next symmetric member, [4.4.4.4]fenestrane, has four cyclobutane rings fused, and has systematic name tetracyclo[3.3.1.0^{3,9}.0^{7,9}]nonane. The rings need not all be the same size as each other, so [4.4.4.5]fenestrane has three cyclobutane rings and one cyclopentane ring. Other structural modifications vary the name as usual in systematic nomenclature, so a [4.6.4.6]fenestradiene has two cyclobutane rings and two cyclohexane rings in an alternating pattern and two alkene units in the ring structure.

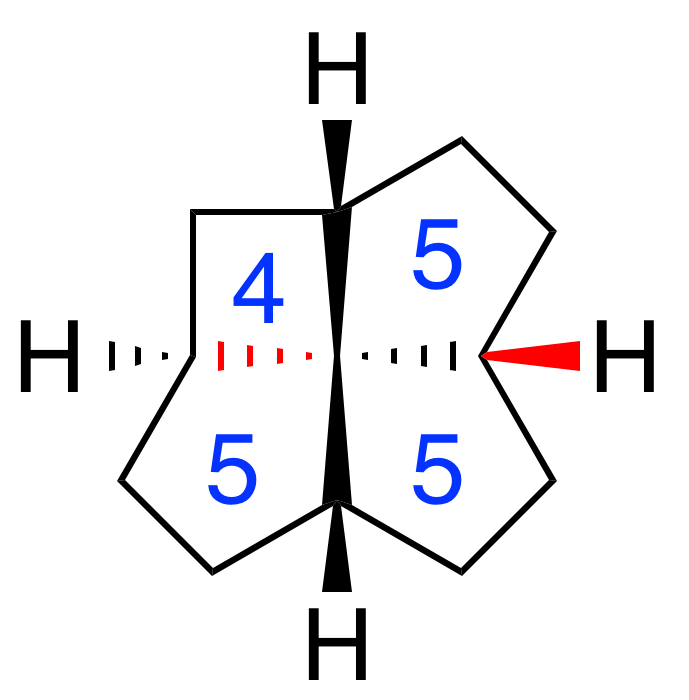
c,t,c,c-[4.5.5.5]Fenestrane, with ring-sizes and the one trans ring-fusion highlighted.

In addition to the ring sizes, fenestranes can have various combinations of cis and trans geometry at each ring fusion. These details are denoted by "c" and "t" prefixes to the structure name, listed in the same order as the ring-sizes. For example, c,t,c,c-[4.5.5.5]fenestrane has a trans configuration at one of the cyclopentane/cyclopentane fusions, but cis configuration at the other cyclopentane/cyclopentane fusion and at both butanepentane/cyclopentane fusions.

In an extreme case the central carbon atom, which would ordinarily have tetrahedral molecular geometry for its four bonds gets completely flattened. In the molecular orbital picture for the resulting square planar geometry of methane, two of a total of three sp^{2}-hybridized carbon atomic orbitals form regular bonds with two of the hydrogen atoms as in a planar alkene. The third sp^{2} orbital interacts in a three-center two-electron bond with the two remaining hydrogen atoms utilizing only the hydrogen electrons. Two additional carbon valence electrons are situated in a p orbital perpendicular to the plane of the molecule. The four C–H bonds are equal due to resonance. In silico calculations show that it takes 95 to 250 kcal/mol (400 to 1,050 kJ/mol) for this process.

One of the most highly strained fenestranes to have been isolated is a [4.4.4.5]fenestrane with bond angles at the central carbon atom of around 130° (based on X-ray crystallography), as compared to the 109.45° standard for tetrahedral atoms. The carbon–carbon bond-lengths deviate from those of normal alkanes as well. Whereas the C–C bond in ethane is 155 pm, in this fenestrane, the bonds extending from the central carbon atom are shortened to 149 pm while those at the perimeter are lengthened to 159 pm.

A diterpene called laurenene containing a [5.5.5.7]fenestrane ring system was the first natural fenestrane to be discovered. The first fenestrane ever synthesized was a [4.5.5.6]fenestrane:

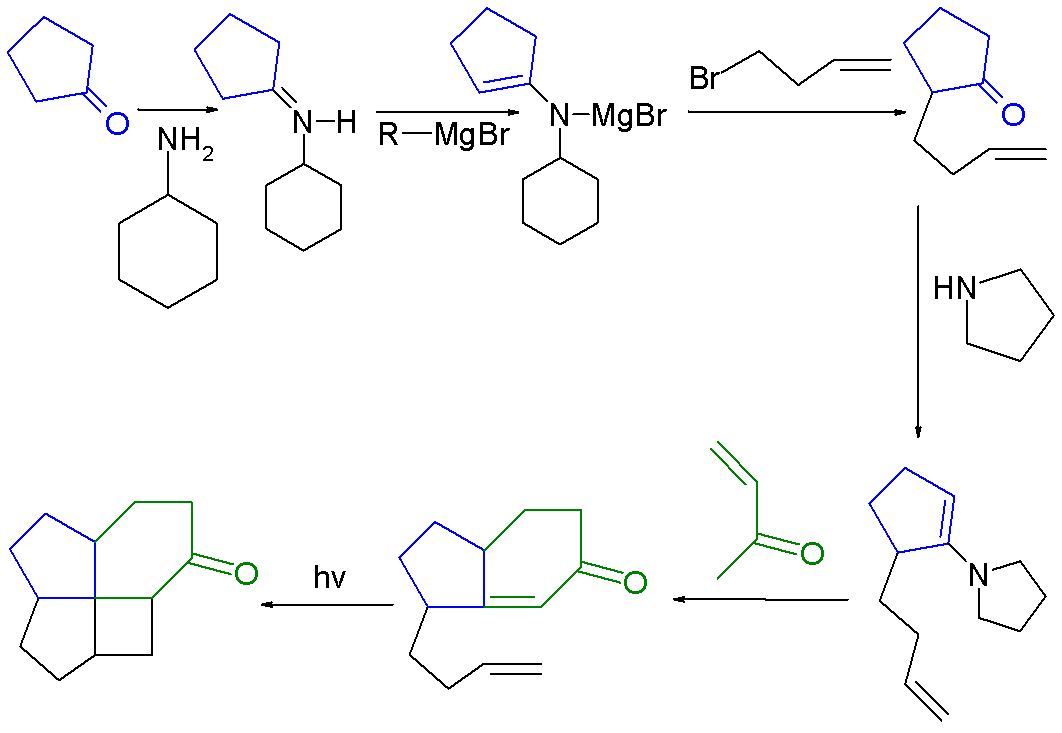
Fenestrane synthesis 1972

== Pyramidanes ==
Pyramidane ([3.3.3.3]fenestrane) is the smallest possible fenestrane, and has never been synthesised. If the central carbon were to be tetrahedral, it would have the form of spiropentadiene, but with additional bonds between the two cyclopropyl rings rather than double-bonds within them. The analogous germa- and stannapyramidanes, with trimethylsilyl groups bonded to the corners, Ge[C_{4}(SiMe_{3})_{4}] and Sn[C_{4}(SiMe_{3})_{4}] on the other hand have been synthesised. These adopt a square pyramidal geometry analogous to the trigonal pyramid of tetrahedrane, with the germanium or tin atom at the vertex. That atom has an inverted tetrahedral geometry. According to nuclear magnetic resonance analysis, the four carbons of the base of the pyramid behave as an aromatic ring.

== Synthetic approaches ==
In one study, a [4.5.5.5]fenestrane was synthesized with one carbon atom replaced by nitrogen because aza- compounds and their salts are more likely to form crystalline compounds suitable for X-ray analysis than low-molecular-weight alkanes. In step 1 the alkyl halide 1-iodo-3-butene 1 is converted to a cyanozinc cuprate 2 (by transmetalation of the organozinc iodide with copper cyanide) which reacts in the next step with 1-nitrocyclopentene 3 in a nucleophilic addition whereby the nitronate 4 is captured by phenylselenenyl bromide to the selenium intermediate 5. Hydrogen peroxide oxidation of 5 yields the nitroalkene 6 as a mixture of syn and anti isomers. A [4+2]cycloaddition with n-butylenol ether in presence of trimethylaluminium gives the nitronate 7 and a second [3+2]cycloaddition by heating in presence of potassium carbonate gives the nitroso acetal 8. Hydrogenation with Raney nickel gives the diol 9 which on a double Mitsunobu reaction (with an amine proton donor) gives the azafenestrane 10 as the borane salt.

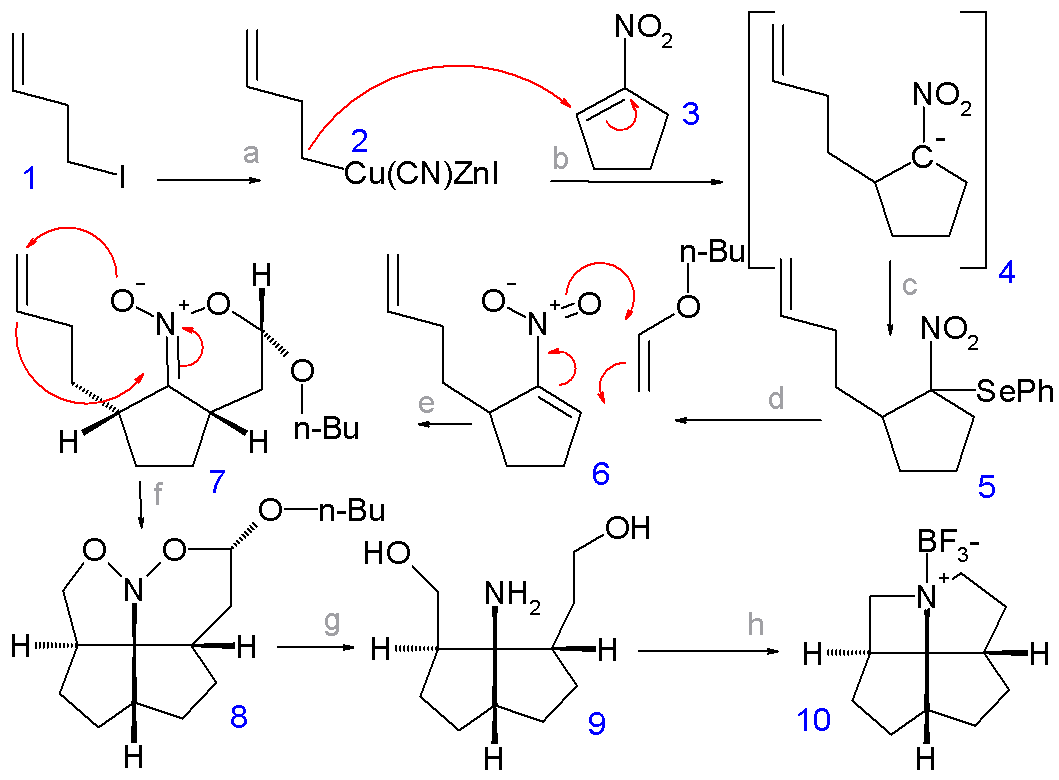
Azafenestrane synthesis 2006

In the borane salt the N–C–C bond angle is 126°.

One study describes an unusual 8π disrotatory – 6π conrotatory electrocyclic cascade reaction aiming to minimise the number of steps required to synthesise a fenestrane.

Fenestrane Hulot 2008

== See also ==
- Acepentalene
- Triquinacene
