= Bicyclobutane =

Names
- Preferred IUPAC name Bicyclo[1.1.0]butane

Identifiers
CAS Number	157-33-5
3D model (JSmol)	Interactive image
ChemSpider	119751
PubChem CID	135973
UNII	YK26N2Z3VC
CompTox Dashboard (EPA)	DTXSID50166180
- InChI: InChI=1S/C4H6/c1-3-2-4(1)3/h3-4H,1-2H2 Key: LASLVGACQUUOEB-UHFFFAOYSA-N
- SMILES: C1C2C1C2

Properties
Chemical formula	C_{4}H_{6}
Molar mass	54.092 g·mol^{−1}
Appearance	colorless gas
Boiling point	8.3 ± 0.2 °C
- Except where otherwise noted, data are given for materials in their standard state (at 25 °C [77 °F], 100 kPa). Infobox references

Bicyclo[1.1.0]butane is an organic compound with the formula C_{4}H_{6}. It is a bicyclic molecule consisting of two cis-fused cyclopropane rings, and is a colorless and easily condensed gas. Bicyclobutane is noted for being one of the most strained compounds that is isolatable on a large scale.

== Manufacture and properties ==
Bicyclobutane is highly strained — its strain energy is estimated at 63.9 kcal mol^{−1}. It is a nonplanar molecule, with a dihedral angle between the two cyclopropane rings of 123°.

The first reported bicyclobutane was the ethyl carboxylate derivative, C_{4}H_{5}CO_{2}Et, which was prepared by dehydrohalogenation the corresponding bromocyclobutanecarboxylate ester with sodium hydride. The parent hydrocarbon was prepared from 1-bromo-3-chlorocyclobutane by conversion of the bromocyclobutanecarboxylate ester, followed by intramolecular Wurtz coupling using molten sodium. The intermediate 1-bromo-3-chlorocyclobutane can also be prepared via a modified Hunsdiecker reaction from 3-chlorocyclobutanecarboxylic acid using mercuric oxide and bromine:

Stereochemical evidence indicates that bicyclobutane undergoes thermolysis to form 1,3-butadiene with an activation energy of 41 kcal mol^{−1} via a concerted pericyclic mechanism (cycloelimination, [σ2s+σ2a]).

== Derivatives ==
Bicyclo[1.1.0]butanes are explored in medicinal chemistry as covalent reactive groups.

In the simplest case, double cyclopropanation of acetylene with a copper catalyst gives a 1:1 mixture of cyclopropenes and symmetric bicyclobutanes. Other symmetric bicyclobutanes form from functionalization of benzvalene.

A synthetic approach to more substituted bicyclobutane derivatives involves ring closure of a suitably substituted 2-bromo-1-(chloromethyl)cyclopropane with magnesium in THF, or methyllithium in diethyl ether (lithium-halogen exchange).

Substituted bicyclo[1.1.0]butanes can also be prepared from the reaction of iodo-bicyclo[1.1.1]pentanes with amines, thiols, and sulfinate salts:

Bicyclo[1.1.1]pentanes to Bicyclo[1.1.0]butanes

== Biological synthesis ==
Linolenic acid can be converted into its bicyclobutane derivative using a fusion protein produced by a strain of the cyanobacterium Anabaena sphaerica (strain PCC 7120). The other group reported a directed evolution approach, whereby engineered heme protein was expressed in E. coli and optimized for rate and yield of a substituted bicyclobutane derivative.

== See also ==
- Propalene (Bicyclobutadiene)
- Bicyclopentane
- 1.1.1-Propellane
