= Laurenene =

Names
- Preferred IUPAC name (2aR,2a^{1}R,4aR,7R,10aS)-3,3,4a,7,10a-Pentamethyl-1,2,2a,3,4,4a,5,7,8,9,10,10a-dodecahydropentaleno[1,6-cd]azulene

Identifiers
CAS Number	72779-23-8
3D model (JSmol)	Interactive image
ChemSpider	10180858
PubChem CID	13818585
CompTox Dashboard (EPA)	DTXSID001336993
- InChI: InChI=1S/C20H32/c1-14-7-6-10-18(4)12-9-16-17(2,3)13-19(5)11-8-15(14)20(16,18)19/h8,14,16H,6-7,9-13H2,1-5H3/t14-,16-,18+,19-,20+/m1/s1 Key: TYDFDHZTDWVUJF-ULKVZQIESA-N
- SMILES: C[C@@H]1CCC[C@@]2(C)CC[C@@H]3C(C)(C)C[C@@]4(C)CC=C1[C@]324

Properties
Chemical formula	C_{20}H_{32}
Molar mass	272.476 g·mol^{−1}
- Except where otherwise noted, data are given for materials in their standard state (at 25 °C [77 °F], 100 kPa). Infobox references

Laurenene is a diterpene natural product with an unusual [5.5.5.7]fenestrane structure. It was first discovered in extracts from the New Zealand tree species Dacrydium cupressinum by researchers at the University of Otago. It has since been found in other species of New Zealand trees, such as Podocarpus totara.
