= Octachlorocyclobutane =

Names
- Preferred IUPAC name 1,1,2,2,3,3,4,4-octachlorocyclobutane
- Other names Perchlorocyclobutane

Identifiers
CAS Number	7294-43-1
3D model (JSmol)	Interactive image
ChemSpider	21781692
PubChem CID	12575466
CompTox Dashboard (EPA)	DTXSID401286934
- InChI: InChI=1S/C4Cl8/c5-1(6)2(7,8)4(11,12)3(1,9)10 Key: HOVMXJUERDYORX-UHFFFAOYSA-N
- SMILES: C1(C(C(C1(Cl)Cl)(Cl)Cl)(Cl)Cl)(Cl)Cl

Properties
Chemical formula	C_{4}Cl_{8}
Molar mass	331.64 g·mol^{−1}
Density	2.16 g/cm^{3}
Melting point	259 °C (498 °F; 532 K)
Boiling point	275 °C (527 °F; 548 K)
- Except where otherwise noted, data are given for materials in their standard state (at 25 °C [77 °F], 100 kPa). Infobox references

Octachlorocyclobutane is an organochlorine compound of carbon and chlorine with the chemical formula C_{4}Cl_{8}. The molecule consists of a cyclobutane ring where all eight hydrogen atoms are replaced by chlorine atoms and where each carbon atom is bonded to two chlorine atoms. The octachlorocyclobutane ring is nonplanar with relatively long carbon-carbon bonds for cyclobutane derivative. It has low strain energy.

== Synthesis ==
Pyrolysis of octachlorosulfolane at 340-350 °C gives octachlorocyclobutane at a high yield.

Octachlorocyclobutane cannot be made from tetrachloroethylene as its fluorinated analogue octafluorocyclobutane would be made from the dimerisation of tetrafluoroethylene.

== See also ==
- Octafluorocyclobutane
