= Charge-shift bond =

Proposed class of chemical bonds

In theoretical chemistry, the charge-shift bond is a proposed new class of chemical bonds that sits alongside the three familiar families of covalent, ionic, and metallic bonds where electrons are shared or transferred respectively. The charge shift bond derives its stability from the resonance of ionic forms rather than the covalent sharing of electrons which are often depicted as having electron density between the bonded atoms. A feature of the charge shift bond is that the predicted electron density between the bonded atoms is low. It has long been known from experiment that the accumulation of electric charge between the bonded atoms is not necessarily a feature of covalent bonds.

An example where charge shift bonding has been used to explain the low electron density found experimentally is in the central bond between the inverted tetrahedral carbon atoms in [1.1.1]propellanes. Theoretical calculations on a range of molecules have indicated that a charge shift bond is present, a striking example being fluorine, F_{2}, which is normally described as having a typical covalent bond. The charge shift bond (CSB) has also been shown to exist at the cation-anion interface of protic ionic liquids (PILs). The authors have also shown how CSB character in PILs correlates with their physicochemical properties.

== Valence bond description ==
The valence bond view of chemical bonding that owes much to the work of Linus Pauling is familiar to many, if not all, chemists. The basis of Pauling's description of the chemical bond is that an electron pair bond involves the mixing, resonance, of one covalent and two ionic structures. In bonds between two atoms of the same element, homonuclear bonds, Pauling assumed that the ionic structures make no appreciable contribution to the overall bonding. This assumption followed on from published calculations for the hydrogen molecule in 1933 by Weinbaum and by James and Coolidge that showed that the contribution of ionic forms amounted to only a small percentage of the H−H bond energy. For heteronuclear bonds, A−X, Pauling estimated the covalent contribution to the bond dissociation energy as being the mean of the bond dissociation energies of homonuclear A−A and X−X bonds. The difference between the mean and the observed bond energy was assumed to be due to the ionic contribution. The calculation for HCl is shown below.

	Actual H−H	Actual Cl−Cl	H−Cl_{cov} Covalent bond energy H−Cl, arithmetic mean (H−H) and (Cl−Cl)	H−Cl_{act} Actual H−Cl	"Ionic contribution" H−Cl_{act} – H−Cl_{cov}
Bond dissociation energy(kcal mol^{−1})	103.5	57.8	80.6	102.7	22.1

The ionic contribution to the overall bond dissociation energy was attributed to the difference in electronegativity between the A and X, and these differences were the starting point for Pauling's calculation of the individual electronegativities of the elements. The proponents of charge shift bond bonding re−examined the validity of Pauling's assumption that ionic forms make no appreciable contribution to the overall bond dissociation energies of homonuclear bonds. What they found using modern valence bond methods was that in some cases the contribution of ionic forms was significant, the most striking example being F_{2}, fluorine, where their calculations indicate that the bond energy of the F−F bond is due wholly to the ionic contribution.

== Calculated bond energies ==
The contribution of ionic resonance structures has been termed the charge−shift resonance energy, RE_{cs}, and values have been calculated for a number of single bonds, some of which are shown below:

	Covalent contribution kcal mol^{−1}	RE_{cs} kcal mol^{−1}	% RE_{cs} contribution
H−H	95.8	9.2	8.8
Li−Li	18.2	2.8	13.1
H_{3}C−CH_{3}	63.9	27.2	30.2
H_{2}N−NH_{2}	22.8	43.8	65.7
HO−OH	–7.1	56.9	114.3
F−F	–28.4	62.2	183.9
Cl−Cl	–9.4	48.7	124.1
H−F	33.2	90.8	73.2
H−Cl	57.1	34.9	37.9
H_{3}C−Cl	34.0	45.9	57.4
H_{3}Si−Cl	37.0	65.1	63.8

The results show that for homonuclear bonds the charge shift resonance energy can be significant, and for F_{2} and Cl_{2} show it is the attractive component whereas the covalent contribution is repulsive. The reduced density along the bond axis density is apparent using ELF, electron localization function, a tool for determining electron density.

=== The bridge bond in a propellane ===
The bridge bond (inverted bond between the bridgehead atoms which is common to the three cycles) in a substituted [1.1.1]propellane has been examined experimentally. A theoretical study on [1.1.1]propellane has shown that it has a significant RE_{cs} stabilisation energy.

== Factors causing charge shift bonding ==
Analysis of a number of compounds where charge shift resonance energy is significant shows that in many cases elements with high electronegativities are involved and these have smaller orbitals and are lone pair rich. Factors that reduce the covalent contribution to the bond energy include poor overlap of bonding orbitals, and the lone pair bond weakening effect where repulsion due to the Pauli exclusion principle is the main factor. There is no correlation between the charge−shift resonance energy RE_{cs} and the difference between the electronegativities of the bonded atoms as might be expected from the Pauling bonding model, however there is a global correlation between RE_{cs} and the sum of their electronegativities which can be accounted for in part by the lone pair bond weakening effect. The charge-shift nature of the inverted bond in [1.1.1]propellanes has been ascribed to the Pauli repulsion due to the adjacent "wing" bonds destabilising of the covalent contribution.

== Experimental evidence for charge-shift bonds ==
The interpretation of experimentally determined electron density in molecules often uses AIM theory. In this the electron density between the atomic nuclei along the bond path are calculated, and the bond critical point where the density is at a minimum is determined. The factors that determine the type of chemical bond are the Laplacian and the electron density at the bond critical point. At the bond critical point a typical covalent bond has significant density and a large negative Laplacian. In contrast a "closed shell" interaction as in an ionic bond has a small electron density and a positive Laplacian. A charge shift bond is expected to have a positive or small Laplacian. Only a limited number of experimental determinations have been made, compounds with bonds with a positive Laplacian are the N–N bond in solid N_{2}O_{4}, and the (Mg−Mg)^{2+} diatomic structure.
