= Bicyclopentane =

Bicyclopentane may refer to:

- Bicyclo[1.1.1]pentane
- Bicyclo[2.1.0]pentane (housane)
- Bicyclopentyl (cyclopentylcyclopentane)

== See also ==
- Bicyclic compound
- Bicyclobutane
- Spiropentane
