= 1.1.1-Propellane =

Highly-strained hydrocarbon ring compound

[1.1.1]Propellane

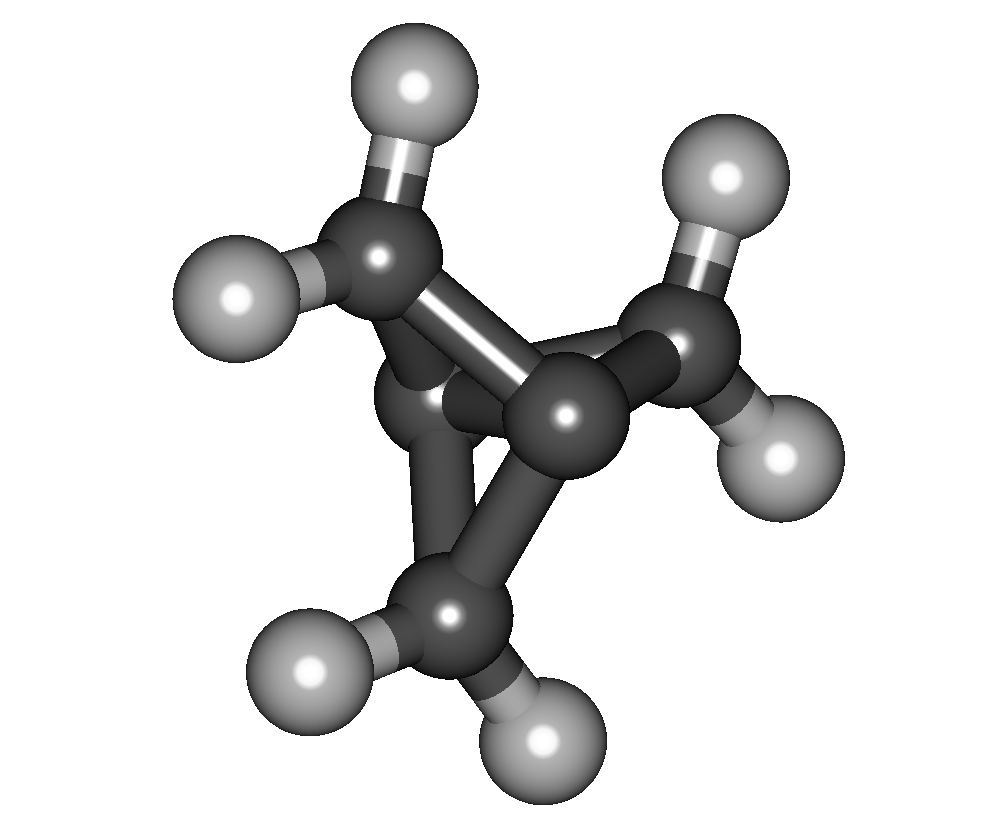

Names
- Preferred IUPAC name Tricyclo[1.1.1.0^{1,3}]pentane

Identifiers
CAS Number	35634-10-7
3D model (JSmol)	Interactive image
ChemSpider	125285
PubChem CID	142022
UNII	B99AQN9D35
CompTox Dashboard (EPA)	DTXSID20189149
- InChI: InChI=1S/C5H6/c1-4-2-5(1,4)3-4/h1-3H2 Key: ZTXSPLGEGCABFL-UHFFFAOYSA-N
- SMILES: C1(C2)(C3)C23C1

Properties
Chemical formula	C_{5}H_{6}
Molar mass	66.103 g·mol^{−1}
- Except where otherwise noted, data are given for materials in their standard state (at 25 °C [77 °F], 100 kPa). verify (what is ?) Infobox references

[1.1.1]Propellane is an organic compound, the simplest member of the propellane family. It is a hydrocarbon with formula C_{5}H_{6} or C_{2}(CH_{2})_{3}. The molecular structure consists of three rings of three carbon atoms each, sharing one C–C bond.

[1.1.1]Propellane is a highly strained molecule. The bonds of the two central carbon atoms have an inverted tetrahedral geometry, and the length of the central bond is 160 pm. The strength of that bond is disputed; estimates vary from 59–65 kcal/mol to no strength at all. The energy of the biradical state (with no central bond at all) is calculated to be 80 kcal/mol higher. At 114 °C it will spontaneously isomerize to 3-methylidenecyclobutene (5 below) with a half-life of 5 minutes. Its strain energy is estimated to be 102 kcal/mol (427 kJ/mol). Surprisingly, [1.1.1]propellane is persistent at room temperature and is somewhat less susceptible to thermal decomposition than the less strained (90 kcal/mol) [2.2.2]propellane system, which has an estimated half-life of only about 1 h at 25 °C. This unusual stability is attributed to delocalisation of electron density from the bond between the central carbon atoms onto the bridging carbon atoms.

The type of bonding in this molecule has been explained in terms of charge-shift bonding.

== Synthesis ==
[1.1.1]Propellane was first reported by Kenneth B. Wiberg and F. Walker in 1982, according to the second line in the following scheme. Synthesis begins with conversion of the 1,3-di-carboxylic acid of bicyclo[1.1.1]pentane 1 in a Hunsdiecker reaction to the corresponding dibromide 2 followed by a coupling reaction with n-butyllithium. The final product 3 was isolated by column chromatography at −30 °C:

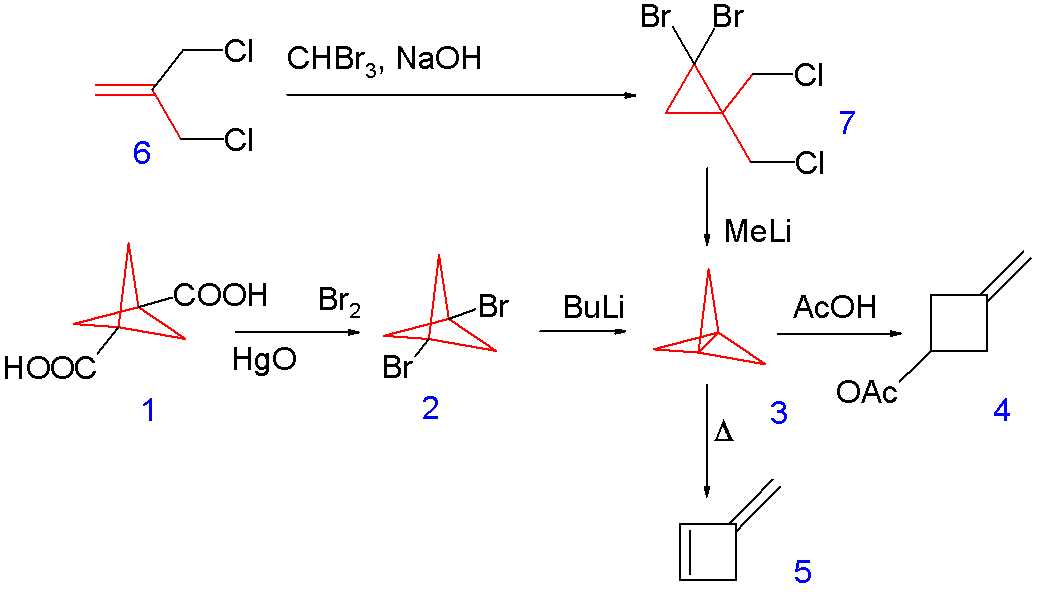
Scheme 1. Synthesis of [1.1.1]propellane

However, a much simplified synthesis was published by Szeimies. It starts with dibromocarbene addition to the alkene bond of 3-chloro-2-(chloromethyl)propene 6 followed by deprotonation by methyllithium and nucleophilic displacements in 7. The product was not isolated but kept in solution at −196 °C.

== Reactions ==
=== Acetic acid addition ===
[1.1.1]Propellane spontaneously reacts with acetic acid to yield a methylidenecyclobutane ester (4 above).

=== Polymerization ===
[1.1.1]Propellane undergoes a polymerization reaction where the central C–C bond is split and connected to adjacent monomer units, resulting in staffanes.

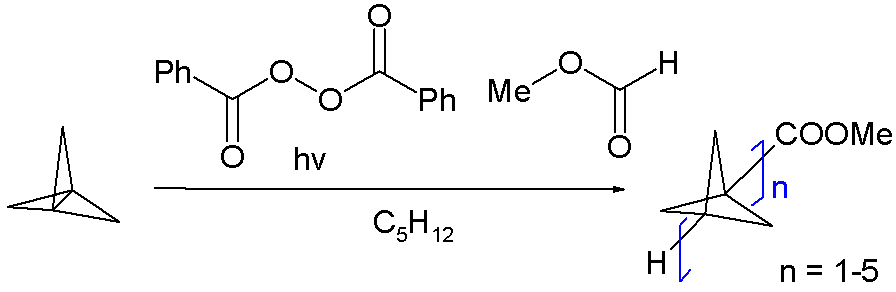
Scheme 2. Synthesis of [n]staffane

A radical polymerization initiated by methyl formate and benzoyl peroxide results in a distribution of oligomers. An anionic addition polymerization with n-butyllithium results in a fully polymerized product. X-ray diffraction of the polymer shows that the connecting C–C bonds have bond lengths of only 1.48 Å, significantly shorter than the normal 1.54 Å.

The compound 1,3-dehydroadamantane, which can be viewed as a bridged [1.3.3]propellane, also polymerizes in a similar way.

== See also ==
- [2.2.2]Propellane
- Bicyclo[1.1.1]pentane which lacks a bond between the bridgehead carbons.
