= Bicyclo(1.1.1)pentane =

Chemical compound

bicyclo[1.1.1]pentane

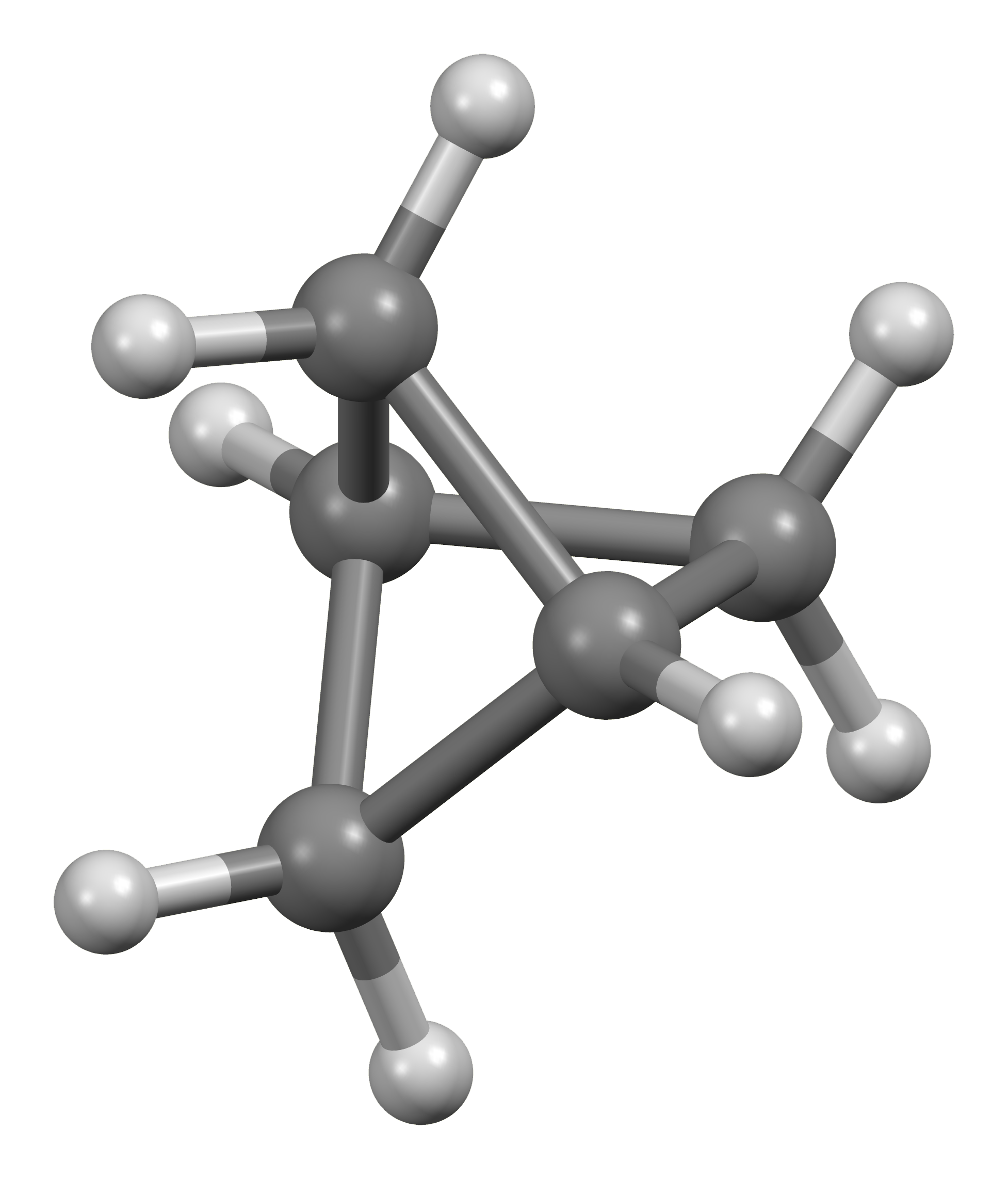

Names
- Preferred IUPAC name Bicyclo[1.1.1]pentane

Identifiers
CAS Number	311-75-1
3D model (JSmol)	Interactive image
ChemSpider	119929
PubChem CID	136153
CompTox Dashboard (EPA)	DTXSID60185044
- InChI: InChI=1S/C5H8/c1-4-2-5(1)3-4/h4-5H,1-3H2 Key: MKCBRYIXFFGIKN-UHFFFAOYSA-N
- SMILES: C1C2CC1C2

Properties
Chemical formula	C_{5}H_{8}
Molar mass	68.119 g·mol^{−1}
- Except where otherwise noted, data are given for materials in their standard state (at 25 °C [77 °F], 100 kPa). Infobox references

Bicyclo[1.1.1]pentane is an organic compound, the simplest member of the bicyclic bridged compounds family. It is a hydrocarbon with formula C_{5}H_{8}. The molecular structure consists of three rings of four carbon atoms each.

Bicyclo[1.1.1]pentane is a highly strained molecule.

== Usage ==
[1.1.1]Propellane

Kenneth Wiberg and Frederick Walker used a bicyclo[1.1.1]pentane derivative to make [1.1.1]propellane. Conversely, some substituted bicyclo[1.1.1]pentanes are best synthesized from the corresponding propellanes.

The bicyclo[1.1.1]pentane structure has been used as an unusual bioisostere for a phenyl ring.

== See also ==
- Housane
- Staffane
- Zemprocitinib − drug with a bicyclo[1.1.1]pentane ring system
