= 2.2.2-Propellane =

Chemical compound

[2.2.2]Propellane

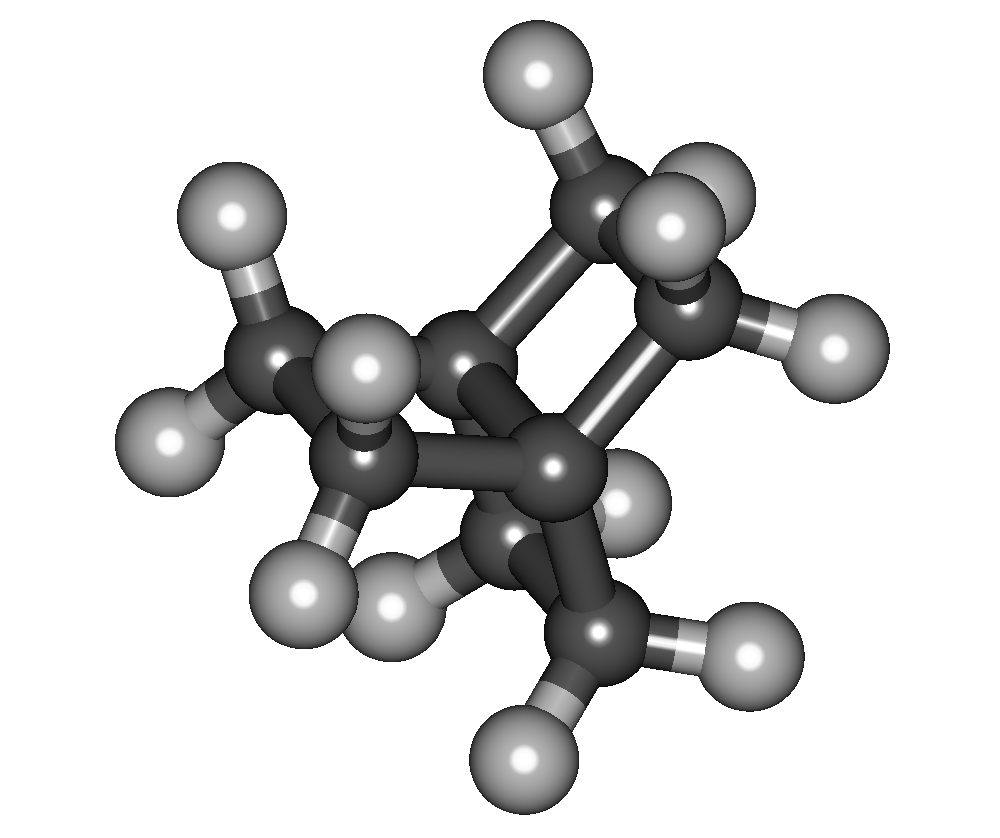

Names
- Preferred IUPAC name Tricyclo[2.2.2.0^{1,4}]octane

Identifiers
| CAS Number | 36120-88-4 |
| 3D model (JSmol) | Interactive image |
| ChemSpider | 490864 |
| PubChem CID | 564666 |
| UNII | N79VJK4GSD |
| CompTox Dashboard (EPA) | DTXSID10340429 |
- InChI: InChI=1S/C8H12/c1-2-8-5-3-7(1,8)4-6-8/h1-6H2 Key: GPMHXZWOEIWUPW-UHFFFAOYSA-N; InChI=1/C8H12/c1-2-8-5-3-7(1,8)4-6-8/h1-6H2 Key: GPMHXZWOEIWUPW-UHFFFAOYAI
- SMILES: C1C23C(CC2)(CC3)C1

Properties
| Chemical formula | C_{8}H_{12} |
| Molar mass | 108.184 g·mol^{−1} |
- Except where otherwise noted, data are given for materials in their standard state (at 25 °C [77 °F], 100 kPa). verify (what is ?) Infobox references

[2.2.2]Propellane, formally tricyclo[2.2.2.0^{1,4}]octane is an organic compound, a member of the propellane family. It is a hydrocarbon with formula C_{8}H_{12}, or C_{2}(C_{2}H_{4})_{3}. Its molecule has three rings with four carbon atoms each, sharing one C–C bond.

This compound is unstable (although not as much as [1.1.1]propellane; however it is less persistent than [1.1.1]propellane). The bond angles on the shared carbons are considerably strained: three of them are close to 90°, the other three to 120°. The strain energy is estimated to be 93 kcal/mol (390 kJ/mol).

== Synthesis ==
[2.2.2]Propellane was first synthesized in 1973 by the group of Philip Eaton (who had earlier obtained cubane), according to the following scheme:

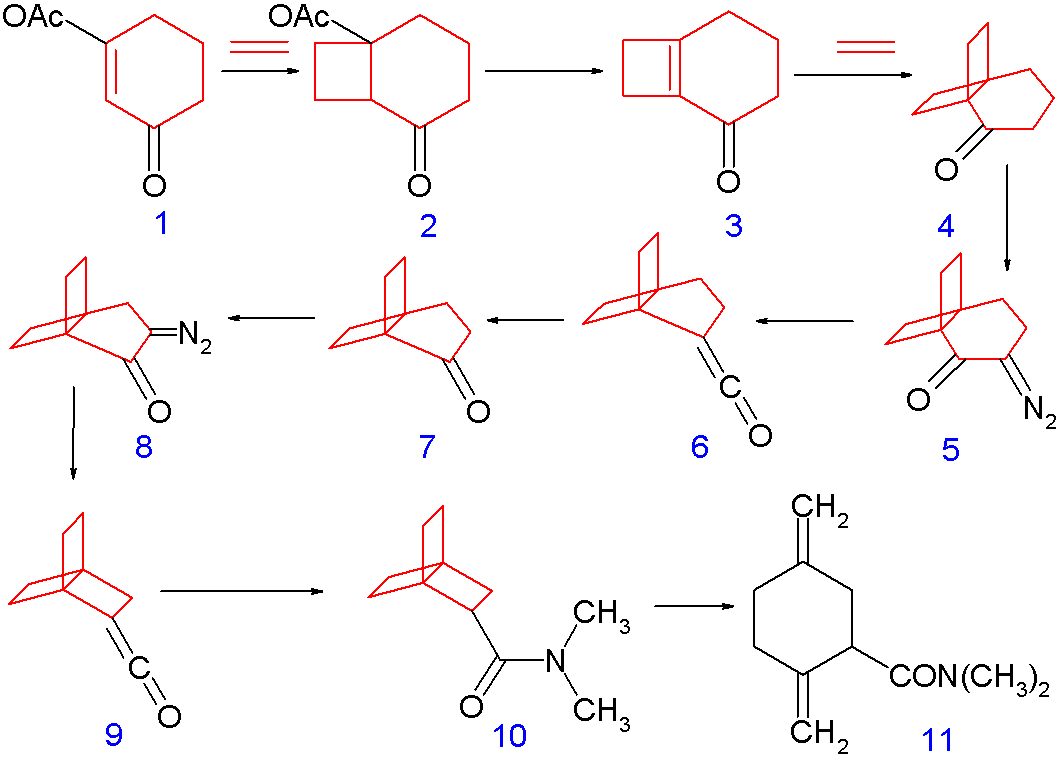
Synthesis of the [2.2.2]propellane skeleton.

The synthesis begins with photochemical [2+2]cycloaddition of ethene on the cyclohexene derivative 1 to produce the bicyclic compound 2, followed by elimination reaction with potassium t-butoxide of acetic acid to cyclobutene 3, followed by another cycloaddition with ethylene to 4. This compound is converted to the diazo ketone 5 by deprotonation (using acetic acid and sodium methoxide) and reaction with tosyl azide. The ketone then undergoes Wolff rearrangement to ketene 6. Ozonolysis forms the ketone 7, another diazotation yields the diazo ketone 8, which undergoes Wolff rearrangement again to the ketene 9. Reaction with dimethylamine affords the [2.2.2]propellane backbone with a dimethylamide substituent 10.

The final product 10 was found to spontaneously isomerize in solution to the monocyclic amide 11, with a half-life of 28 minutes at room temperature.

== See also ==
- [1.1.1]Propellane
- Triptycene
