= Staffane =

Polycyclic hydrocarbon

[n]staffane

A staffane or [n]staffane is an organic compound, a polycyclic hydrocarbon with molecular structure H-[-C≡(-CH_{2}-)_{3}≡C-]_{n}-H, for some integer n ≥ 1. The chemical formula is therefore C_{5n}H_{6n+2}

Staffanes were first obtained in 1988 by Piotr Kaszyński and Josef Michl, by spontaneous polymerization of [1.1.1]-propellane C_{5}H_{6} or C_{2}(=CH_{2})_{3}. In the reaction, the axial C-C bond of the propellane (the "bridge") is broken, creating a free bond on each of the two axial carbons (the "bridgeheads"). The resulting structural unit [-C≡(-CH_{2}-)_{3}≡C-] is a rigid cage, consisting of two carbon atoms joined by three methylene bridges; therefore the joined units are constrained to lie on a straight line. This feature has generated substantial interest among nanotechnology researchers, who have considered staffane oligomers as convenient "rigid rods" for building all sorts of nanostructures.

An oligomer with a specific number n of units is named [n]staffane (e.g., [1]staffane is bicyclo[1.1.1]pentane, [2]staffane, etc.) The notation [n]staffane is used when the number of units is variable or unspecified; in this case the "n" in the brackets is not a variable, but the letter "n" iself, and therefore considered part of the name.
