= Tetrahedral molecular geometry =

Central atom with four substituents located at the corners of a tetrahedron

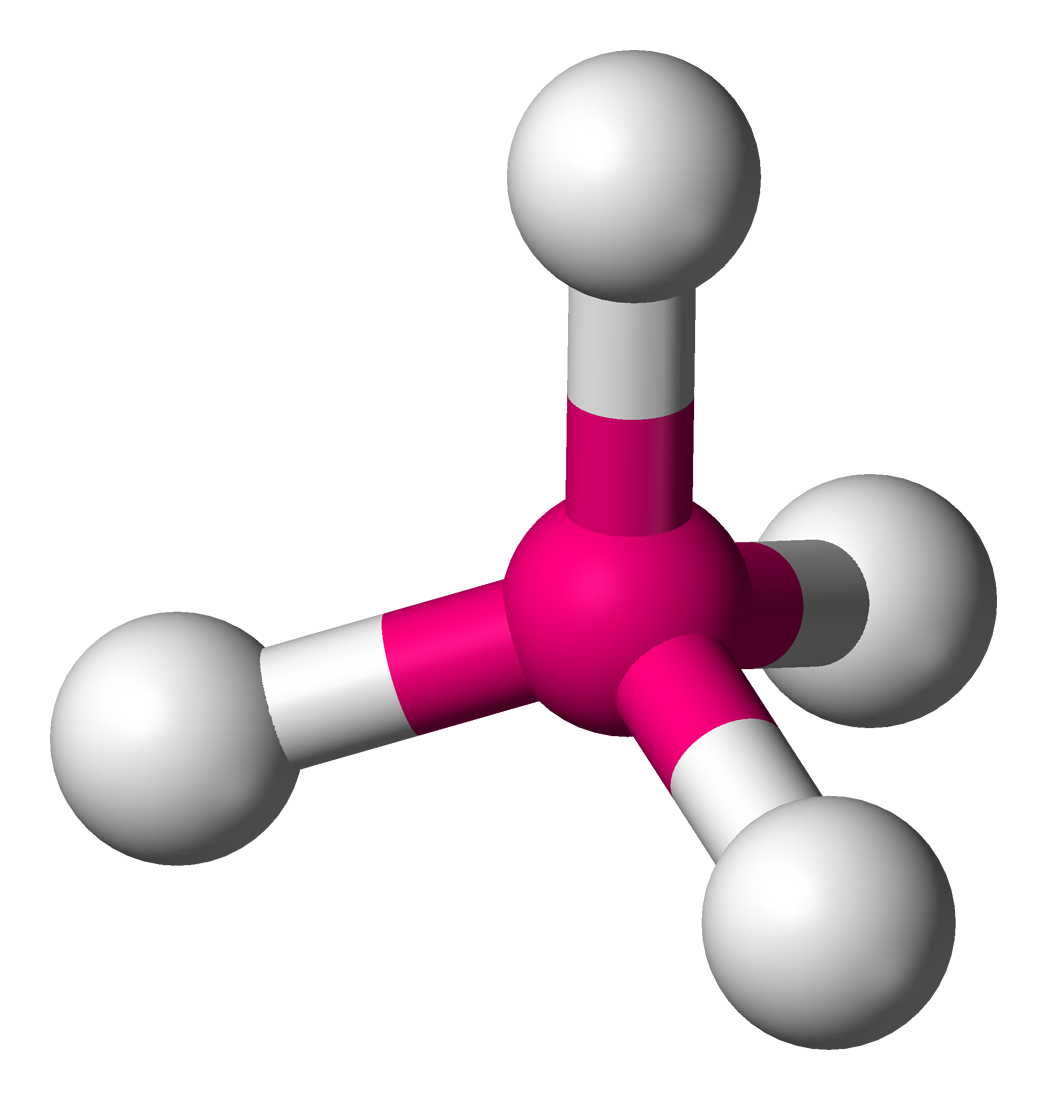
- Examples: CH_{4}, MnO^{−}_{4}
- Point group: T_{d}
- Coordination number: 4
- Bond angle(s): ≈ 109.5°
- μ (Polarity): 0

In a tetrahedral molecular geometry, a central atom is located at the center with four substituents that are located at the corners of a tetrahedron. The bond angles are arccos(−1/3) = 109.4712206...° ≈ 109.5° when all four substituents are the same, as in methane (CH_{4}) as well as its heavier analogues. Methane and other perfectly symmetrical tetrahedral molecules belong to point group T_{d}, but most tetrahedral molecules have lower symmetry. Tetrahedral molecules can be chiral.

== Tetrahedral bond angle ==
Computation with the Pythagorean theorem and trigonometry

Calculating bond angles of a symmetrical tetrahedral molecule using a dot product

The bond angle for a symmetric tetrahedral molecule such as CH_{4} may be calculated using the dot product of two vectors. As shown in the diagram at left, the molecule can be inscribed in a cube with the tetravalent atom (e.g. carbon) at the cube centre which is the origin of coordinates, O. The four monovalent atoms (e.g. hydrogens) are at four corners of the cube (A, B, C, D) chosen so that no two atoms are at adjacent corners linked by only one cube edge.

If the edge length of the cube is chosen as 2 units, then the two bonds OA and OB correspond to the vectors a = (1, –1, 1) and b = (1, 1, –1), and the bond angle θ is the angle between these two vectors. This angle may be calculated from the dot product of the two vectors, defined as a ⋅ b = ‖a‖ ‖b‖ cos θ where ‖a‖ denotes the length of vector a. As shown in the diagram, the dot product here is –1 and the length of each vector is √3, so that cos θ = –1/3 and the tetrahedral bond angle θ = arccos(–1/3) ≃ 109.47°.

An alternative proof using trigonometry is shown in the diagram at right.

== Examples ==
=== Main group chemistry ===
The tetrahedral molecule methane (CH_{4})

Aside from virtually all saturated organic compounds, most compounds of Si, Ge, and Sn are tetrahedral. Often tetrahedral molecules feature multiple bonding to the outer ligands, as in xenon tetroxide (XeO_{4}), the perchlorate ion (ClO^{−}_{4}), the sulfate ion (SO^{2−}_{4}), the phosphate ion (PO^{3−}_{4}). Thiazyl trifluoride (SNF_{3}) is tetrahedral, featuring a sulfur-to-nitrogen triple bond.

Other molecules have a tetrahedral arrangement of electron pairs around a central atom; for example ammonia (NH_{3}) with the nitrogen atom surrounded by three hydrogens and one lone pair. However the usual classification considers only the bonded atoms and not the lone pair, so that ammonia is actually considered as pyramidal. The H–N–H angles are 107°, contracted from 109.5°. This difference is attributed to the influence of the lone pair which gives a greater repulsive influence than a bonded atom.

=== Transition metal chemistry ===
Again the geometry is widespread, particularly so for complexes where the metal has d^{0} or d^{10} configuration. Illustrative examples include tetrakis(triphenylphosphine)palladium(0) (Pd[P(C_{6}H_{5})_{3}]_{4}), nickel carbonyl (Ni(CO)_{4}), and titanium tetrachloride (TiCl_{4}). Many complexes with incompletely filled d-shells are often tetrahedral, e.g. the tetrahalides of iron(II), cobalt(II), and nickel(II).

=== Water structure ===
In the gas phase, a single water molecule has an oxygen atom surrounded by two hydrogens and two lone pairs, and the H_{2}O geometry is simply described as bent without considering the nonbonding lone pairs.

However, in liquid water or in ice, the lone pairs form hydrogen bonds with neighboring water molecules. The most common arrangement of hydrogen atoms around an oxygen is tetrahedral with two hydrogen atoms covalently bonded to oxygen and two attached by hydrogen bonds. Since the hydrogen bonds vary in length many of these water molecules are not symmetrical and form transient irregular tetrahedra between their four associated hydrogen atoms.

== Bitetrahedral structures ==
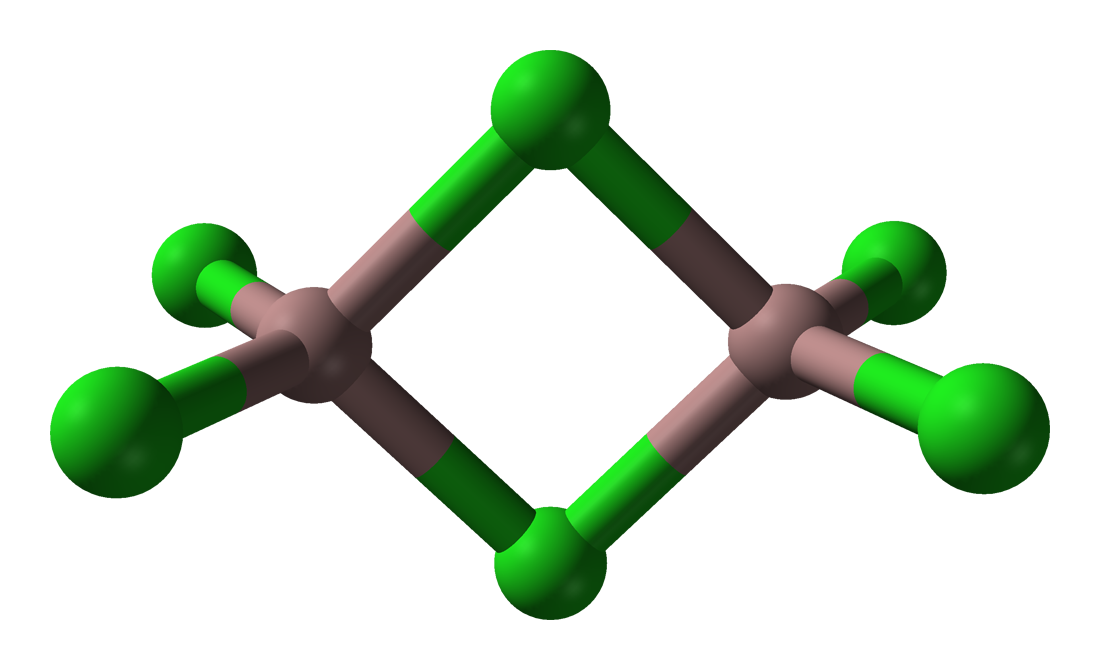
Bitetrahedral structure adopted by Al_{2}Br_{6} ("aluminium tribromide") and Ga_{2}Cl_{6} ("gallium trichloride")

Many compounds and complexes adopt bitetrahedral structures. In this motif, the two tetrahedra share a common edge. The inorganic polymer silicon disulfide features an infinite chain of edge-shared tetrahedra.

== Exceptions and distortions ==
Inversion of tetrahedra occurs widely in organic and main group chemistry. The Walden inversion illustrates the stereochemical consequences of inversion at carbon. Nitrogen inversion in ammonia also entails transient formation of planar NH_{3}.

=== Inverted tetrahedral geometry ===
Geometrical constraints in a molecule can cause a severe distortion of idealized tetrahedral geometry. In compounds featuring "inverted" tetrahedral geometry at a carbon atom, all four groups attached to this carbon are on one side of a plane. The carbon atom lies at or near the apex of a square pyramid with the other four groups at the corners.

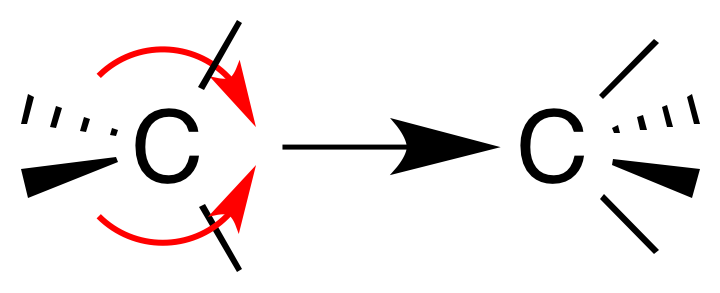

The simplest examples of organic molecules displaying inverted tetrahedral geometry are the smallest propellanes, such as [1.1.1]propellane; or more generally the paddlanes, and pyramidane ([3.3.3.3]fenestrane). Such molecules are typically strained, resulting in increased reactivity.

=== Planarization ===
A tetrahedron can also be distorted by increasing the angle between two of the bonds. In the extreme case, flattening results. For carbon this phenomenon can be observed in a class of compounds called the fenestranes.

=== Tetrahedral molecules with no central atom ===
A few molecules have a tetrahedral geometry with no central atom. An inorganic example is tetraphosphorus (P_{4}) which has four phosphorus atoms at the vertices of a tetrahedron and each bonded to the other three. An organic example is tetrahedrane (C_{4}H_{4}) with four carbon atoms each bonded to one hydrogen and the other three carbons. In this case the theoretical C−C−C bond angle is just 60° (in practice the angle will be larger due to bent bonds), representing a large degree of strain.

== See also ==
- AXE method
- Orbital hybridisation
