= Acepentalene =

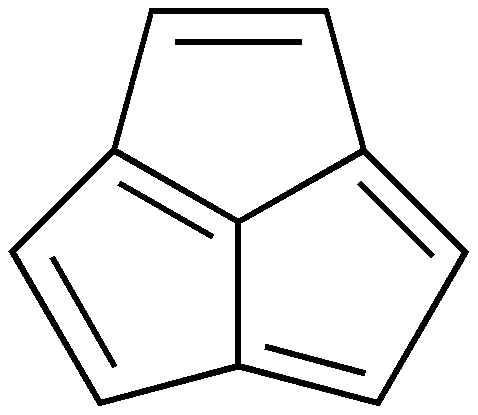

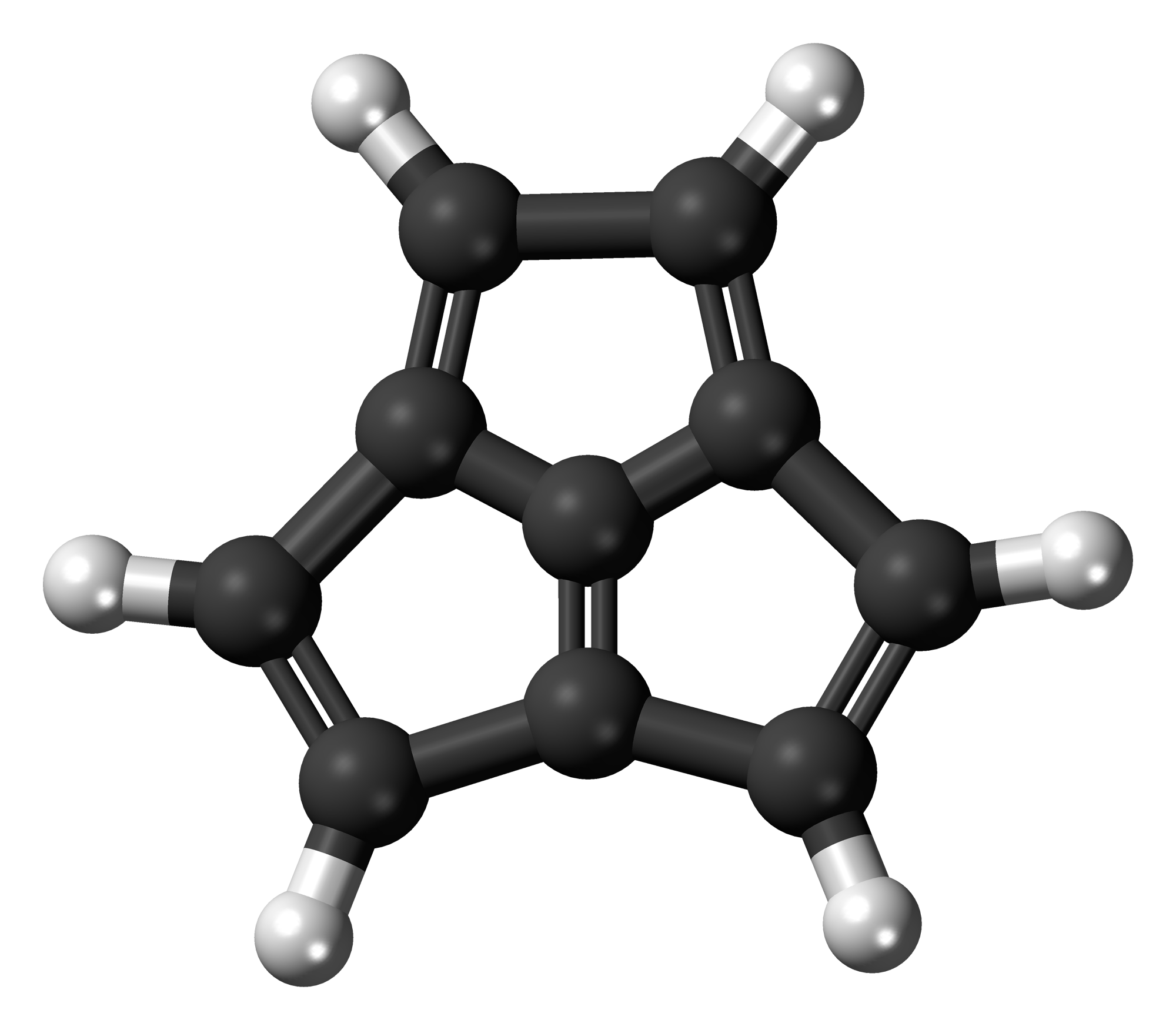

Names
- Preferred IUPAC name Cyclopenta[cd]pentalene
- Other names Acepentylene

Identifiers
CAS Number	187-68-8
3D model (JSmol)	Interactive image; Interactive image
ChemSpider	21477342
PubChem CID	13484333
CompTox Dashboard (EPA)	DTXSID20541925
- InChI: InChI=1S/C10H6/c1-2-8-5-6-9-4-3-7(1)10(8)9/h1-6H Key: CUIAUPQXSDOJAG-UHFFFAOYSA-N; InChI=1/C10H6/c1-2-8-5-6-9-4-3-7(1)10(8)9/h1-6H Key: CUIAUPQXSDOJAG-UHFFFAOYAJ
- SMILES: C2(C=C3)=C1C3=CC=C1C=C2; C1=CC2=CC=C3C2=C1C=C3

Properties
Chemical formula	C_{10}H_{6}
Molar mass	126.158 g·mol^{−1}
- Except where otherwise noted, data are given for materials in their standard state (at 25 °C [77 °F], 100 kPa). verify (what is ?) Infobox references

Acepentalene is a tricyclic anti-aromatic compound. Its molecular formula is C_{10}H_{6}. It consists of three five-membered rings fused across three of the five carbon atoms. The central carbon atom in acepentalene is part of all three rings. There are formally five double bonds in acepentalene, so that the molecule formally contains four double bonds on the exterior, and one double bond from the central carbon to the exterior of the ring system.

The acepentalene dianion, which can be stabilized by two lithium atoms, is aromatic. The radical anion is also known.

The dianion was first synthesized by reacting triquinacene with n-butyllithium and potassium tert-amylate (also called potassium t-pentoxide) in hexane solution.
