= Zemprocitinib =

Clinical data
- Other names: EQ-121; LNK-01001; LNK-207

Legal status
- Legal status: investigational

Identifiers
- IUPAC name: N-[3-(3,5,8,10-tetrazatricyclo[7.3.0.0^{2,6}]dodeca-1,4,6,8,11-pentaen-3-yl)-1-bicyclo[1.1.1]pentanyl]propane-1-sulfonamide
- CAS Number: 2417414-44-7
- PubChem CID: 152231544
- IUPHAR/BPS: 13221
- DrugBank: DB21719
- ChemSpider: 129380266
- UNII: LG6MM3RP86
- ChEBI: CHEBI:759957
- ChEMBL: ChEMBL6068039

Chemical and physical data
- Formula: C_{16}H_{19}N_{5}O_{2}S
- Molar mass: 345.42 g·mol^{−1}
- 3D model (JSmol): Interactive image
- SMILES: CCCS(=O)(=O)NC12CC(C1)(C2)N3C=NC4=CN=C5C(=C43)C=CN5
- InChI: InChI=InChI=1S/C16H19N5O2S/c1-2-5-24(22,23)20-15-7-16(8-15,9-15)21-10-19-12-6-18-14-11(13(12)21)3-4-17-14/h3-4,6,10,20H,2,5,7-9H2,1H3,(H,17,18); Key:WBKCMWRKRQABQF-UHFFFAOYSA-N

Zemprocitinib is an investigational new drug that is be evaluated by Lynk Pharmaceuticals for the treatment of ankylosing spondylitis and rheumatoid arthritis. It is an janus kinase 1 (JAK1) inhibitor.

== Clinical trials ==
It is currently being evaluated in a phase 3 trials trial for the treatment of rheumatoid Arthritis.
