= Octafluorocyclobutane =

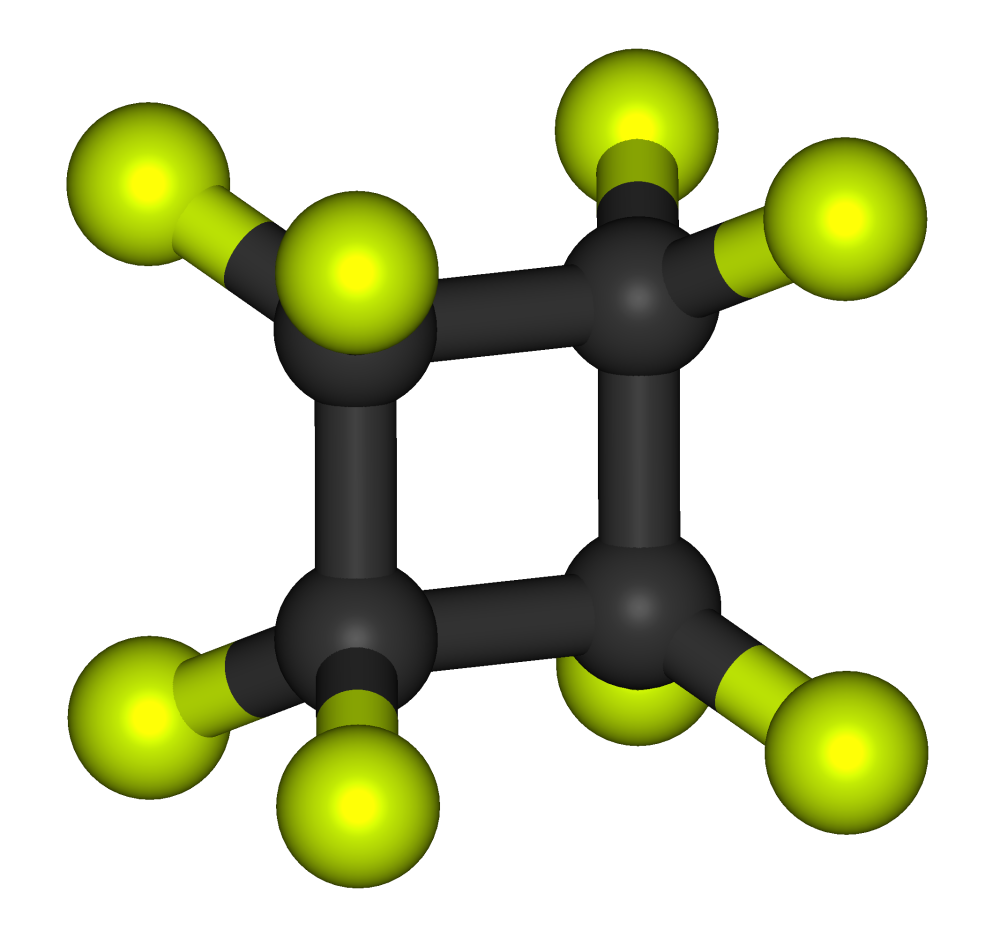

Names
- Preferred IUPAC name Octafluorocyclobutane
- Other names Freon-C-318, perfluorocyclobutane

Identifiers
CAS Number	115-25-3
3D model (JSmol)	Interactive image
Beilstein Reference	1909266
ChEBI	CHEBI:31007
ChEMBL	ChEMBL444147
ChemSpider	13846040
ECHA InfoCard	100.003.705
EC Number	204-075-2
E number	E946 (glazing agents, ...)
Gmelin Reference	131113
PubChem CID	8263
UNII	V9P1D0A21K
CompTox Dashboard (EPA)	DTXSID9041811
- InChI: InChI=1S/C4F8/c5-1(6)2(7,8)4(11,12)3(1,9)10 Key: BCCOBQSFUDVTJQ-UHFFFAOYSA-N; InChI=1/C4F8/c5-1(6)2(7,8)4(11,12)3(1,9)10 Key: BCCOBQSFUDVTJQ-UHFFFAOYAW
- SMILES: C1(C(C(C1(F)F)(F)F)(F)F)(F)F

Properties
Chemical formula	C_{4}F_{8}
Molar mass	200.03 g/mol
Appearance	colourless gas
Density	1.637 g/cm^{3} at −5.8 °C (liquid) 9.97 kg/m^{3} at −6 °C and 1 atm (gas); 8.82 kg/m^{3} 15 °C and 1 atm (gas)
Melting point	−40.1 °C (−40.2 °F; 233.1 K)
Boiling point	−5.8 °C (21.6 °F; 267.3 K)
Solubility in water	0.016 vol/vol (1.013 bar and 20 °C)
Viscosity	109e-6 Poise (1.013 bar and 0 °C)

Hazards
- GHS labelling
Pictograms	(GHS09: Environmental hazard)
Signal word	Warning
Hazard statements	H411
Precautionary statements	P273, P391, P410+P403, P501
- Except where otherwise noted, data are given for materials in their standard state (at 25 °C [77 °F], 100 kPa). verify (what is ?) Infobox references

Octafluorocyclobutane, or perfluorocyclobutane, C_{4}F_{8}, is an organofluorine compound which enjoys several niche applications. Octafluorocyclobutane is a colourless gas and shipped as a liquefied gas. It is the perfluorinated analogue of cyclobutane whereby all C–H bonds are replaced with C–F bonds.

== Production ==
Octafluorocyclobutane is produced by the dimerization of tetrafluoroethylene and the reductive coupling of 1,2-dichloro-1,1,2,2-tetrafluoroethane.

== Properties ==
The critical point of octafluorocyclobutane is at 115.3 °C and 2.79 MPa.

== Applications ==
In the production of semiconductor materials and devices, octafluorocyclobutane serves mainly as a passivation layer material in etching processes. Sometimes it is used as an etchant. It has also been investigated as a refrigerant in specialised applications, as a replacement for ozone depleting chlorofluorocarbon refrigerants. Exploiting its volatility and chemical inertness, octafluorocyclobutane may be found in some aerosolized foods. It is listed by the Codex Alimentarius under number 946 (E946 for EU). It is investigated as a possible replacement for sulfur hexafluoride as a dielectric gas.

== Gallery ==
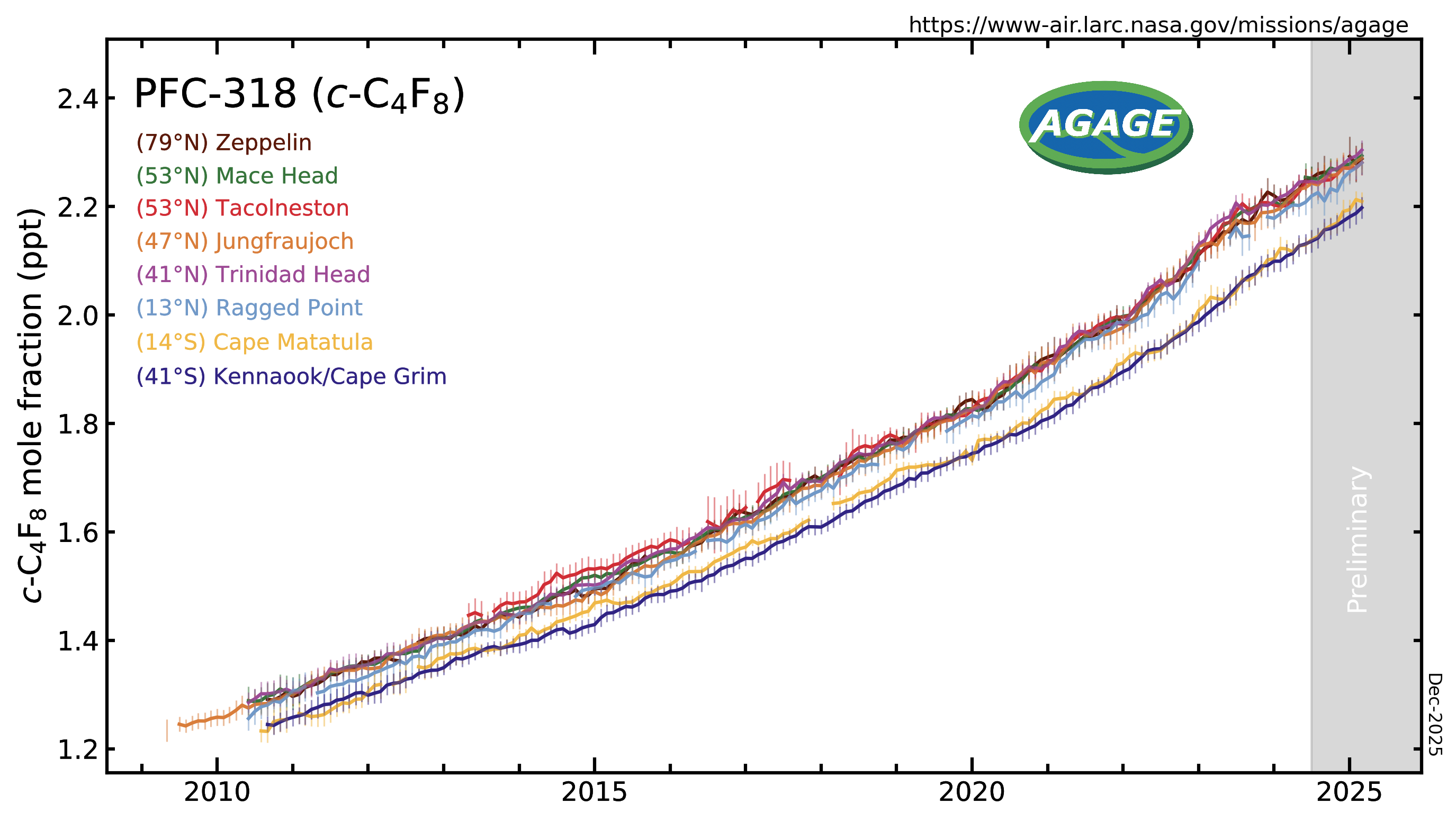
PFC-318 measured by the Advanced Global Atmospheric Gases Experiment (AGAGE) in the lower atmosphere (troposphere) at stations around the world. Abundances are given as pollution free monthly mean mole fractions in parts-per-trillion.

== See also ==
- Octachlorocyclobutane
