= 1-Pentyne =

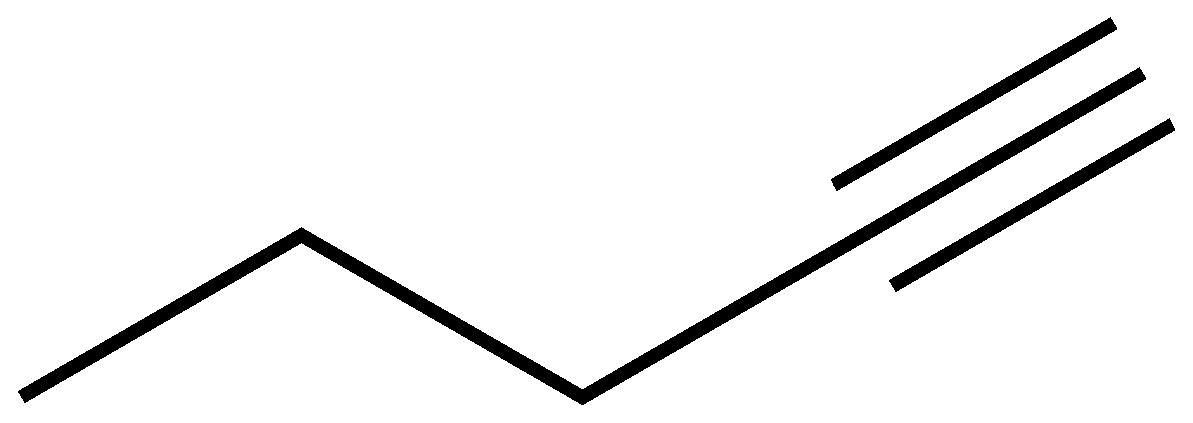
- Skeletal formula of 1-pentyne

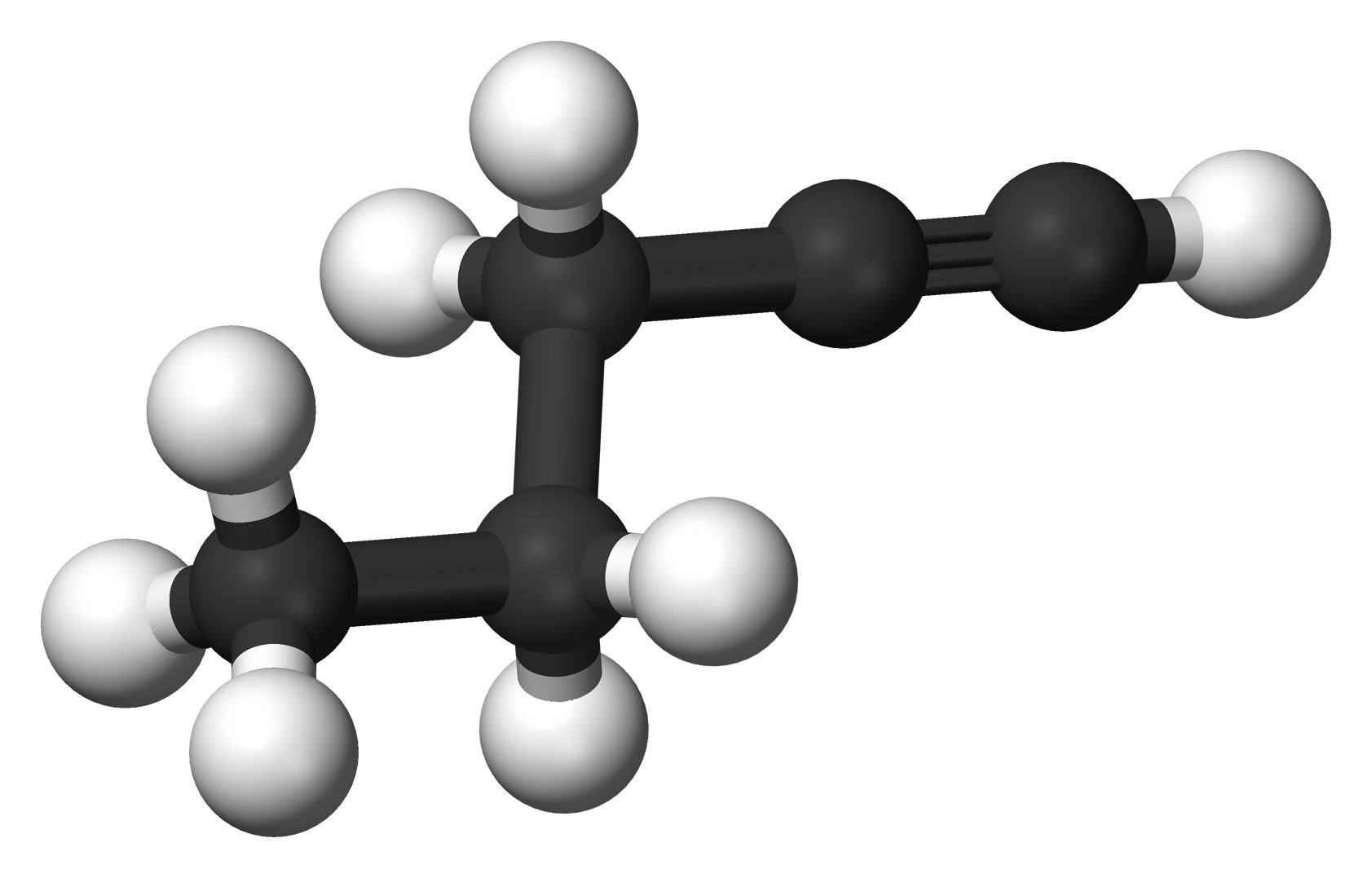
- Ball-and-stick model of 1-pentyne

Names
- Preferred IUPAC name Pent-1-yne
- Other names Propylacetylene

Identifiers
CAS Number	627-19-0
3D model (JSmol)	Interactive image
ChEMBL	ChEMBL16262
ChemSpider	11806
ECHA InfoCard	100.009.989
PubChem CID	12309
UNII	EW8XD8E5WF
CompTox Dashboard (EPA)	DTXSID7060835
- InChI: InChI=1S/C5H8/c1-3-5-4-2/h1H,4-5H2,2H3 Key: IBXNCJKFFQIKKY-UHFFFAOYSA-N; InChI=1/C5H8/c1-3-5-4-2/h1H,4-5H2,2H3 Key: IBXNCJKFFQIKKY-UHFFFAOYAX
- SMILES: C#CCCC

Properties
Chemical formula	C_{5}H_{8}
Molar mass	68.12
Appearance	colorless liquid
Density	0.691 g/mL
Melting point	−106 to −105 °C
Boiling point	40.2 °C (104.4 °F; 313.3 K)
Solubility in water	Insoluble

Hazards
- Occupational safety and health (OHS/OSH)
Main hazards	Flammable Liquid
Flash point	−20 °C (−4 °F; 253 K)
- Except where otherwise noted, data are given for materials in their standard state (at 25 °C [77 °F], 100 kPa). verify (what is ?) Infobox references

1-Pentyne is an organic compound with the formula CH_{3}CH_{2}CH_{2}C≡CH. It is a terminal alkyne, in fact the smallest that is liquid at room temperature. The compound is a common terminal alkyne substrate in diverse studies of catalysis.

== See also ==
- 2-Pentyne, an isomer
