= Kenneth B. Wiberg =

American chemist (1927–2026)

Kenneth Berle Wiberg (September 22, 1927 – May 10, 2026) was an American chemist and academic who was Professor Emeritus of organic chemistry at Yale University. He contributed to many aspects of organic chemistry including physical and synthetic aspects.

== Scholarship ==
In the area of synthetic organic chemistry, Wiberg and his students reported the preparation of highly strained organic compounds bicyclobutane and [1.1.1]propellane:

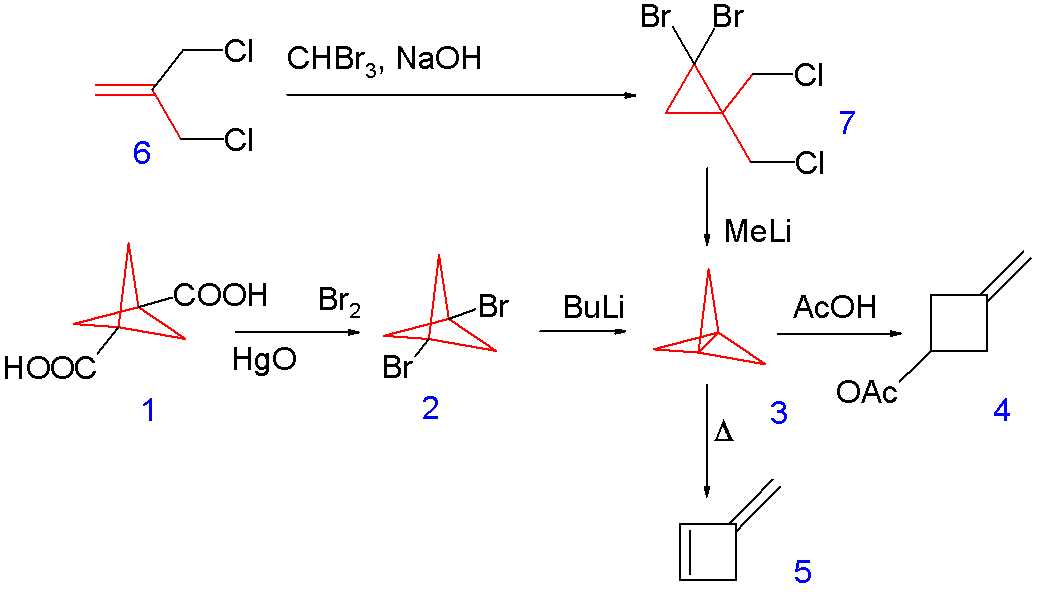
Scheme 1. Synthesis of [1.1.1]propellane

== Death ==
Wiberg died in Needham, Massachusetts, on May 10, 2026, at the age of 98.

== Recognition ==
- Wiberg was a member of the National Academy of Sciences and the American Academy of Arts and Sciences and an American Association of Arts and Sciences fellow.
- In 1988, he won the Arthur C. Cope Award.
- Asteroid 27267 Wiberg, discovered by American astronomer John V. McClusky at Fair Oaks Ranch Observatory (725) in 1999, was named in his honor. The official naming citation was published by the Minor Planet Center on 7 January 2004 (M.P.C. 50464).
