= Strain energy =

Elastic potential energy gained by a material under tensile or compressive stress

In physics, the elastic potential energy gained by a wire during elongation with a tensile (stretching) or compressive (contractile) force is called strain energy. For linearly elastic materials, strain energy is:

$$U = \frac 1 2 V \sigma \varepsilon = \frac 1 2 V E \varepsilon^2 = \frac 1 2 \frac V E \sigma^2$$

where σ is stress, ε is strain, V is volume, and E is Young's modulus:

$$E = \frac \sigma \varepsilon$$

== Molecular strain ==
In a molecule, strain energy is released when the constituent atoms are allowed to rearrange themselves in a chemical reaction. The external work done on an elastic member in causing it to distort from its unstressed state is transformed into strain energy which is a form of potential energy. The strain energy in the form of elastic deformation is mostly recoverable in the form of mechanical work.

For example, the heat of combustion of cyclopropane (696 kJ/mol) is higher than that of propane (657 kJ/mol) for each additional CH_{2} unit. Compounds with unusually large strain energy include tetrahedranes, propellanes, cubane-type clusters, fenestranes and cyclophanes.
