= 2-Pentyne =

Chemical compound (CH3CH2C≡CCH3)

- Skeletal formula of 2-pentyne

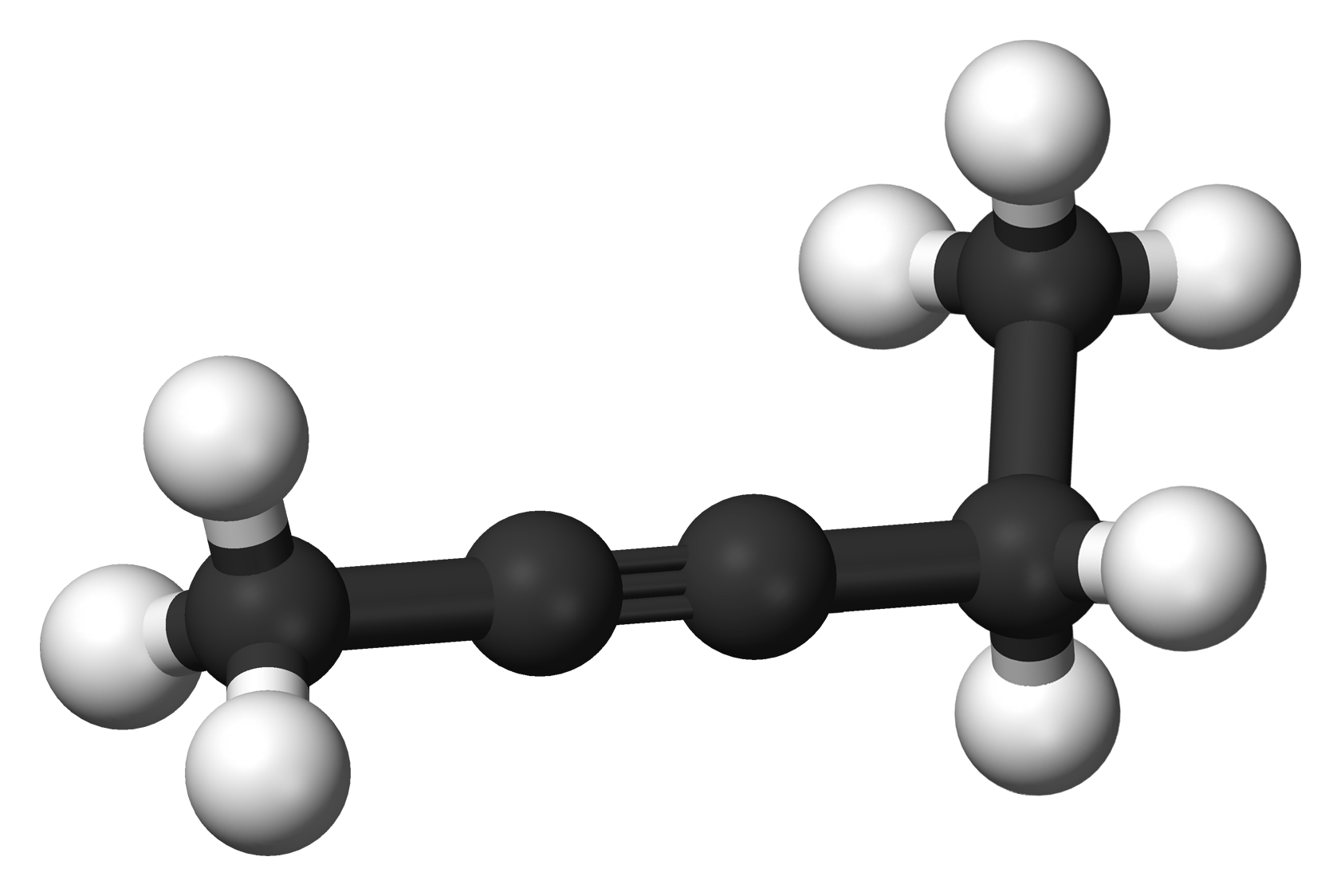
- Ball-and-stick model of 2-pentyne

Names
- Preferred IUPAC name Pent-2-yne
- Other names Ethylmethylacetylene, 1-Ethyl-2-methylacetylene propyl acetylene

Identifiers
CAS Number	627-21-4
3D model (JSmol)	Interactive image; Interactive image
ChemSpider	11807
ECHA InfoCard	100.009.991
PubChem CID	12310
UNII	57NG6HKI9D
CompTox Dashboard (EPA)	DTXSID80211758
- InChI: InChI=1S/C5H8/c1-3-5-4-2/h3H2,1-2H3 Key: NKTDTMONXHODTI-UHFFFAOYSA-N; InChI=1/C5H8/c1-3-5-4-2/h3H2,1-2H3
- SMILES: CC#CCC; C(#CCC)C

Properties
Chemical formula	C_{5}H_{8}
Molar mass	68.12
Density	0.71 g/mL
Melting point	−109 °C (−164 °F; 164 K)
Boiling point	56 to 57 °C

Hazards
- Occupational safety and health (OHS/OSH)
Main hazards	Flammable Liquid
- Except where otherwise noted, data are given for materials in their standard state (at 25 °C [77 °F], 100 kPa). verify (what is ?) Infobox references

2-Pentyne, an organic compound with the formula CH_{3}CH_{2}C≡CCH_{3} and is an internal alkyne. It is an isomer of 1-pentyne, a terminal alkyne.

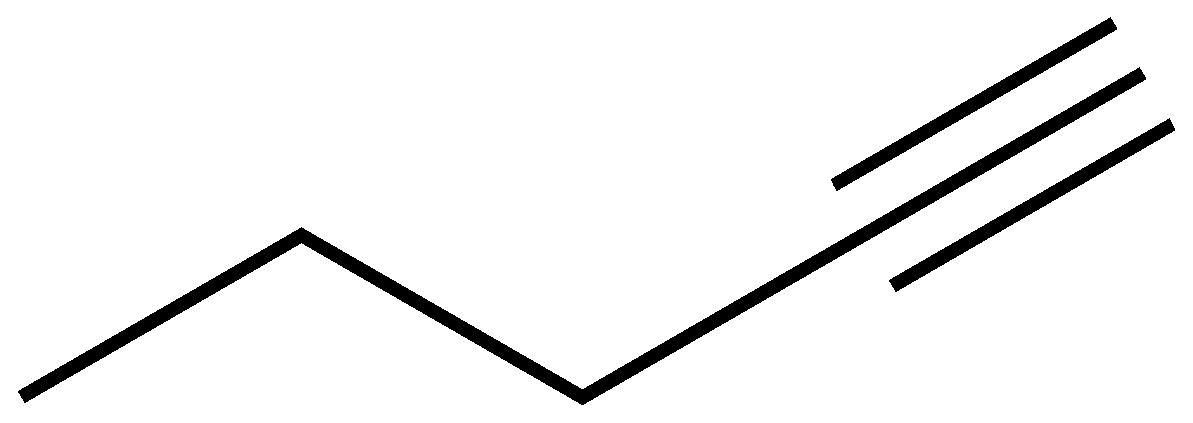
1-Pentyne

== Synthesis ==
2-Pentyne can be synthesized by the rearrangement 1-pentyne in a solution of ethanolic potassium hydroxide or NaNH2/NH3.
