= Cyclobutane =

Organic compound (CH2)4

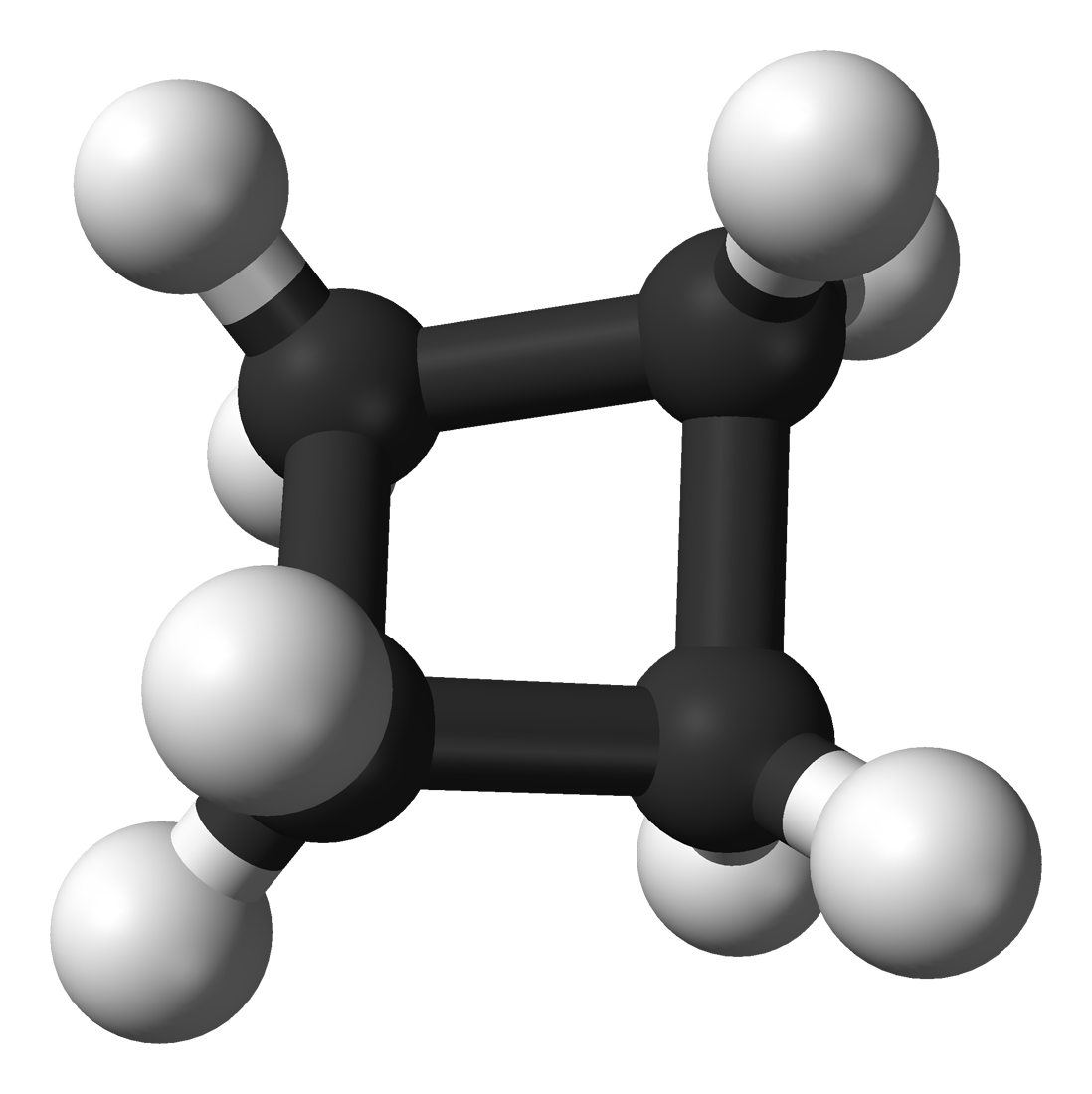
Cyclobutane
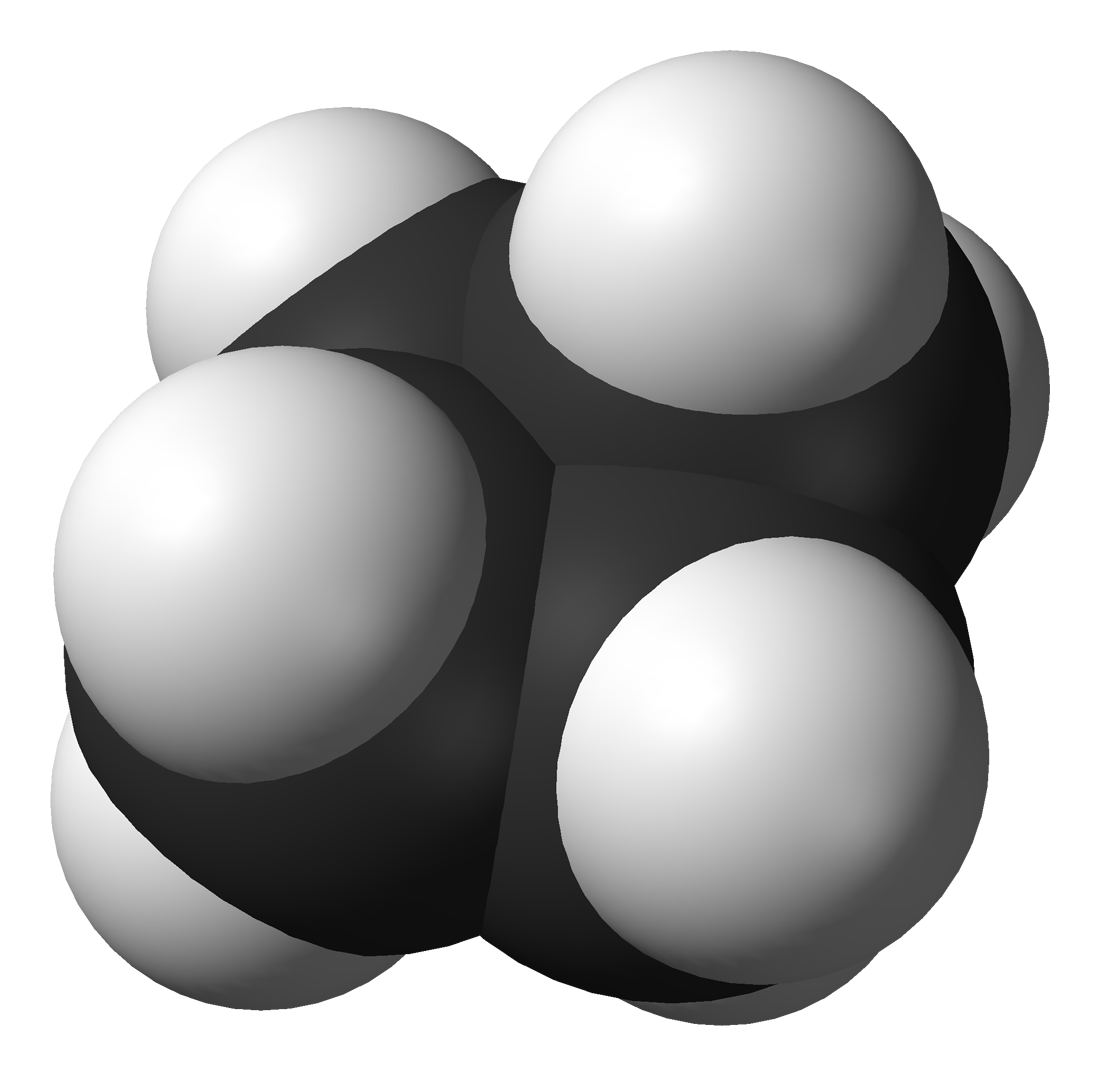
Cyclobutane

Names
- Preferred IUPAC name Cyclobutane
- Other names Ethene dimer Biethylene; Diethylene; Squarane

Identifiers
CAS Number	287-23-0
3D model (JSmol)	Interactive image
Beilstein Reference	1900183
ChEBI	CHEBI:30377
ChemSpider	8894
ECHA InfoCard	100.005.468
EC Number	206-014-5
Gmelin Reference	81684
PubChem CID	9250
UNII	5X619RB2CY
UN number	2601
CompTox Dashboard (EPA)	DTXSID2059772
- InChI: InChI=1S/C4H8/c1-2-4-3-1/h1-4H2 Key: PMPVIKIVABFJJI-UHFFFAOYSA-N; InChI=1/C4H8/c1-2-4-3-1/h1-4H2 Key: PMPVIKIVABFJJI-UHFFFAOYAP
- SMILES: C1CCC1

Properties
Chemical formula	C_{4}H_{8}
Molar mass	56.108 g·mol^{−1}
Appearance	Colorless gas
Density	0.720 g/cm^{3}
Melting point	−91 °C (−132 °F; 182 K)
Boiling point	12.5 °C (54.5 °F; 285.6 K)

Hazards
- GHS labelling
Pictograms	(GHS02: Flammable)
Signal word	Danger
Hazard statements	H220
Precautionary statements	P210, P377, P381, P403, P410+P403
NFPA 704 (fire diamond)	1 4 0

Related compounds
Related alkane	Butane
Related compounds	Cyclobutene; Cyclobutadiene; Cyclopropane; Cyclopentane
- Except where otherwise noted, data are given for materials in their standard state (at 25 °C [77 °F], 100 kPa). verify (what is ?) Infobox references

Cyclobutane is a cycloalkane and organic compound with the formula (CH_{2})_{4}. Cyclobutane is a colourless gas and is commercially available as a liquefied gas. Derivatives of cyclobutane are called cyclobutanes. Cyclobutane itself is of no commercial or biological significance, but more complex derivatives are important in biology and biotechnology.

== Structure ==
The bond angles between carbon atoms are significantly strained and as such have lower bond energies than related linear or unstrained hydrocarbons, e.g. butane or cyclohexane. As such, cyclobutane is unstable above about 500 °C.

The four carbon atoms in cyclobutane are not coplanar; instead, the ring typically adopts a folded or "puckered" conformation. This implies that the C-C-C angle is less than 90°. One of the carbon atoms makes a 25° angle with the plane formed by the other three carbons. In this way, some of the eclipsing interactions are reduced. The conformation is also known as a "butterfly". Equivalent puckered conformations interconvert:

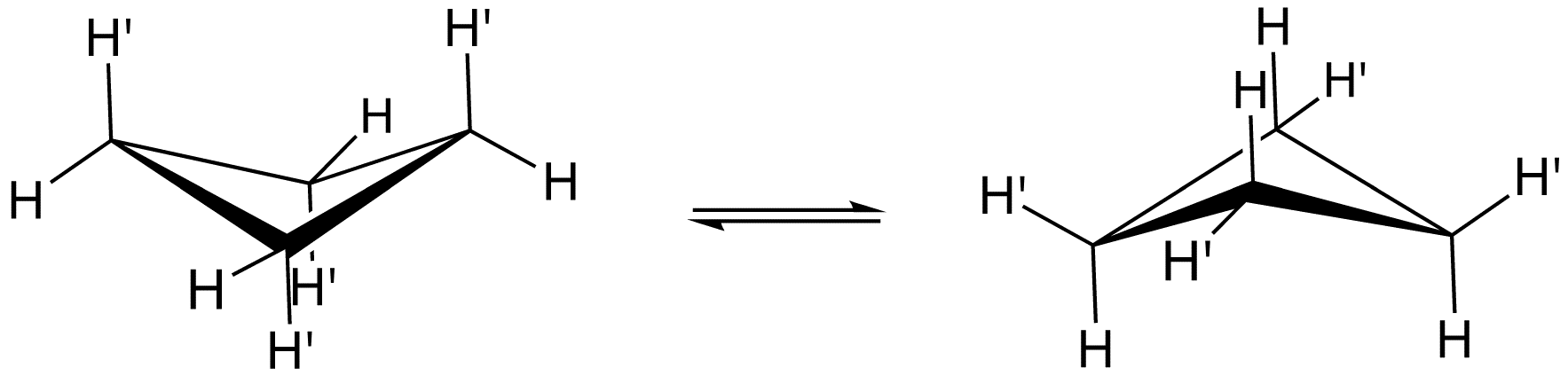

== Cyclobutanes in biology and biotechnology ==

Despite the inherent strain, the cyclobutane motif is indeed found in nature. One example is pentacycloanammoxic acid, which is a ladderane composed of 5 fused cyclobutane units. The estimated strain in this compound is 3 times that of cyclobutane. The compound is found in bacteria performing the anammox process where it forms part of a tight and very dense membrane believed to protect the organism from toxic hydroxylamine and hydrazine involved in the production of nitrogen and water from nitrite ions and ammonia. Some related fenestranes are also found in nature.

Cyclobutane photo dimers (CPD) are formed by photochemical reactions that result in the coupling of the C=C double bonds of pyrimidines. Thymine dimers (T-T dimers) formed in between two thymines are the most abundant of the CPDs. CPDs are readily repaired by nucleotide excision repair enzymes. In most organisms, they can also be repaired by photolyases, a light-dependent family of enzymes. Xeroderma pigmentosum is a genetic disease where this damage can not be repaired, resulting in skin discolouration and tumours induced by exposure to UV light.

Carboplatin is a popular anticancer drug that is derived from cyclobutane-1,1-dicarboxylic acid.

== Preparation ==
Many methods exist for the preparation of cyclobutanes. Alkenes dimerize upon irradiation with UV light, and, in the Norrish-Yang reaction, irradiated carbonyls cyclize to a cyclobutanol. Ketenes attack electron-rich alkenes to give cyclobutanones. 1,4-Dihalobutanes convert to cyclobutanes upon dehalogenation with reducing metals.

Cyclobutane was first synthesized in 1907 by James Bruce and Richard Willstätter by hydrogenating cyclobutene in the presence of nickel.

== See also ==
- Butane
- Octachlorocyclobutane
- Octafluorocyclobutane
