= List of chemical compounds with unusual names =

Chemical nomenclature, replete as it is with compounds with very complex names, is a repository for some names that may be considered unusual. A browse through the Physical Constants of Organic Compounds in the CRC Handbook of Chemistry and Physics (a fundamental resource) will reveal not just the whimsical work of chemists, but the sometimes peculiar compound names that occur as the consequence of simple juxtaposition. Some names derive legitimately from their chemical makeup, from the geographic region where they may be found, the plant or animal species from which they are isolated or the name of the discoverer.

Some are given intentionally unusual trivial names based on their structure, a notable property or at the whim of those who first isolate them. However, many trivial names predate formal naming conventions. Trivial names can also be ambiguous or carry different meanings in different industries, geographic regions and languages.

Godly noted that "Trivial names having the status of INN or ISO are carefully tailor-made for their field of use and are internationally accepted". In his preface to Chemical Nomenclature, Thurlow wrote that "Chemical names do not have to be deadly serious". A website in existence since 1997 and maintained at the University of Bristol lists a selection of "molecules with silly or unusual names" strictly for entertainment. These so-called silly or funny trivial names (depending on culture) can also serve an educational purpose. In an article in the Journal of Chemical Education, Dennis Ryan argues that students of organic nomenclature (considered a "dry and boring" subject) may actually take an interest in it when tasked with the job of converting funny-sounding chemical trivial names to their proper systematic names.

The collection listed below presents a sample of trivial names and gives an idea how chemists are inspired when they coin a brand new name for a chemical compound outside of systematic naming. It also includes some examples of systematic names and acronyms that accidentally resemble English words.

== Elements ==
Glenn Seaborg told his students that he proposed the chemical symbol Pu (from P U) instead of the conventional "Pl" for plutonium as a joke, only to find it officially adopted. Unununium (Uuu) was the former temporary name of the chemical element number 111, a synthetic transuranium element. This element was named roentgenium (Rg) in November 2004.

== Compounds ==
=== Name based on shape ===
Barrelene	Barrelene C_{8}H_{8}, the name derives from the resemblance to a barrel.
Basketane	Basketane pentacyclo[4.4.0.0^{2,5}.0^{3,8}.0^{4,7}]decane (C_{10}H_{12}), a polycyclic alkane with a structure similar to a basket.
Bowtiediene	Bowtiediene Spiropentadiene, a polycyclic alkene with a 2D projection similar to a bowtie.
Churchane	Churchane A polycyclic alkane named "churchane" because it looks superficially like a church.
Cubane	Cubane A hydrocarbon whose eight carbon atoms occupy the vertices of a cube.
Dodecahedrane	Dodecahedrane A Platonic hydrocarbon shaped like a dodecahedron.
Fenestrane (Windowpane)	Fenestranes A class of compounds with a structural formula that resembles a "window pane motif" (the name fenestrane derives from the Latin word fenestra, meaning window), comprising four fused carbocycles centred on a quaternary carbon resulting in a twice-over spiro compound. The illustration at right shows a generic fenestrane as well as the specific example [4,4,4,4]fenestrane. Fenestranes are of considerable interest in theoretical chemistry though comparatively few have actually been synthesised.
Housane	A polycyclic alkane named "housane" because it looks superficially like a house.
Ladderane	Pentacycloanammoxic Acid An organic molecule that looks like a ladder because it contains two or more fused rings of cyclobutane.
Nanokid	Nanokids belong to a series of NanoPutians, a series of organic molecules whose structural formula resemble human forms. "NanoPutian" is a portmanteau of nano-, a unit prefix meaning one billionth, and lilliputian, a fictional race of humans in the novel Gulliver's Travels by Jonathan Swift. There are no chemical or practical uses for the NanoKid molecule or any of its known derivatives.
Olympiadane	Olympiadane A mechanically-interlocked compound based on the topology for the Olympic rings.
Olympicene	Olympicene Refers to the fused 5-benzene rings (C_{19}H_{12}), which is reminiscent of the Olympic Flag.
Paddlanes	Paddlane Paddlanes are tricyclic molecules that resemble the paddles on steamboats.
Pagodane	An organic compound which resembles a pagoda.
Penguinone	Penguinone 3,4,4,5-tetramethylcyclohexa-2,5-dienone; a two-dimensional representation of its structure resembles a penguin.
Pterodactylane	Pterodactylane [4]-ladderanes with substituents on the central rung. So named for their resemblance to a Pterodactyl.
Prismane	Prismane A valence isomer of benzene with the carbon atoms arranged in the shape of a triangular prism.
Propellanes	[1.1.1]Propellane Propellanes are tricyclic molecules that resemble propellers.
Quadratic acid	Squaric acid A square-shaped organic compound, also called squaric acid.
Sulflower	Sulflower A stable heterocyclic octacirculene based on thiophene, named as a portmanteau of sulfur and sunflower.
Volleyballene	Molecule composed of 60 carbon and 20 scandium atoms, which has an appearance similar to that of a volleyball.

=== Named after people ===
Buckminsterfullerene (Fullerene)	Fullerene Also called the buckyball, this is an allotrope of carbon named after Richard Buckminster Fuller due to its resemblance to Fuller's geodesic domes. The term was coined by Harold Kroto. The alternative name footballene was coined by A.D.J. Haymet because the molecule also resembles a football; the 70-atom version is said to resemble a rugby ball from its own oval shape.
Bullvalene	Bullvalene C_{10}H_{10} (tricyclo[3.3.2.0^{2,8}]deca-3,6,9-triene) (C_{10}H_{10}), was named by organic chemist Maitland Jones Jr. for William "Bull" Doering who predicted its properties in 1963. Within a specific temperature range the molecule is subject to rapid degenerate Cope rearrangements with the result that all carbon atoms and hydrogen atoms are equivalent and that none of the carbon–carbon bonds is permanent.
Dickite	(Al_{2}Si_{2}O_{5}(OH)_{4}), a clay-like material with a number of manufacturing uses, one of which is as a coating for high-quality bond paper. It is named after its discoverer, Allan Brugh Dick.
Josiphos ligands	A well-known catalyst, named after Josi Puleo, the technician who first prepared it. Mandyphos and Taniaphos also exist.
Welshite	A mineral named after the US amateur mineralogist Wilfred R. Welsh. Its formula is Ca_{2}SbMg_{4}FeBe_{2}Si_{4}O_{20}.

=== Named after fictional characters ===
Alcindoromycine	An anthracycline antibiotic agent named after the character Alcindoro in La Bohème.
Bohemamine	An anti-tumour agent named after the Puccini opera La Bohème.
Collinemycin	An anthracycline antibiotic agent named after the character Colline in La Bohème.
Ranasmurfin	A blue protein from the foam nests of a tropical frog, named after The Smurfs.
Mimimycin	An anthracycline antibiotic agent named after the character Mimì in La Bohème.
Musettamycin	An anthracycline antibiotic agent named after the character Musetta in La Bohème.
Marcellomycin	An anthracycline antibiotic agent named after the character Marcello in La Bohème.
Pikachurin	A retinal protein named after Pokémon character / species Pikachu.
Rudolphomycin	An anthracycline antibiotic agent named after the character Rodolfo (Rudolph) in La Bohème.
Sonic hedgehog	A protein named after Sonic the Hedgehog.

=== Related to sex ===
Arsole	Arsole (C_{4}H_{5}As), an analogue of pyrrole in which an arsenic atom replaces the nitrogen atom. The aromaticity of arsoles has been debated for many years. The compound in which a benzene ring is fused to arsole — typically on the carbon atoms 3 and 4 — is known as benzarsole.
clitorin	(C_{33}H_{40}O_{19}), a natural plant-derived flavonol glycoside studied in scientific research for its antioxidant properties.
Cumene	Cumene (C_{9}H_{12}), an aromatic hydrocarbon used in the production of phenol and acetone.
Cummingtonite	((Mg,Fe^{2+})_{2}(Mg,Fe^{2+})_{5}Si_{8}O_{22}(OH)_{2}), a magnesium-iron silicate hydroxide, first identified in Cummington, Massachusetts.
FAP	Tris(pentafluoroethyl)trifluorophosphate, an anion used in some ionic liquids.
Fornacite	A rare lead, copper chromate arsenate hydroxide mineral (Pb_{2}CuCrO_{4}AsO_{4}OH), named after its discoverer, Lucien Lewis Forneau.
Fucitol	L-Fucitol (C_{6}H_{14}O_{5}), an alcohol derived from Fucus vesiculosus, a North Atlantic seaweed. Its optical isomers are also called D-fuc-ol and L-fuc-ol.
FucK	The name of the gene that encodes L-fuculokinase, an enzyme that catalyzes a chemical reaction between L-fuculose, ADP, and L-fuculose-1-phosphate.
Fukalite	(Ca_{4}Si_{2}O_{6}(CO_{3})(OH, F))_{2}, a rare form of calcium silicocarbonate discovered in the Fuka Mine of Takahashi, Japan.
Orotic acid	Orotic acid Pyrimidinecarboxylic acid has been referred to as vitamin B_{13}. Often misspelled "erotic acid".
Pizda	Pizda Abbreviated ligand name of a substance 1-(2’’-hydroxyl cyclohexyl)-3-[aminopropyl]-4-[3’-aminopropyl] piperazine, first synthesized by a group of Australian chemists. In Romanian and some Slavic languages, the word pizda is a vulgarism for "vulva" (see Reconstruction:Proto-Slavic/pizda).
Pregnane	A steroid that has a similar structure to Progesterone, a sex hormone found in pregnancy
Rhamnetin	Rhamnetin A flavonol dye derived from buckthorn (rhamnus).
SEX	SEX An abbreviation of sodium ethyl xanthate, a flotation agent used in the mining industry.
Spermine, Spermidine	Spermine Spermidine growth factors involved in cellular metabolism.

=== Related to bodily functions ===
BARF	BARF (tetrakis[3,5-bis(trifluoromethyl)phenyl]borate), a fluoroaryl borate B(Ar(CF_{3})_{2})_{4}^{−}, used as a non-coordinating anion
catP	The name of the enzyme responsible for chloramphenicol resistance in various species of bacteria.
Constipatic acid	Constipatic acid [2-(14-hydroxypentadecyl)-4-methyl-5-oxo-2,5-dihydrofuran-3-carboxylic acid], an aliphatic acid derived from the Australian Xanthoparmelia lichen.
Crapinon	An anticholinergic drug, one side effect of which is constipation.
Diurea	Methylene diurea Organic compounds containing two urea moieties. Specific examples include methylene diurea and ethylene diurea.
dUMP	dUMP Deoxyuridine monophosphate, an intermediate in nucleotide metabolism
Earthcide, or Fartox	Some of the many names for pentachloronitrobenzene, a fungicide.
Nonanal	Nonanal (C_{9}H_{18}O), an aldehyde derived from nonane. (Note: May also be considered to be related to sex.)
PoO	Chemical formula of polonium monoxide.
Uranate	The chemical term for an oxyanion of the element uranium.
Vomitoxin	Vomitoxin A mycotoxin occurring in grains.

=== Related to death and decay ===
Cadaverine	Cadaverine A foul-smelling diamine produced by putrefaction of dead animal tissue.
DEAD, DEADCAT	DEAD Diethyl azodicarboxylate: An apt acronym, given that diethyl azodicarboxylate is explosive, shock sensitive, carcinogenic, and an eye, skin, and respiratory irritant.
Earthcide, or Fartox	Some of the many names for pentachloronitrobenzene, a fungicide.
Putrescine	Putrescine A foul-smelling diamine produced by the putrefaction of dead animal tissue.

=== Related to religion or legend ===
Angelic acid	Angelic acid An organic acid found in garden angelica (Angelica archangelica), Umbelliferae, and many other plants.
DAMN	Diaminomaleonitrile, a cyanocarbon that contains two amine groups and two nitrile groups bound to an ethylene backbone.
Diabolic acid	A series of long-chain dicarboxylic acids with chains of different lengths. Named after the Greek word diaballo meaning to mislead.
Draculin	An anticoagulant found in the saliva of vampire bats.
Vitamin C (Godnose)	Albert Szent-Györgyi coined the term "ignose" to describe ascorbic acid, which he isolated and published. When the journal's editor refused to accept ignose as a plausible name, Szent-Györgyi suggested 'Godnose' (a joke meaning that only God could know the real identity of the molecule). The editor suggested that the name be changed to something more formal.
Luciferase	A generic term for the class of oxidative enzymes that produce bioluminescence.
Lucifer yellow	Lucifer Yellow is a food coloring that is commonly found in hot sauces such as salsa pickle. Because it fluoresces under ultraviolet light and stains certain regions between plant cells, it's also used in plant microscopy anatomy studies.
Miraculin	A glycoprotein found in miracle fruit that makes sour foods taste sweet after contact with taste buds.

=== Sounds like a name (person, brand or organization) ===
Adamantane	Adamantane (tricyclo[3.3.1.1^{3,7}]decane), a crystalline cycloalkane, an isomer of twistane. Name resembles that of English pop star Adam Ant.
Irene	Hantzsch-Widman nomenclature for a monocyclic, heterocyclic compound with three ring atoms.
Naftazone	(C_{11}H_{9}N_{3}O_{2}), a vasoprotective drug. The NAFTA free-trade zone is the area covered by the North American Free Trade Agreement.
PEPPSI	Pyridine-Enhanced Precatalyst Preparation Stabilization and Initiation.

=== A part sounds like an English word ===
Antipain	Antipain works as a protease inhibitor, preventing proteins from being degraded. It is a highly toxic compound that, ironically, causes severe itching or pain when it comes into contact with the skin. Because it inhibits the action of papain, an enzyme found in papayas, its name is actually an abbreviation of anti-papain.
Constipatic Acid	Some Australian lichens, like Parmelia constipata, have this as a component. Protoconstipatic acid, dehydroconstipatic acid, and methyl constipatate are all constipatic acid derivatives.
DiNOsar	Common shortening of di-nitro sarcophagine. Used due to shorter length compared to the IUPAC name of 1,8-dinitro-3,6,10,13,16,19-hexaazabicyclo[6.6.6]icosane. Sounds similar to the word dinosaur
Gardenin	Gardenins, which are flavones extracted from the Indian plant Gardenia lucida, come in a variety of forms.
Hirsutene	Hirsutene Is also named after an animal, a goat (Hircus).
Magic acid	A superacid consisting of a mixture, most commonly in a 1:1 molar ratio, of fluorosulfuric acid (HSO_{3}F) and antimony pentafluoride (SbF_{5}).
Megaphone	A ketone derived from the root of Aniba megaphylla.
Melon	A compound consisting mostly of linked heptazine units with an undetermined composition. Melon
Mispickel	An older name for the mineral arsenopyrite, an iron arsenic sulfide and major source of the element arsenic, sounds like 'miss pickle'. From German.
Moronic acid	Moronic acid [3-oxoolean-18-en-28-oic acid], a natural triterpene
Performic acid	A strongly oxidizing acid related to formic acid.
Noggin	A signalling protein involved in embryonic development.
Nonose	A monosaccharide with nine carbons. An example is sialic acid.
Periodic acid	Periodic acid Or per-iodic acid, is pronounced /ˌpɜːraɪˈɒdɪk/ PURR-eye-OD-ik and not */ˌpɪəriˈɒdɪk/ PEER-ee-OD-ik. It refers to one of two interconvertible species: HIO_{4} (metaperiodic acid), or H_{5}IO_{6} (orthoperiodic acid – illustrated at right). The per- prefix in the name denotes that iodine is present in its highest possible (+7) oxidation state.
Picket Fence Porphyrin	(5,10,15,20-tetrakis(alpha,alpha,alpha-2-pivalamidophenyl)porphyrin), used to model heme enzyme active sites.
Piranha solution	A strongly oxidizing mixture of hydrogen peroxide and sulfuric acid used to remove organic residues from substrates and glassware. The name refers to the voracious appetite of the Amazonian piranha fish.
Rednose	A sugar derived from the degradation of rudolphomycin.
Rhamnose	Rhamnose A sugar naturally occurring in buckthorn (rhamnus).
Ru(Tris)BiPy-on-a-stick	Shorthand form of (trans-1,4-bis[(4-pyridyl)ethenyl]benzene)(2,2'-bipyridine)ruthenium(II).
Traumatic acid	Traumatic acid A substance occurring in plants, with a role in healing damaged tissue.

=== Other ===
Bastardane	A close relative to tetramantane (a higher homologue of adamantane), its proper name is nonacyclo[11.7.1.1^{12,18}.0^{3,16}.0^{4,13}.0^{5,10}.0^{6,14}.0^{7,11}.0^{15,20}]docosane. Because its unusual ethano-bridge was a deviation from the standard hydrocarbon caged rearrangements, it came to be known as bastardane—the unwanted child.
Dinocap	Dinocap (C_{18}H_{24}N_{2}O_{6}), a miticide and contact fungicide used to control powdery mildew in crops.
DuPhos	DuPhos A class of asymmetric ligands for asymmetric synthesis. The name DuPhos is derived from the chemical company that developed this type of ligand (DuP, DuPont) and the compound class of phospholanes (Phos) it belongs to.
FOOF	Dioxygen difluoride, O_{2}F_{2}, an extremely unstable compound which reacts explosively with most other substances – the nickname "FOOF" is a play on its formula.
Furfuryl furfurate	The name of the molecule is difficult to say fast. It has a strong odor and can be used as a polymerization inhibitor in the vapor phase. Its name is derived from the Latin word "furfur," which means "bran" (the source of the compound). Furfural alcohol, a related molecule, is reportedly used in the fabrication of the Reinforced Carbon-Carbon (RCC) sections used in the space shuttle.
Gossypol	Gossypol A toxin found in cottonseed used as a male oral contraceptive.
Methionylthreonylthreonyl glutaminylarginyl...isoleucine	The IUPAC name for titin. This is the largest known protein and so has the longest chemical name. Written in full, it contains 189,819 letters.
MOM	A functional group often employed in organic synthesis to protect alcohols.
Periplanone B	Periplanone B A pheromone of the female American cockroach.
Thebacon	Thebacon Dihydrocodeinone enol acetate, an opioid analgesic or antitussive.
NiGa_{2}O_{4}	A nickel and gallium spinel.

== See also ==
- International Union of Pure and Applied Chemistry
- IUPAC nomenclature
- List of places with unusual names
- List of unusual biological names
- List of chemical elements named after places

== Bibliography ==
- E.C. Alyea, "Metal Complexes of Ditertiary Arsines. Chapter in Transition Metal Complexes of Phosphorus, Arsenic and Antimony Ligands", MacMillan, 1973. Chapter: "Some amusing names of arsine ligands: edas, vdias, dam, ffars etc"
- J. Andraos, "Glossary of Coined Names & Terms Used in Science", York University, 2004.
- Giles, P.M. (1999). "Revised Section F: Natural products and related compounds". Pure Appl. Chem. 71 (4): 587–643. doi:10.1351/pac199971040587. S2CID 94379874.
- Aronson, Jeff (1999). "That's show business". British Medical Journal. 319 (7215): 972. doi:10.1136/bmj.319.7215.972. PMC 1116803. PMID 10514162.
- Browne, Malcolm W. (April 22, 1986). "Chemists dabble in whimsy". International New York Times.
- Paul May, "Molecules with Silly or Unusual Names," Imperial College Press, July 2008, ISBN 978-1-84816-207-5.
- Metanomski, W. V. (1987). "Unusual Names Assigned to chemical substances". Chem. Int. 9: 211–215.
- Monk, Felonious (13 April 2006). "Chemical Cock-ups: A Story of How Not to Name a Chemical Compound". h2g2: The guide to life, the universe and everything. Not Panicking Ltd.
- Alex Nickon and Ernest F. Silversmith, "Organic Chemistry, the Name Game: Modern Coined Terms and Their Origins", Pergamon 1987. ISBN 0-08-034481-X.
- Randall, David (February 1, 2004). "Storyville: Molecular scientists have a word for it". The Independent on Sunday. London, England.(subscription required)
- Wallechinsky, David; Wallace, Amy (2005). "24. Molecules and amoebas with funny names". The new book of lists : the original compendium of curious information. New York, N.Y.: Canongate. pp. 203–205. ISBN 9781841957197.
