= Preferred IUPAC name =

Chemical naming convention

In chemical nomenclature, a preferred IUPAC name (PIN) is a unique name, assigned to a chemical substance and preferred among all possible names generated by IUPAC nomenclature. The "preferred IUPAC nomenclature" provides a set of rules for choosing between multiple possibilities in situations where it is important to decide on a unique name. It is intended for use in legal and regulatory situations.

Preferred IUPAC names are applicable only for organic compounds, to which the IUPAC (International Union of Pure and Applied Chemistry) has the definition as compounds which contain at least a single carbon atom but no alkali, alkaline earth or transition metals and can be named by the nomenclature of organic compounds (see below). Rules for the remaining organic and inorganic compounds are still under development. The concept of PINs is defined in the introductory chapter and chapter 5 of the "Nomenclature of Organic Chemistry: IUPAC Recommendations and Preferred Names 2013" (freely accessible), which replace two former publications: the "Nomenclature of Organic Chemistry", 1979 (the Blue Book) and "A Guide to IUPAC Nomenclature of Organic Compounds, Recommendations 1993". The full draft version of the PIN recommendations ("Preferred names in the nomenclature of organic compounds", Draft of 7 October 2004) is also available.

== Definitions ==
A preferred IUPAC name (PIN) is a name that is preferred among two or more IUPAC names. An IUPAC name is a systematic name that meets the recommended IUPAC rules. IUPAC names include retained names. A general IUPAC name is any IUPAC name that is not a "preferred IUPAC name". A retained name is a traditional or otherwise often used name, usually a trivial name, that may be used in IUPAC nomenclature.

Since systematic names often are not human-readable a PIN may be a retained name. Both "PINs" and "retained names" have to be picked (and established by IUPAC) explicitly, unlike other IUPAC names, which automatically arise from IUPAC nomenclatural rules. Thus, the PIN is sometimes the retained name (e.g., phenol and acetic acid, instead of benzenol and ethanoic acid), while in other cases, the systematic name was chosen over a very common retained name (e.g., propan-2-one, instead of acetone).

A preselected name is a preferred name chosen among two or more names for parent hydrides or other parent structures that do not contain carbon (inorganic parents). "Preselected names" are used in the nomenclature of organic compounds as the basis for PINs for organic derivatives. They are needed for derivatives of organic compounds that do not contain carbon themselves. A preselected name is not necessarily a PIN in inorganic chemical nomenclature.

== Basic principles ==
The systems of chemical nomenclature developed by the International Union of Pure and Applied Chemistry (IUPAC) have traditionally concentrated on ensuring that chemical names are unambiguous, that is that a name can only refer to one substance. However, a single substance can have more than one acceptable name, like toluene, which may also be correctly named as "methylbenzene" or "phenylmethane". Some alternative names remain available as "retained names" for more general contexts. For example, tetrahydrofuran remains an unambiguous and acceptable name for the common organic solvent, even if the preferred IUPAC name is "oxolane".

The nomenclature goes:

- Preselected names are to be used.
- Substitutive nomenclature (replacement of hydrogen atoms in the parent structure) is used most extensively, for example "ethoxyethane" instead of diethyl ether and "tetrachloromethane" instead of carbon tetrachloride.
- Functional class naming (also known as radicofunctional nomenclature) is preferred next. In the case of acid anhydrides, esters, acyl halides and pseudohalides and salts, this method takes precedence over substitution.
- Skeletal replacement ('a', named for the suffix), if it both applies and a heteroatom is found in a chain, is preferred over substitution. If it applies but no heteroatom is found in a chain, it is preferred over multiplicative nomenclature. Example: 3-phospha-2,5,7-trisilaoctane refers to CH_{3}−SiH_{2}−PH−CH_{2}−SiH_{2}−CH_{2}−SiH_{2}−CH_{3}.
  - Skeletal replacement mainly replaces carbon with other atoms, or in the case of phane nomenclature, whole "superatom" rings. It also includes more complex replacements, such as the lambda convention.
- Multiplicative nomenclature is to be preferred over simple substitutive if it can be used. This is the nomenclature with an apostrophe after numbers such as 4'; it allows multiple occurrences of the principal characteristic group or compound class to be treated together. Example: 4,4′-sulfanediyldibenzoic acid refers to (COOH−C_{6}H_{4})_{2}S.

The following are available, but not given special preference:

- Conjunctive nomenclature is available, but substitutive, multiplicative, or skeletal should be preferred. Example: benzene-1,3,5-triacetic acid should instead be named 2,2′,2′′-(benzene-1,3,5-triyl)triacetic acid.
- Additive and subtractive operations remain available as with the general case. For example, one keeps changing "ane" into "ene" for double bonds. Additive operations generally have better names derived from the above rules, such as phenyloxirane for styrene oxide.

== Retained names ==
The number of retained non-systematic, trivial names of simple organic compounds (for example formic acid and acetic acid) has been reduced considerably for preferred IUPAC names, although a larger set of retained names is available for general nomenclature. The traditional names of simple monosaccharides, α-amino acids and many natural products have been retained as preferred IUPAC names; in these cases the systematic names may be very complicated and virtually never used. The name for water itself is a retained IUPAC name.

== Scope of the nomenclature for organic compounds ==
In IUPAC nomenclature, all compounds containing carbon atoms are considered organic compounds. Organic nomenclature only applies to organic compounds containing elements from the Groups 13 through 17. Organometallic compounds of the Groups 1 through 12 are not covered by organic nomenclature.
