= Trivial name =

Common name for a chemical substance

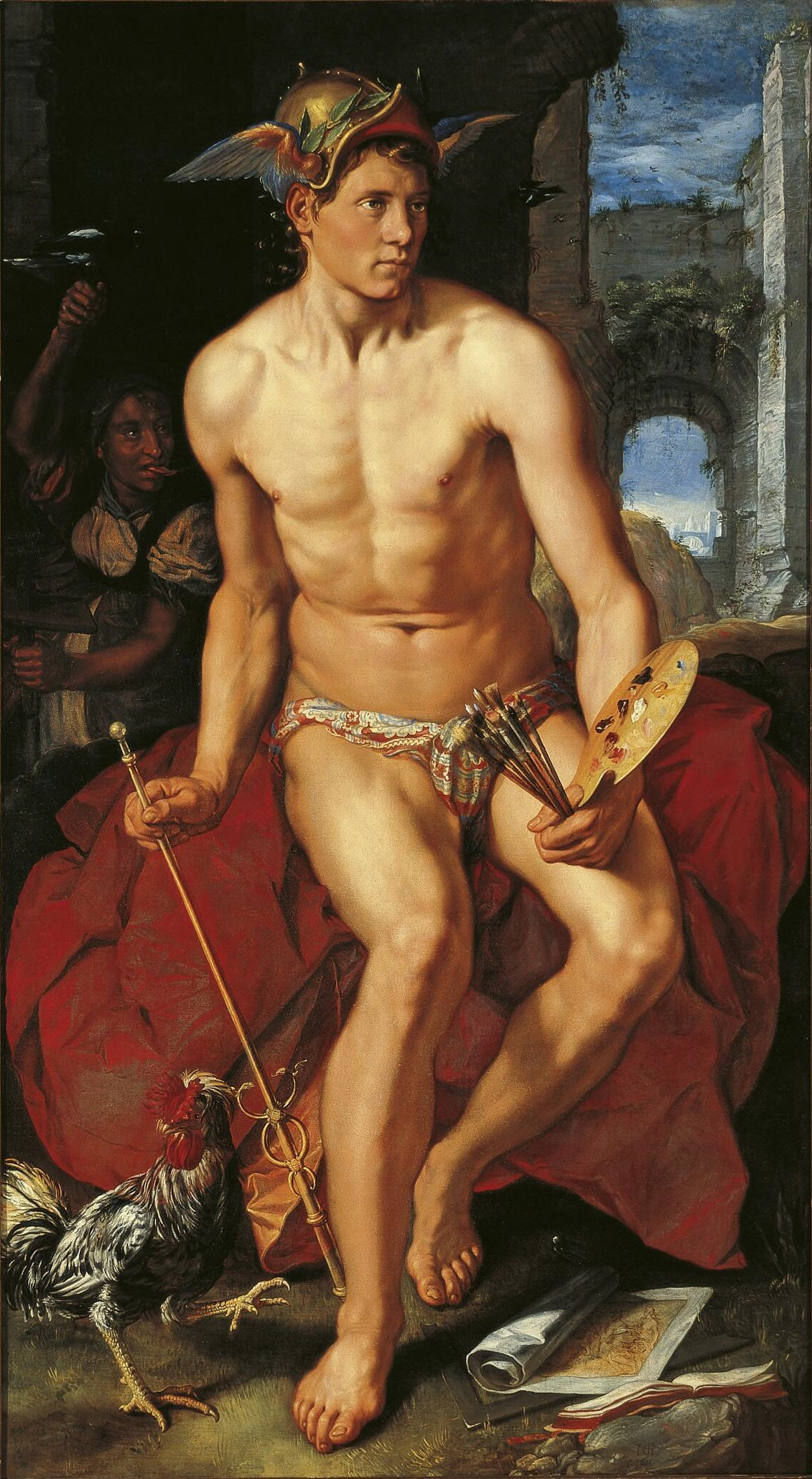
The element mercury was named after the Roman god of the same name (painting by Hendrik Goltzius).

In chemistry, a trivial name is a non-systematic name for a chemical substance. This means that the name is not recognized according to the rules of any formal system of chemical nomenclature such as IUPAC inorganic or IUPAC organic nomenclature. A trivial name is not a formal name and is usually a common name.

Generally, trivial names are not useful in describing the essential properties of the thing named, such as the molecular structure of a chemical compound. And, in some cases, trivial names can be ambiguous or carry different meanings in different industries or different geographic regions (for example, a trivial name such as white metal can mean various things). A limited number of trivial chemical names are retained names, an accepted part of the nomenclature.

Trivial names often arise in the common language; they may come from historical usages in, for example, alchemy. Many trivial names pre-date the institution of formal naming conventions. Names can be based on a property of the chemical, including appearance (color, taste or smell), consistency, and crystal structure; a place where it was found or where the discoverer comes from; the name of a scientist; a mythological figure; an astronomical body; the shape of the molecule; and even fictional figures. All elements that have been isolated have trivial names.

== Definitions ==
In scientific documents, international treaties, patents and legal definitions, names for chemicals are needed that identify them unambiguously. This need is satisfied by systematic names. One such system, established by the International Union of Pure and Applied Chemistry (IUPAC), was established in 1950. Other systems have been developed by the American Chemical Society, the International Organization for Standardization, and the World Health Organization. However, chemists still use many names that are not systematic because they are traditional or because they are more convenient than the systematic names. These are called trivial names. The word "trivial", often used in a pejorative sense, was intended to mean "commonplace".

In addition to trivial names, chemists have constructed semi-trivial names by appending a standard symbol to a trivial stem. Some trivial and semi-trivial names are so widely used that they have been officially adopted by IUPAC; these are known as retained names.

=== Pesticide common names ===
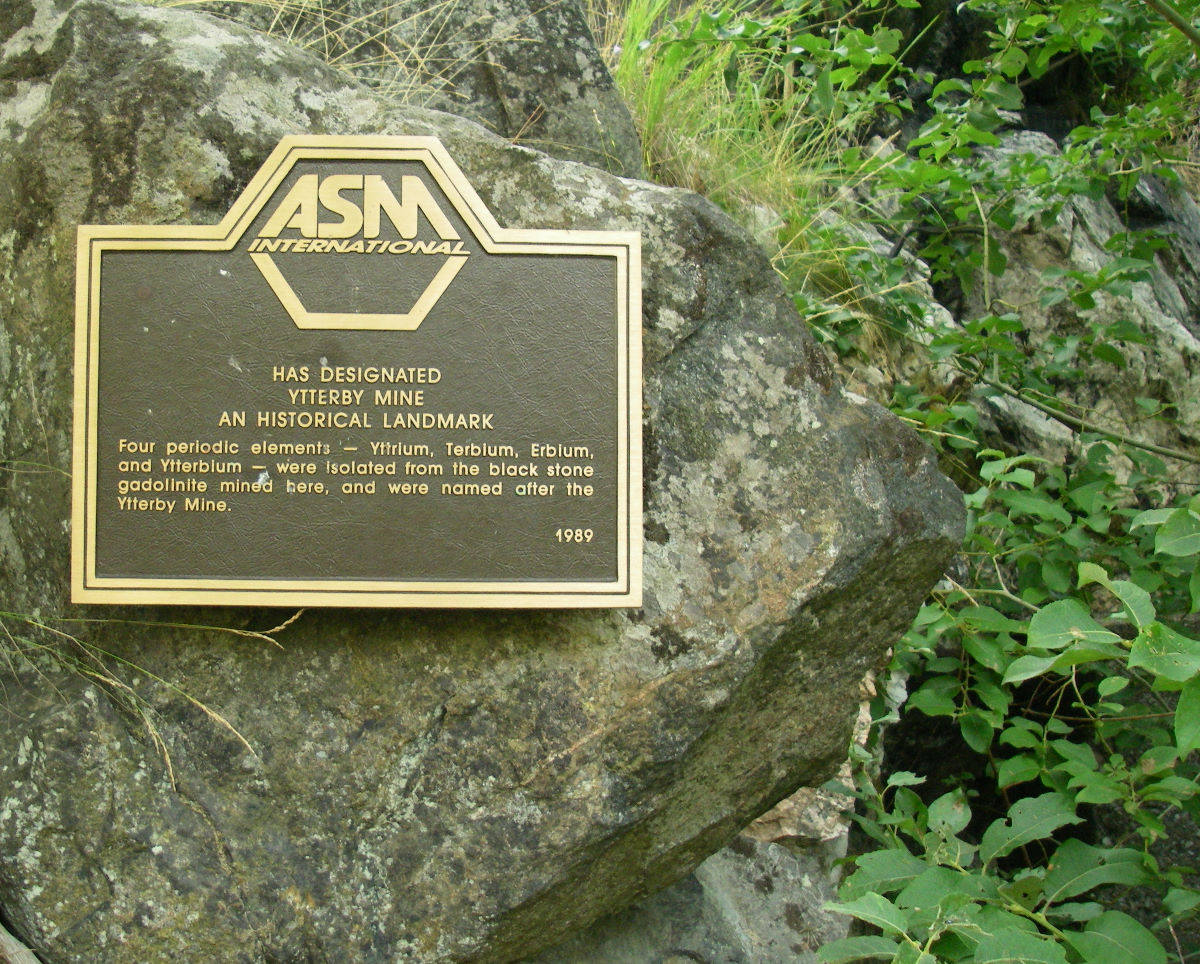
A plaque commemorating a mine in Ytterby where ore was obtained from which four new elements were isolated.

The common names used for pesticides did not become commonplace through repeated informal usage, The names are granted by ISO committee (TC81), who approve the common name according to ISO1750.

== Elements ==
Traditional names of elements are trivial, some originating in alchemy. IUPAC has accepted these names, but has also defined systematic names of elements that have not yet been prepared. It has adopted a procedure by which the scientists who are credited with preparing an element can propose a new name. Once the IUPAC has accepted such a (trivial) name, it replaces the systematic name.

=== Origins ===
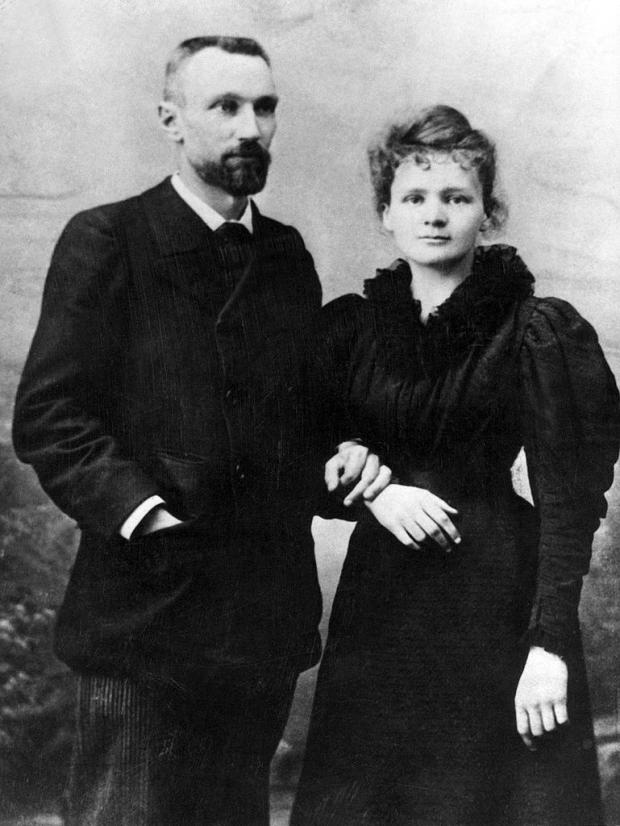
Curium was named after Pierre and Marie Curie.

Nine elements were known by the Middle Ages: gold, silver, tin, mercury, copper, lead, iron, sulfur, and carbon. Mercury was named after the planet, but its symbol was derived from the Latin hydrargyrum, which itself comes from the Greek υδράργυρος, meaning liquid silver; mercury is also known as quicksilver in English. The symbols for the other eight are derived from their Latin names.

Systematic nomenclature began after Louis-Bernard Guyton de Morveau stated the need for "a constant method of denomination, which helps the intelligence and relieves the memory". The resulting system was popularized by Antoine Lavoisier's publication of Méthode de nomenclature chimique (Method of Chemical Nomenclature) in 1787. Lavoisier proposed that elements be named after their properties. For the next 125 years, most chemists followed this suggestion, using Greek and Latin roots to compose the names; for example, hydrogen ("water-producing"), oxygen ("acid-producing"), nitrogen ("soda-producing"), bromine ("stink"), and argon were based on Greek roots, while the names of iodine and chlorine were derived from the Greek words for their characteristic colors. Indium, rubidium, and thallium were similarly named for the colors of particular lines in their emission spectra. Iridium, which forms compounds of many different colors, takes its name from iris, the Latin for "rainbow". The noble gases have all been named for their origin or properties. Helium comes from the Greek helios, meaning "Sun" because it was first detected as a line in the spectrum of the Sun (it is not known why the suffix -ium, which is used for metals, was chosen). The other noble gases are neon ("new"), argon ("slow, lazy"), krypton ("hidden"), xenon ("stranger"), and radon ("from radium").

Many more elements have been given names that have little or nothing to do with their properties. Elements have been named for celestial bodies (helium, selenium, tellurium, for the Sun, Moon, and Earth; cerium and palladium for Ceres and Pallas, two asteroids). They have been named for mythological figures, including Titans in general (titanium) and Prometheus in particular (promethium); Roman and Greek gods (uranium, neptunium, and plutonium) and their descendants (tantalum for Tantalus, a son of Zeus, and niobium for Niobe, a daughter of Tantalus); and Norse deities (vanadium for the goddess Vanadis and thorium for the god Thor).

Some elements were named for aspects of the history of their discovery. In particular, technetium and promethium were so named because the first samples detected were artificially synthesised; neither of the two has any isotope sufficiently stable to occur in nature on Earth in significant quantities. The connection to the Titan Prometheus was that he had been fabled to have stolen fire from the gods for mankind.

Discoverers of some elements named them after their home country or city. Marie Curie named polonium after Poland; ruthenium, gallium, germanium, and lutetium were based on the Latin names for Russia, France, Germany, and Paris. Other elements are named after the place where they were discovered. Four elements — terbium, erbium, ytterbium, and yttrium — were named after the Swedish village Ytterby, where ores containing them were extracted. Other elements named after places are magnesium (after Magnesia), strontium, scandium, europium, thulium (after an old Roman name for an unidentified northern region), holmium, copper (derived from Cyprus, where it was mined in the Roman era), hafnium, rhenium, americium, berkelium, californium, and darmstadtium.

For the elements up to 92 (uranium), naming elements after people was discouraged. The two exceptions are indirect, the elements being named after minerals that were themselves named after people. These were gadolinium (found in gadolinite, named after the Finnish chemist Johan Gadolin) and samarium (the mineral samarskite was named after a Russian mining engineer, Vasili Samarsky-Bykhovets). Among the transuranium elements, this restriction was relaxed; there followed curium (after the Curies), einsteinium (Albert Einstein), fermium (Enrico Fermi), mendelevium (Dmitri Mendeleev), nobelium (Alfred Nobel) and lawrencium (Ernest Lawrence).

=== Relation to IUPAC standards ===
IUPAC has established international standards for naming elements. The first scientist or laboratory to isolate an element has the right to propose a name; after a review process, a final decision is made by the IUPAC Council. In keeping with tradition, names can be based on a mythological concept or character, astronomical object, mineral, place, property of the element or scientist. For those elements that have not yet been discovered, IUPAC has established a systematic name system. The names combine syllables that represent the digits of the atomic number, followed by "-ium". For example, "unununium" is element 111 ("un" being the syllable for 1). However, once the element has been found, the systematic name is replaced by a trivial one, in this case roentgenium.

The IUPAC names for elements are intended for use in the official languages. At the time of the first edition of the IUPAC Red Book (which contains the rules for inorganic compounds), those languages were English and French; now English is the sole official language. However, other languages still have their own names for elements. The chemical symbol for tungsten, W, is based on the German name Wolfram, which is found in wolframite and comes from the German for "wolf's foam", how the mineral was known to Saxon miners. The name tungsten means "heavy stone", a description of scheelite, another mineral in which tungsten is found. Russian names for hydrogen, oxygen and carbon are vodorod, kislorod and uglerod (generating water, acid and coal respectively). The German names for hydrogen, oxygen, and nitrogen are Wasserstoff (water substance), Sauerstoff (acid substance), and Stickstoff (smothering substance). The corresponding Chinese names are qīngqì (light gas), yǎngqì (nourishing gas), and dànqì (diluting gas). A method for translating chemical names into Chinese was developed by John Fryer and Xu Shou in 1871. Where traditional names were well established, they kept them; otherwise, a single character was created. (Note: The created character consists of a radical – which, for an element, is "metal" or "air" (gas) or "water" (liquid) or "stone" (metalloid) – and a component for the sound from a Western name of the element. For details, see Chemical elements in East Asian languages#Chinese.)

== Inorganic chemistry ==
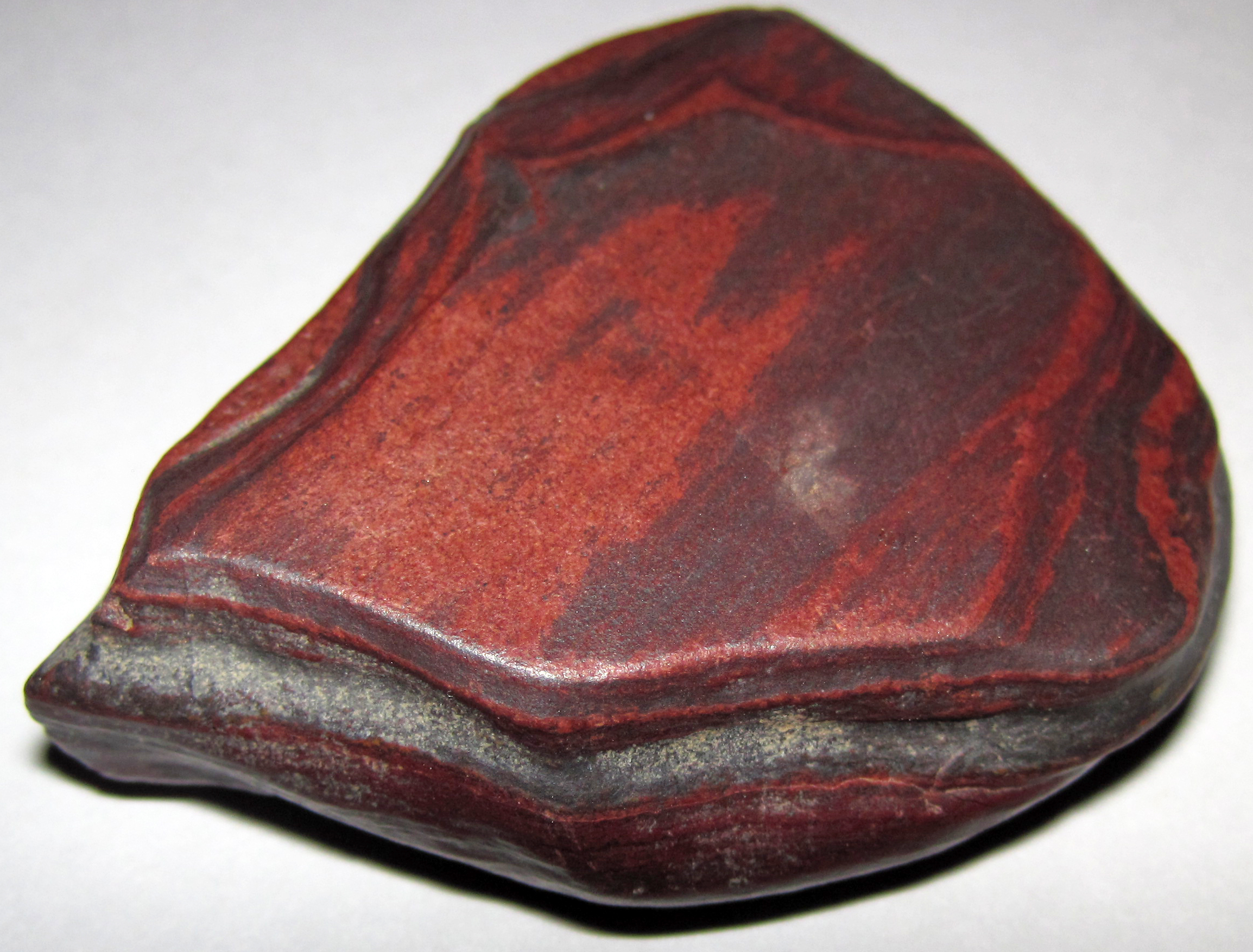
Red hematite-rich sample from a banded iron formation in Wyoming.

Early terminology for compound chemicals followed similar rules to the naming of elements. The names could be based on the appearance of the substance, including all five senses. In addition, chemicals were named after the consistency, crystalline form, a person or place, its putative medical properties or method of preparation.

Salt (sodium chloride) is soluble and is used to enhance the taste of food. Substances with similar properties came to be known as salts, in particular Epsom salt (magnesium sulfate, found in a bitter saline spring in the English town of Epsom). Ammonium (with the little-used systematic name azanium) was first extracted from sal ammoniac, meaning "salt of Amun". Ancient Romans noticed crystals of it in Egyptian temples devoted to the god Amun; the crystals had condensed from the smoke of burning camel dung. Lead acetate was called sugar of lead. However, other names like sugar of lead (lead(II) acetate), butter of antimony (antimony trichloride), oil of vitriol (sulfuric acid), and cream of tartar (potassium bitartrate) borrowed their language from the kitchen. Many more names were based on color; for example, hematite, orpiment, and verdigris come from words meaning "blood-like stone", "gold pigment", and "green of Greece".

Some names are based on their use. Lime is a general name for materials combining calcium with carbonates, oxides or hydroxides; the name comes from a root "sticking or adhering"; its earliest use was as mortar for construction.

Water has several systematic names, including oxidane (the IUPAC name), hydrogen oxide, and dihydrogen monoxide (DHMO). The latter was the basis of the dihydrogen monoxide hoax, a document that was circulated warning readers of the dangers of the chemical (for example, it is fatal if inhaled).

== Organic chemistry ==
In organic chemistry, some trivial names derive from a notable property of the thing being named. For instance, lecithin, the common name for phosphatidylcholine, was originally isolated from egg yolk. The word is coined from the Greek λέκιθος (lékithos) for yolk.

Many trivial names continue to be used because their sanctioned equivalents are considered too cumbersome for everyday use. For example, "tartaric acid", a compound found in wine, has a systematic name of 2,3-dihydroxybutanedioic acid. The pigment β-Carotene has an IUPAC name of 1,3,3-trimethyl-2-[(1E,3E,5E,7E,9E,11E,13E,15E,17E)-3,7,12,16-tetramethyl-18-(2,6,6-trimethylcyclohexen-1-yl)octadeca-1,3,5,7,9,11,13,15,17-nonaenyl]cyclohexene. However, the trivial name can be potentially confusing. Based on its name, one might come to the conclusion that the molecule theobromine contains one or more bromine atoms. In reality it is an alkaloid similar in structure to caffeine.

=== Shape-based ===
Several organic molecules have semitrivial names where the suffixes -ane (for an alkane) or -ene (for an alkene) are added to a name based on the shape of the molecule. Some are pictured below. Other examples include barrelene (shaped like a barrel), fenestrane (having a window-pane motif), ladderane (a ladder shape), olympiadane (having a shape with the same topology as the Olympic rings) and quadratic acid (also known as squaric acid).

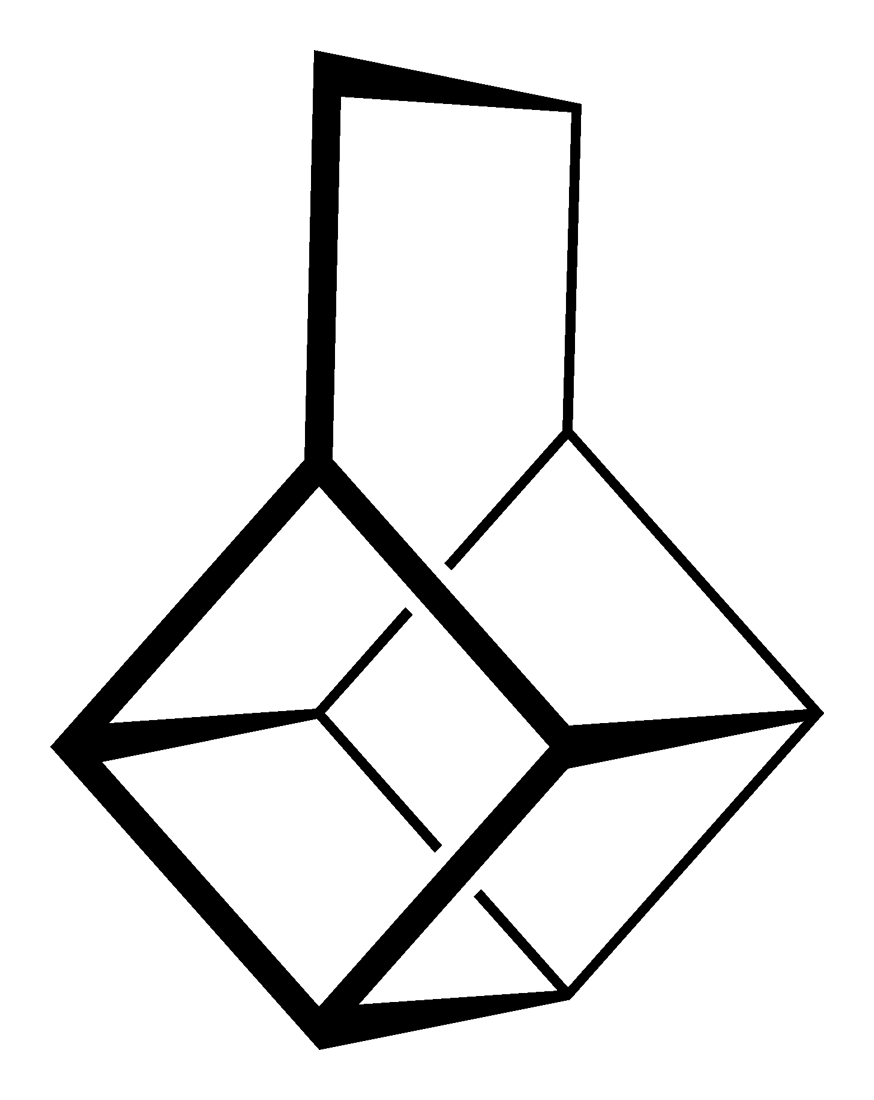
Basketane

Cubane

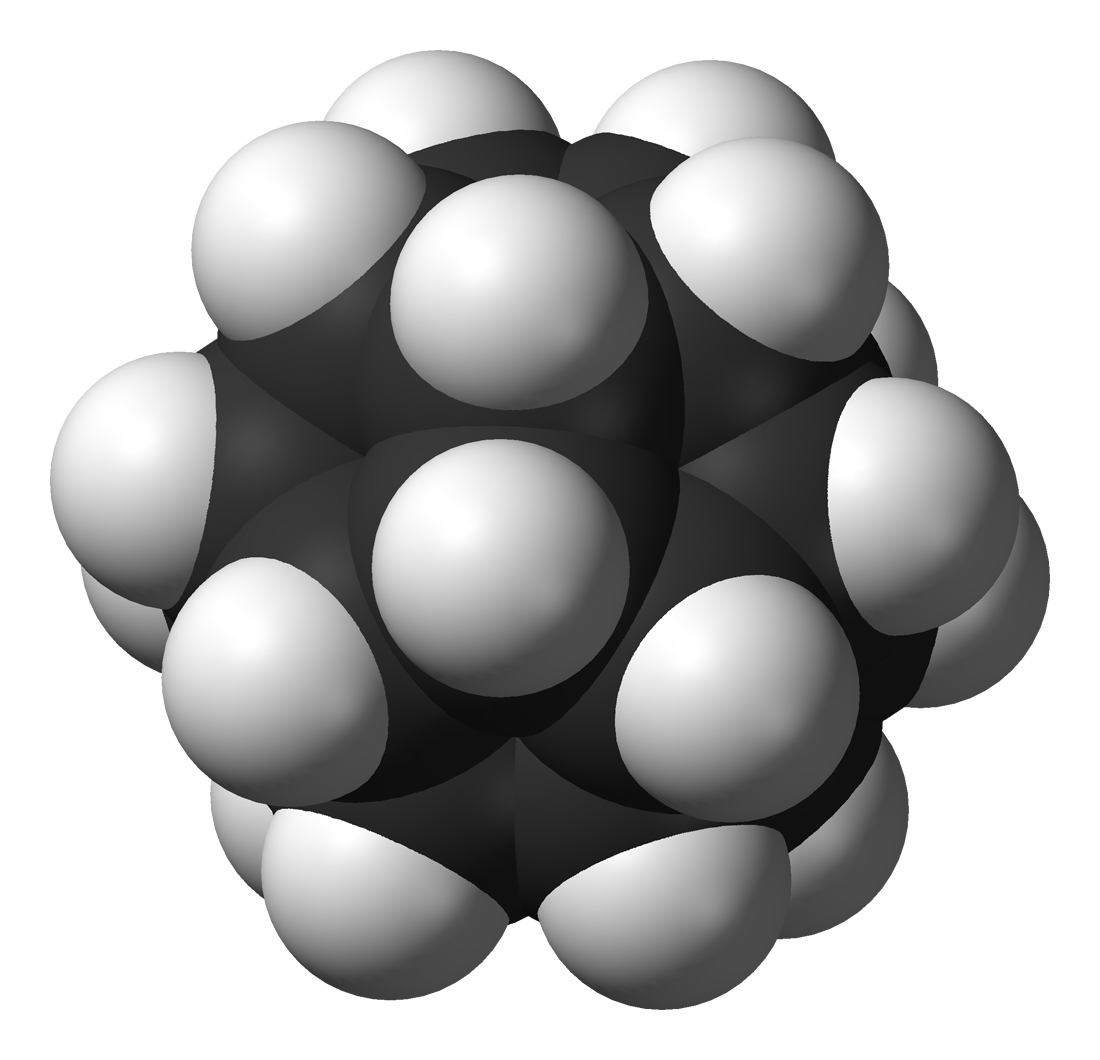
Dodecahedrane

Housane

Olympicene

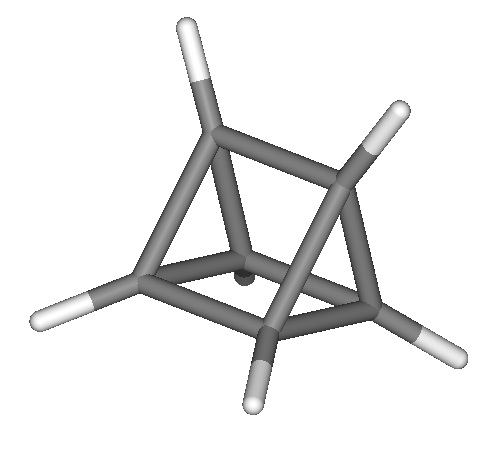
Prismane

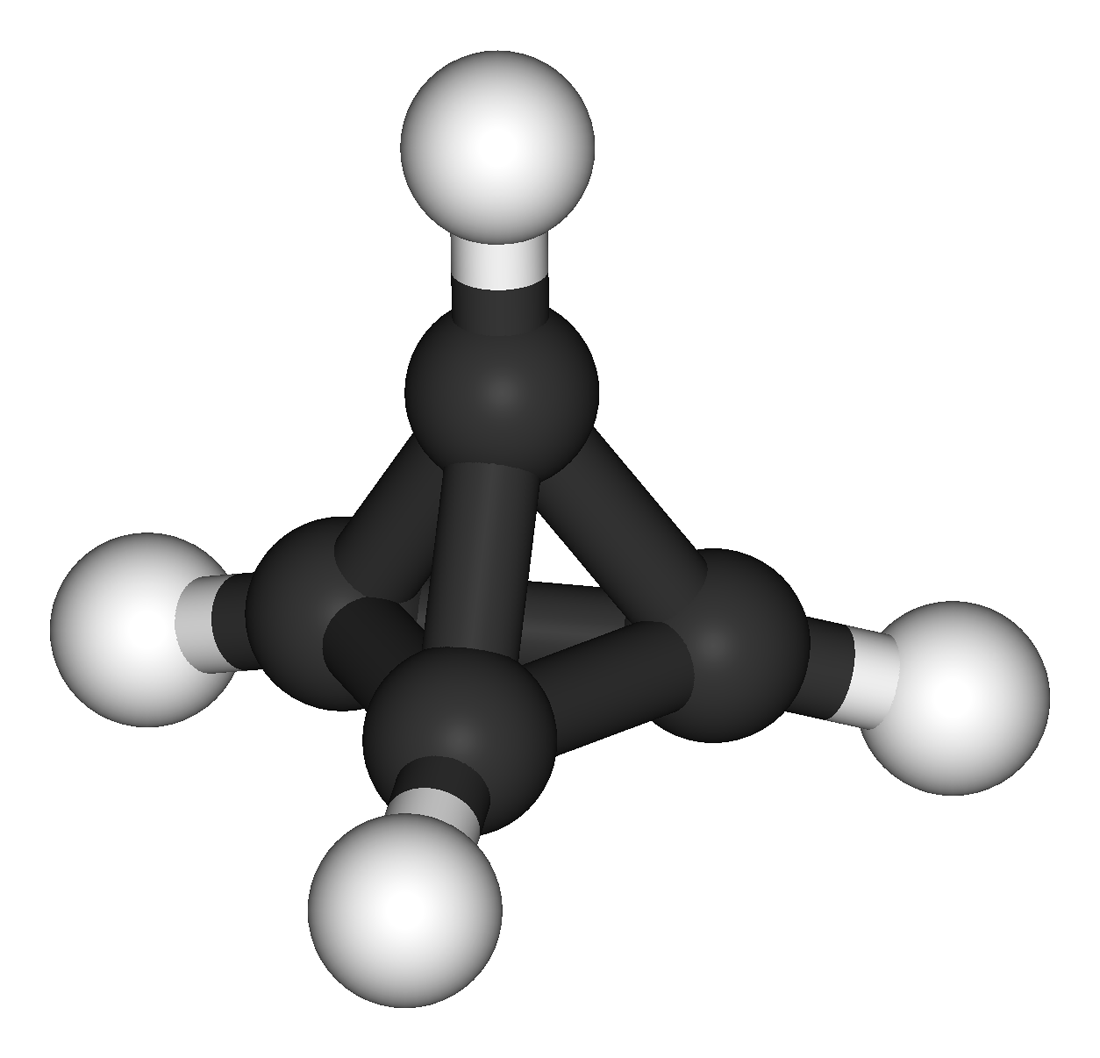
Tetrahedrane

=== Based on fiction ===
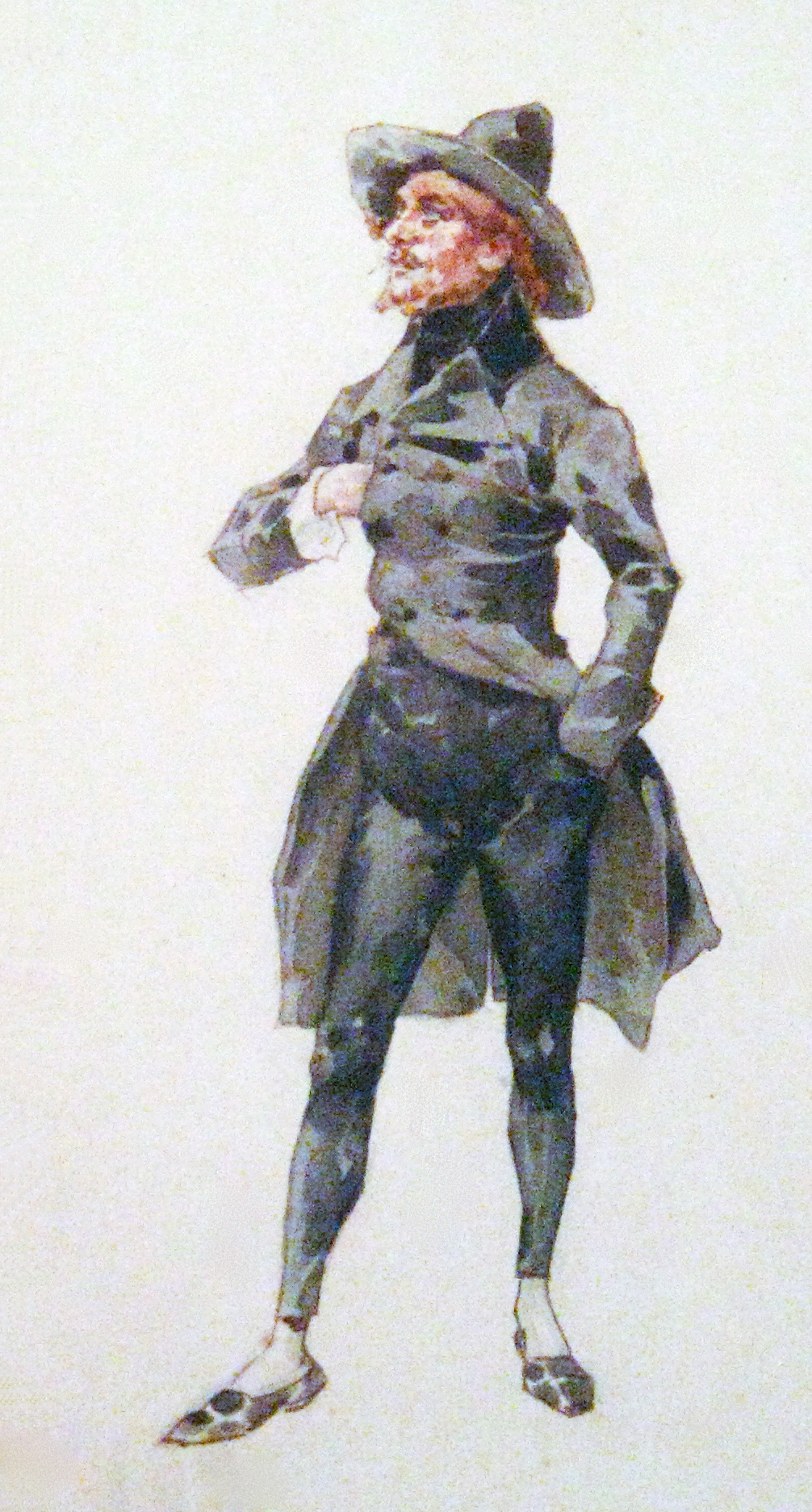
The antibiotic rudolphomycin is named after the character Rodolfo from the opera La Bohème.

The bohemic acid complex is a mixture of chemicals obtained through fermentation of a species of actinobacteria. In 1977 the components were isolated and have been found useful as antitumor agents and anthracycline antibiotics. The authors named the complex (and one of its components, bohemamine) after the opera La bohème by Puccini, and the remaining components were named after characters in the opera: alcindoromycin (Alcindoro), collinemycin (Colline), marcellomycin (Marcello), mimimycin (Mimi), musettamycin (Musetta), rudolphomycin (Rodolfo) and schaunardimycin (Schaunard). However, the relationships between the characters do not correctly reflect the chemical relationships.

A research lab at Lepetit Pharmaceuticals, led by Piero Sensi, was fond of coining nicknames for chemicals that they discovered, later converting them to a form more acceptable for publication. The antibiotic rifampicin was named after a French movie, Rififi, about a jewel heist. They nicknamed another antibiotic "Mata Hari" before changing the name to matamycin.

=== Trivial nomenclature ===
Trivial nomenclature uses the older names for some organic compounds instead of using the prefixes for the carbon skeleton above. The pattern can be seen below.

Number of carbons	Prefix as in new system	Trivial name for alcohol	Trivial name for aldehyde	Trivial name for acid	Trivial name for ketone
1	Meth-	Methyl alcohol (wood alcohol)	Formaldehyde	Formic acid	NA
2	Eth-	Ethyl alcohol (grain alcohol)	Acetaldehyde	Acetic acid (vinegar)	NA
3	Prop-	Propyl alcohol	Propionaldehyde	Propionic acid	Acetone/dimethyl ketone
4	But-	Butyl alcohol	Butyraldehyde	Butyric acid	Methyl ethyl ketone
5	Pent-	Amyl alcohol	Valeraldehyde	Valeric acid	•Methyl propyl ketone •Diethyl ketone
6	Hex-	Caproyl alcohol	Caproaldehyde	Caproic acid	•Butyl methyl ketone •Ethyl propyl ketone
7	Hept-	Enanthyl alcohol	Enanthaldehyde	Enanthoic acid	•Methyl pentyl ketone •Butyl ethyl ketone •Dipropyl ketone
8	Oct-	Capryl alcohol	Caprylaldehyde	Caprylic acid	•Hexyl methyl ketone •Ethyl pentyl ketone •Butyl propyl ketone
9	Non-	Pelargonic alcohol	Pelargonaldehyde	Pelargonic acid	•Heptyl methyl ketone •Ethyl hexyl ketone •Pentyl propyl ketone •Dibutyl ketone
10	Dec-	Capric alcohol	Capraldehyde	Capric acid	•Methyl octyl ketone •Ethyl heptyl ketone •Hexyl propyl ketone •Butyl pentyl ketone
11	Undec-	-	-	-	The same pattern continues (see below)
12	Dodec-	Lauryl alcohol	Lauraldehyde	Lauric acid	The same pattern continues (see below)
13	Tridec-	-	-	-	The same pattern continues (see below)
14	Tetradec-	Myristyl alcohol	Myristaldehyde	Myristic acid	The same pattern continues (see below)
15	Pentadec-	-	-	-	The same pattern continues (see below)
16	Hexadec-	Cetyl alcohol Palmityl alcohol	Palmitaldehyde	Palmitic acid	The same pattern continues (see below)
17	Heptadec-	-	-	Margaric acid	The same pattern continues (see below)
18	Octadec-	Stearyl alcohol	Stearaldehyde	Stearic acid	The same pattern continues (see below)
19	Nonadec-	-	-	-	The same pattern continues (see below)
20	Icos-	Arachidyl alcohol	-	Arachidic acid	The same pattern continues (see below)
21	Henicos-	-	-	-	The same pattern continues (see below)
22	Docos-	Behenyl alcohol	-	Behenic acid	The same pattern continues (see below)
23	Tricos-	-	-	-	The same pattern continues (see below)
24	Tetracos-	Lignoceryl alcohol	-	Lignoceric acid	The same pattern continues (see below)
25	Pentacos-	-	-	-	The same pattern continues (see below)
26	Hexacos-	Ceryl alcohol	-	Cerotic acid	The same pattern continues (see below)
27	Heptacos-	-	-	-	The same pattern continues (see below)
28	Octacos-	Montanyl alcohol	-	Montanic acid	The same pattern continues (see below)
29	Nonacos-	-	-	-	The same pattern continues (see below)
30	Triacont-	Melissyl alcohol	-	Melissic acid	The same pattern continues (see below)
31	Hentriacont-	-	-	-	The same pattern continues (see below)
32	Dotriacont-	Lacceryl alcohol	-	Lacceroic acid	The same pattern continues (see below)
33	Tritriacont-	Psyllic alcohol	-	Psyllic acid	The same pattern continues (see below)
34	Tetratriacont-	Geddyl alcohol	-	Geddic acid	The same pattern continues (see below)
35	Pentatriacont-	-	-	Ceroplastic acid	The same pattern continues (see below)
36	Hexatriacont-	-	-	-	The same pattern continues (see below)
37	Heptatriacont-	-	-	-	The same pattern continues (see below)
38	Octatriacont-	-	-	-	The same pattern continues (see below)
39	Nonatriacont-	-	-	-	The same pattern continues (see below)
40	Tetracont-	-	-	-	The same pattern continues (see below)

==== Ketones ====
Trivial names for ketones can be derived by naming the two alkyl or aryl groups bonded to the carbonyl group as separate words followed by the word ketone.

- Acetone
- Acetophenone
- Benzophenone
- Ethyl isopropyl ketone
- Diethyl ketone

The first three of the names shown above are still considered to be acceptable IUPAC names.

==== Aldehydes ====
The Trivial name for an aldehyde is derived from the Trivial name of the corresponding carboxylic acid by dropping the word acid and changing the suffix from -ic or -oic to -aldehyde.

- Formaldehyde
- Acetaldehyde

== See also ==
- List of chemical compounds with unusual names
- Organic chemistry: Common nomenclature – trivial names
