= 8-oxocoformycin reductase =

Class of enzymes

Identifiers
- EC no.: 1.1.1.235
- CAS no.: 114995-16-3

Databases
- IntEnz: IntEnz view
- BRENDA: BRENDA entry
- ExPASy: NiceZyme view
- KEGG: KEGG entry
- MetaCyc: metabolic pathway
- PRIAM: profile
- PDB structures: RCSB PDB PDBe PDBsum
- Gene Ontology: AmiGO / QuickGO
Search
- PMC: articles
- PubMed: articles
- NCBI: proteins

In enzymology, a 8-oxocoformycin reductase (EC 1.1.1.235) is an enzyme that catalyzes the chemical reaction

coformycin + NADP^{+} $\rightleftharpoons$ 8-oxocoformycin + NADPH + H^{+}

Thus, the two substrates of this enzyme are coformycin and NADP^{+}, whereas its 3 products are 8-oxocoformycin, NADPH, and H^{+}.

This enzyme belongs to the family of oxidoreductases, specifically those acting on the CH-OH group of donor with NAD^{+} or NADP^{+} as acceptor. The systematic name of this enzyme class is coformycin:NADP^{+} 8-oxidoreductase. This enzyme is also called 8-ketodeoxycoformycin reductase.
