= Megaphone (disambiguation) =

A megaphone is a portable funnel-shaped device used to amplify a person's voice or other sounds.

Megaphone may also refer to:

- Megaphone (podcasting), a podcasting technology company, formerly Panoply Media
- Megaphone (band), rock band from Orlando, Florida
- Megaphone desktop tool, the pro-Israel lobbying software tool
- Megaphone (molecule), cytotoxic neolignan from Aniba megaphylla
- MegaFon, a Russian mobile phone operator
- Das Megaphon, an Austrian street newspaper
