= Streptomyces bellus =

Scientific classification
- Domain: Bacteria
- Kingdom: Bacillati
- Phylum: Actinomycetota
- Class: Actinomycetes
- Order: Streptomycetales
- Family: Streptomycetaceae
- Genus: Streptomyces
- Species: S. bellus

Binomial name
- Streptomyces bellus Margalith and Beretta 1960

Type strain
- A/870, A106, AS 4.1376, ATCC 14925, ATCC 23886, BCRC 13783, CBS 666.68, CCRC 13783, CGMCC 4.1376, DSM 40185, ETH 28547, ETH 28548, ICMP 954, IFO 12844, IMET 42062, ISP 5185, JCM 4292, JCM 4625, KCC S-0292, KCC S-0625, KCCS-0292, KCCS-0625, Lepetit A/870, LMG 19401, NBRC 12844, NCIB 9818, NCIMB 9818, NRRL B-2575, NRRL-ISP 5185, NZRCC 10326, PCM 2314, R-8774, RIA 1139, RIA 569, VKM Ac-573

Species of bacterium

Streptomyces bellus is a bacterium species from the genus of Streptomyces which has been isolated from soil. Streptomyces bellus produces althiomycin.

== See also ==
- List of Streptomyces species
