= Aniba ferrea =

Conservation status
- Endangered (IUCN 3.1)

Scientific classification
- Kingdom: Plantae
- Clade: Tracheophytes
- Clade: Angiosperms
- Clade: Magnoliids
- Order: Laurales
- Family: Lauraceae
- Genus: Aniba
- Species: A. ferrea

Binomial name
- Aniba ferrea Kubitzki

Species of flowering plant

Aniba ferrea is a species of flowering plant in the family Lauraceae. It is a tree endemic to Amazonas state in northern Brazil.
