= Aniba ferruginea =

Conservation status
- Least Concern (IUCN 3.1)

Scientific classification
- Kingdom: Plantae
- Clade: Tracheophytes
- Clade: Angiosperms
- Clade: Magnoliids
- Order: Laurales
- Family: Lauraceae
- Genus: Aniba
- Species: A. ferruginea

Binomial name
- Aniba ferruginea Kubitzki

Species of flowering plant

Aniba ferruginea is a species of plant in the family Lauraceae. It is endemic to Venezuela.
