= Streptomyces griseorubens =

Scientific classification
- Domain: Bacteria
- Kingdom: Bacillati
- Phylum: Actinomycetota
- Class: Actinomycetes
- Order: Streptomycetales
- Family: Streptomycetaceae
- Genus: Streptomyces
- Species: S. griseorubens

Binomial name
- Streptomyces griseorubens (Preobrazhenskaya et al. 1957) Pridham et al. 1958 (Approved Lists 1980)

Type strain
- ATCC 19767, ATCC 19909, BCRC 12104, CBS 505.68, CCRC 12104, DSM 40160, ETH 24199, IFO 12780, IFP 12780, INA 6124/54, ISP 5160, JCM 4383, KCC S-0383, KCCS-0383, NBRC 12780, NCIB 9846, NCIMB 9846, NRRLT, NRRL B-3982, NRRL-ISP 5160, RIA 1047, UNIQEM 153, VKM Ac-1894

Synonyms
- "Actinomyces griseorubens" Preobrazhenskaya et al. 1957; Streptomyces althioticus Yamaguchi et al. 1957 (Approved Lists 1980); Streptomyces matensis Margalith et al. 1959 (Approved Lists 1980)

Species of bacterium

Streptomyces griseorubens is a bacterium species from the genus of Streptomyces which has been isolated from soil. Streptomyces griseorubens produces althiomycin. Streptomyces griseorubens produces matamycin and althiomycin.

== See also ==
- List of Streptomyces species
