= Aniba vaupesiana =

Conservation status
- Least Concern (IUCN 3.1)

Scientific classification
- Kingdom: Plantae
- Clade: Tracheophytes
- Clade: Angiosperms
- Clade: Magnoliids
- Order: Laurales
- Family: Lauraceae
- Genus: Aniba
- Species: A. vaupesiana

Binomial name
- Aniba vaupesiana Kubitzki

Species of flowering plant

Aniba vaupesiana is a species of flowering plant in the family Lauraceae. It is a tree endemic to Colombia.
