= Aniba robusta =

Conservation status
- Least Concern (IUCN 3.1)

Scientific classification
- Kingdom: Plantae
- Clade: Tracheophytes
- Clade: Angiosperms
- Clade: Magnoliids
- Order: Laurales
- Family: Lauraceae
- Genus: Aniba
- Species: A. robusta

Binomial name
- Aniba robusta (Klotzsch & H.Karst. ex Meisn.) Mez

Synonyms
- Aniba cicatricosa C.K.Allen; Aydendron robustum Klotzsch & H.Karst. ex Meisn.

Species of flowering plant

Aniba robusta is a species of flowering plant in the family Lauraceae. It is a tree native to Colombia, Ecuador, Peru, and Venezuela.
