= Aniba percoriacea =

Conservation status
- Vulnerable (IUCN 3.1)

Scientific classification
- Kingdom: Plantae
- Clade: Tracheophytes
- Clade: Angiosperms
- Clade: Magnoliids
- Order: Laurales
- Family: Lauraceae
- Genus: Aniba
- Species: A. percoriacea

Binomial name
- Aniba percoriacea C.K.Allen

Species of flowering plant

Aniba percoriacea is a species of flowering plant in the family Lauraceae. It is endemic to Tafelberg in Suriname.
