= Housane =

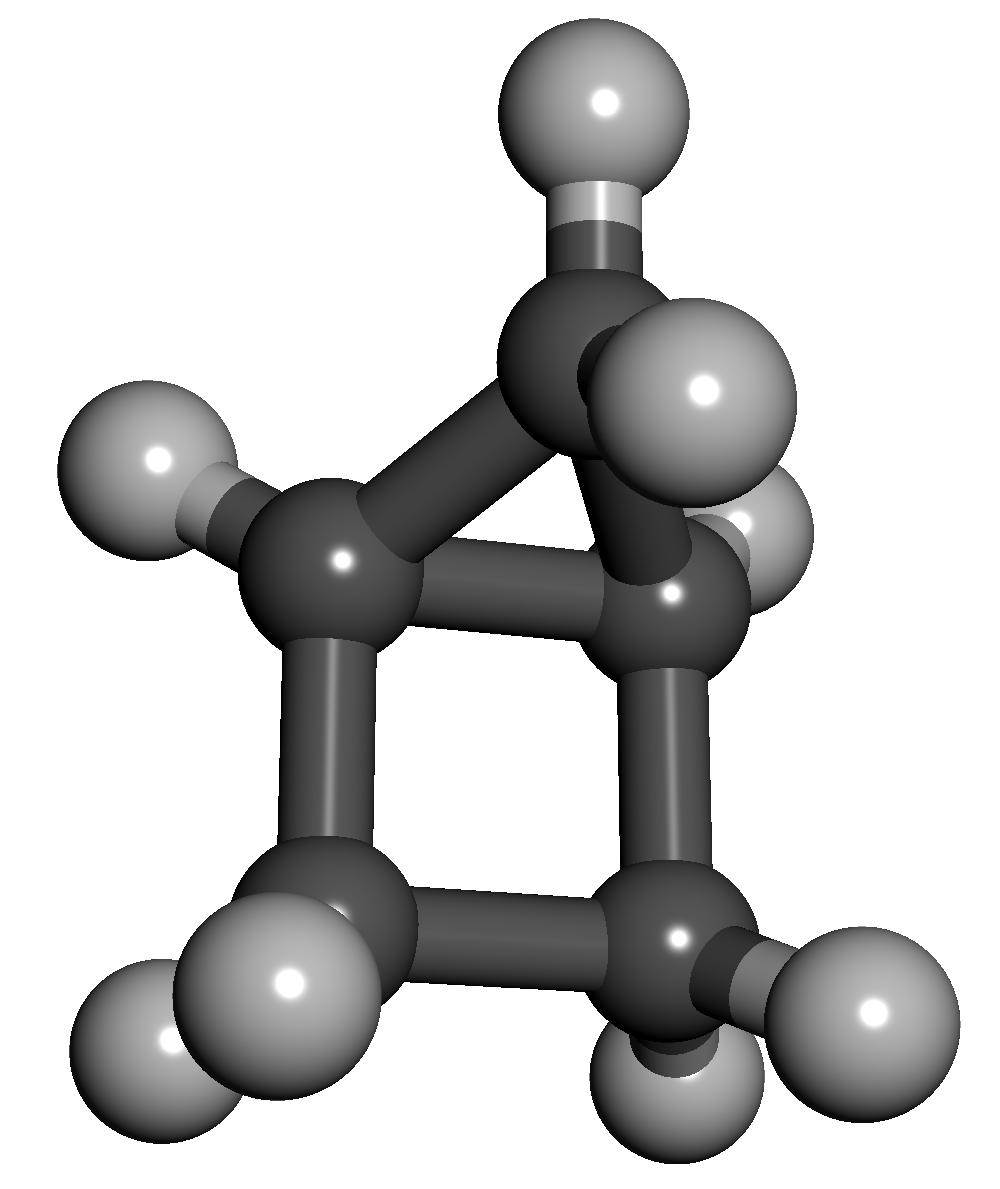

Names
- Preferred IUPAC name Bicyclo[2.1.0]pentane

Identifiers
CAS Number	185-94-4
3D model (JSmol)	Interactive image
Beilstein Reference	2035817
ChEBI	CHEBI:49287
ChemSpider	8747
PubChem CID	9101
UNII	WAV92PJQ5F
CompTox Dashboard (EPA)	DTXSID90870491
- InChI: InChI=1S/C5H8/c1-2-5-3-4(1)5/h4-5H,1-3H2 Key: MHLPKAGDPWUOOT-UHFFFAOYSA-N; InChI=1/C5H8/c1-2-5-3-4(1)5/h4-5H,1-3H2 Key: MHLPKAGDPWUOOT-UHFFFAOYAN
- SMILES: C1C2CCC12

Properties
Chemical formula	C_{5}H_{8}
Molar mass	68.119 g·mol^{−1}
Appearance	colorless liquid
Boiling point	45.5 °C
- Except where otherwise noted, data are given for materials in their standard state (at 25 °C [77 °F], 100 kPa). Infobox references

Housane or bicyclo[2.1.0]pentane is a saturated cycloalkane with the formula C_{5}H_{8}. It is a colorless, volatile liquid at room temperature. It was named "housane" because of its shape, which resembles a simple drawing of a house. Structurally, the molecule consists of cyclopropane fused to cyclobutane. The synthesis of molecules containing multiple strained rings, such as housane, is a traditional endeavor in synthetic organic chemistry.

== Preparation ==
The first synthesis of housane was reported by Criegee in 1957, where housane was obtained from the pyrolysis of 2,3-diazabicyclo[2.2.1]hept-2-ene.

Housane can be prepared in several steps starting with cyclopentadiene. Other methods include photolysis of 2,3-diazabicyclo[2.2.1]hept-2-ene, pyrolysis of N-Phenyl-2-oxo-3-azabicyclo[2.2.1]heptane, and addition of methylene to cyclobutene.

== Structure and properties ==
- The two rings are fused in a cis configuration—this meso compound formally has (1R,4S) absolute stereochemistry. The small size of the two rings prevents the trans isomer from existing, so the stereochemistry is not usually mentioned when discussing this structure.

Housane is easily attacked by bromine or iodine. In the presence of a platinum catalyst at room temperature, it is hydrogenated into cyclopentane. Reaction with hydrogen bromide at lower temperatures affords bromocyclopentane. Housane also reacts with lead tetraacetate, forming cis-1,3-diacetoxycyclopentane among other products.

Housane is thermally quite stable, isomerizing to cyclopentene at 330 °C.

== See also ==
- List of chemical compounds with unusual names
