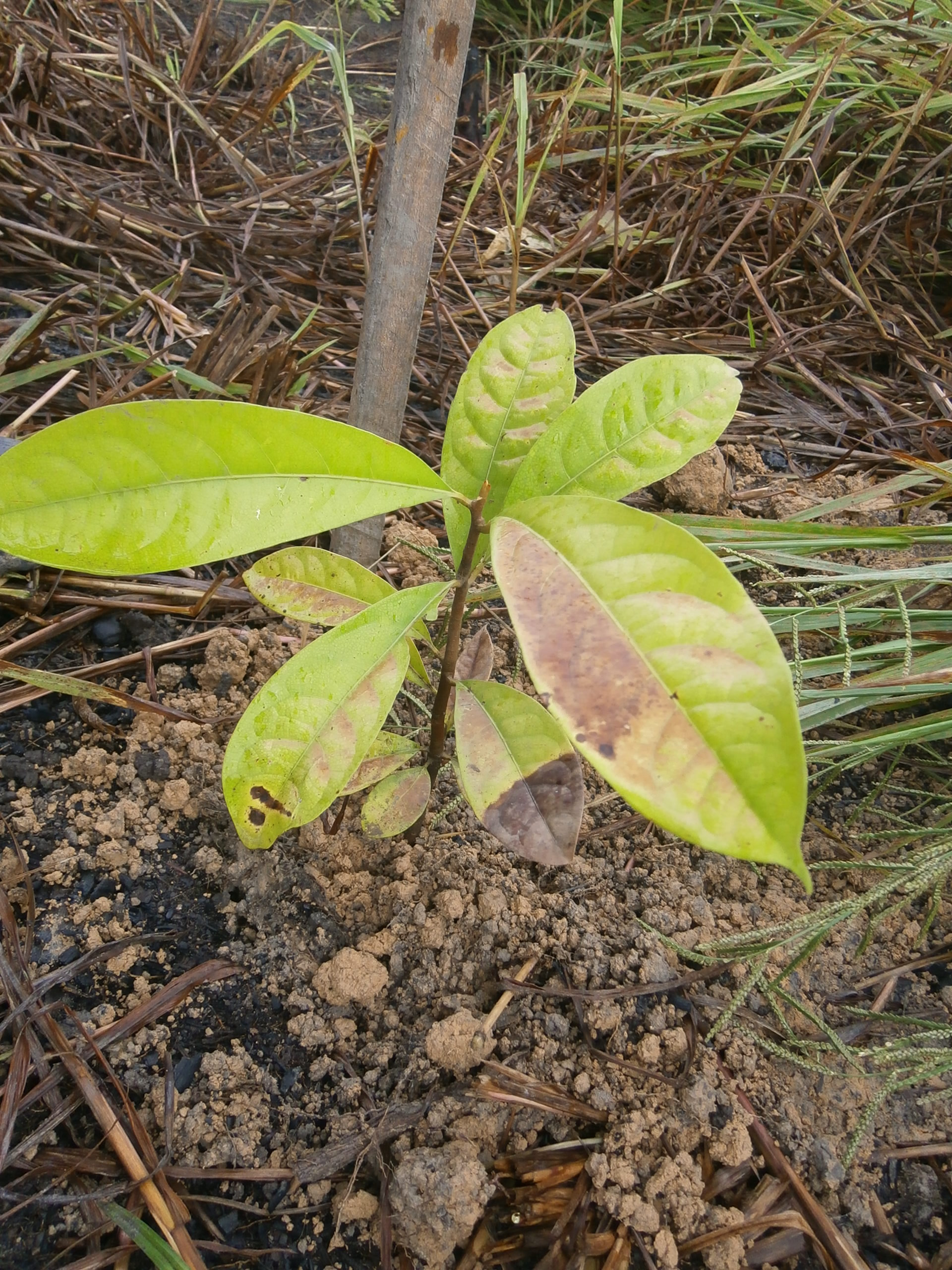

Scientific classification
- Kingdom: Plantae
- Clade: Tracheophytes
- Clade: Angiosperms
- Clade: Magnoliids
- Order: Laurales
- Family: Lauraceae
- Genus: Aniba; Aubl.

Species
- See text

Synonyms
- Aydendron Nees; Cedrota Schreb.; Schauera Nees

= Aniba =

Genus of flowering plants

Aniba is an American neotropical flowering plant genus in the family Lauraceae. They are present in low and mountain cloud forest in Caribbean islands, Central America, and northern to central South America.

== Description ==
They are shrubs or trees up to 25 m high, hermaphrodites. The leaves are alternate, entire, and elliptical or narrowly elliptical. The inflorescences are paniculate and axillary, the flowers are arranged in cymes essentially, and those strictly opposite side are small. The fruit is a berry-like drupe dispersed mostly by birds. Fruits are 3 cm long and 1.5 cm wide, with deep domes, and warty. Many species have a valuable timber in yellow wood, others have the wood and bark pleasantly scented. The oils extracted from certain species are used as ingredients in the manufacture of perfumes.

== Ecology ==
Aniba is a genus of great ecological importance. It currently includes 57 species, classified into six different subgroups, in which the woody structures are almost undifferentiated; the differences are ecological adaptations to different environments over a relatively dry-wet climate. Species in less humid environments are smaller or less robust, with less abundant and thinner foliage and have oleifera cells that give trees a more fragrant aroma.

Found throughout the Guyanas and the Amazon region, and also in the Pacific coastal areas of Colombia, they grow mostly in tropical forests and Andean cloud forest, but have also been found in stubbles and pastures. Distribution of Aniba extends from the islands of the Antilles in the Caribbean to Central America, Nicaragua, Costa Rica, the Guyanas, Venezuela, Colombia, and Peru in the coastal ranges and interior in wet areas, the Andes, and to dry regions of central and southern Brazil.

They do not form large stands, but rather small groups of trees with densities up to one individual per five hectares. Due to the low density, exploitation of the natural populations is to the detriment of the rainforest. Overexploitation of the easily accessible trees of the rainforest has been reducing exports since the mid-1990s. Due to the distribution in inaccessible rainforest regions and its low density, it is hard to survey population trends in figures, but overexploitation is evident.

Fourteen of the most known trees are used by the timber industry. In general, the wood from Aniba species has a high commercial value. The woods are typically yellowish with a greenish hue when fresh, becoming brown or olive on exposure to air. Narrow sapwood is light yellowish. Luster is medium to high; grain is straight to interlocked; texture is fine to medium; they have a spicy odor, and the taste may be distinctive.

== Species ==
As of September 2026, the following 57 species are accepted by Plants of the World Online:

- Aniba affinis (Meisn.) Mez
- Aniba alleniae Soler-Umbarila, Zapata-Corr. & Parra-Os.
- Aniba bracteata (Nees) Mez
- Aniba brochidodroma van der Werff
- Aniba burchellii Kosterm.
- Aniba canelilla (Kunth) Mez
- Aniba cinnamomiflora C.K.Allen
- Aniba citrifolia (Nees) Mez
- Aniba coto (Rusby) Kosterm.
- Aniba cylindriflora Kosterm.
- Aniba desertorum (Nees) Mez
- Aniba ecuadorica Cornejo & Loor
- Aniba excelsa Kosterm.
- Aniba ferrea Kubitzki
- Aniba ferruginea Kubitzki
- Aniba firmula (Nees & Mart.) Mez
- Aniba glabra van der Werff
- Aniba guianensis Aubl.
- Aniba heringeri Vattimo-Gil
- Aniba heterotepala van der Werff
- Aniba hostmanniana (Nees) Mez
- Aniba hypoglauca Sandwith
- Aniba inaequabilis Da Matta
- Aniba intermedia (Meisn.) Mez
- Aniba jenmanii Mez
- Aniba kappleri Mez
- Aniba lancifolia Kubitzki & W.A.Rodrigues
- Aniba magnifica W.Palacios
- Aniba megaphylla Mez
- Aniba muca (Ruiz & Pav.) Mez
- Aniba novogranatensis Kubitzki
- Aniba palaciosii van der Werff
- Aniba panurensis (Meisn.) Mez
- Aniba parviflora (Meisn.) Mez
- Aniba pedicellata Kosterm.
- Aniba percoriacea C.K.Allen
- Aniba permollis (Nees) Mez
- Aniba perutilis Hemsl.
- Aniba pilosa van der Werff
- Aniba puchury-minor (Mart.) Mez
- Aniba ramageana Mez
- Aniba riparia (Nees) Mez
- Aniba robusta (Klotzsch & H.Karst. ex Meisn.) Mez
- Aniba rosodora Ducke
- Aniba santalodora Ducke
- Aniba subbullata H.Ribeiro & P.L.R.Moraes
- Aniba sulcata Benoist
- Aniba taftii van der Werff
- Aniba taubertiana Mez
- Aniba terminalis Ducke
- Aniba tomentella van der Werff
- Aniba vaupesiana Kubitzki
- Aniba venezuelana Mez
- Aniba verticillata van der Werff
- Aniba viridis Mez
- Aniba vulcanicola van der Werff
- Aniba williamsii O.C.Schmidt
