= Aniba intermedia =

Conservation status
- Least Concern (IUCN 3.1)

Scientific classification
- Kingdom: Plantae
- Clade: Tracheophytes
- Clade: Angiosperms
- Clade: Magnoliids
- Order: Laurales
- Family: Lauraceae
- Genus: Aniba
- Species: A. intermedia

Binomial name
- Aniba intermedia (Meisn.) Mez

Synonyms
- Aniba puchury-minor var. intermedia (Meisn.) Kosterm.; Aydendron intermedium Meisn.

Species of flowering plant

Aniba intermedia is a species of flowering plant in the family Lauraceae. It is a tree endemic to northern and eastern Brazil. It grows in lowland tropical evergreen, semi-deciduous, and restinga moist forests.

The species was first described as Aydendron intermedium by Carl Meissner in 1864. In 1889 Carl Christian Mez placed the species in genus Aniba as A. intermedia.
