= Aniba venezuelana =

Conservation status
- Least Concern (IUCN 3.1)

Scientific classification
- Kingdom: Plantae
- Clade: Tracheophytes
- Clade: Angiosperms
- Clade: Magnoliids
- Order: Laurales
- Family: Lauraceae
- Genus: Aniba
- Species: A. venezuelana

Binomial name
- Aniba venezuelana Mez

Species of flowering plant

Aniba venezuelana is a species of plant in the family Lauraceae. It is a tree native to Colombia (Chocó Department), Costa Rica, southern Nicaragua, and Venezuela.
