= Aniba novogranatensis =

Conservation status
- Critically Endangered (IUCN 3.1)

Scientific classification
- Kingdom: Plantae
- Clade: Tracheophytes
- Clade: Angiosperms
- Clade: Magnoliids
- Order: Laurales
- Family: Lauraceae
- Genus: Aniba
- Species: A. novogranatensis

Binomial name
- Aniba novogranatensis Kubitzki

Species of flowering plant

Aniba novogranatensis is a species of plant in the family Lauraceae. It is endemic to Colombia.

== Etymology ==
The specific epithet novogranatensis is a demonym for Colombia, formerly called Nueva Granada.
