= Aniba pedicellata =

Conservation status
- Critically Endangered (IUCN 2.3)

Scientific classification
- Kingdom: Plantae
- Clade: Tracheophytes
- Clade: Angiosperms
- Clade: Magnoliids
- Order: Laurales
- Family: Lauraceae
- Genus: Aniba
- Species: A. pedicellata

Binomial name
- Aniba pedicellata Kosterm.

Species of flowering plant

Aniba pedicellata is a species of flowering plant in the family Lauraceae. It is a tree endemic to Rio de Janeiro state in southeastern Brazil.

The species was first described by André Joseph Guillaume Henri Kostermans in 1938.
