= Aniba megaphylla =

Conservation status
- Least Concern (IUCN 3.1)

Scientific classification
- Kingdom: Plantae
- Clade: Tracheophytes
- Clade: Angiosperms
- Clade: Magnoliids
- Order: Laurales
- Family: Lauraceae
- Genus: Aniba
- Species: A. megaphylla

Binomial name
- Aniba megaphylla Mez

Synonyms
- Aniba anisosepala Sandwith; Aniba koumaroucapa Kosterm.

Species of tree

Aniba megaphylla is a species of tree in the family Lauraceae which is native to tropical South America. It is native to Bolivia, northern Brazil, Colombia, Ecuador, French Guiana, Guyana, Peru, Suriname, and Venezuela, growing primarily in wet tropical biomes. This species produces the cytotoxic lignan megaphone.
