= Retained name =

Unsystematic chemical nomenclature

In chemistry, a retained name is an established name for a chemical compound that is recommended for use by a system of chemical nomenclature (for example, IUPAC nomenclature), but that is not exactly, or not at all, systematic. Retained names are often used for the most fundamental parts of a nomenclature system: almost all the chemical elements have retained names rather than being named systematically, as do the first four alkanes, benzene and most simple heterocyclic compounds. Traditional names such as water and ammonia are other examples.

Retained names may be either semisystematic or completely trivial; that is, they may contain certain elements of systematic nomenclature or none at all. Glycerol and acetic acid are examples of retained semisystematic names; furan and anisole are examples of retained trivial names.
