= PEPPSI =

Group of chemical compounds

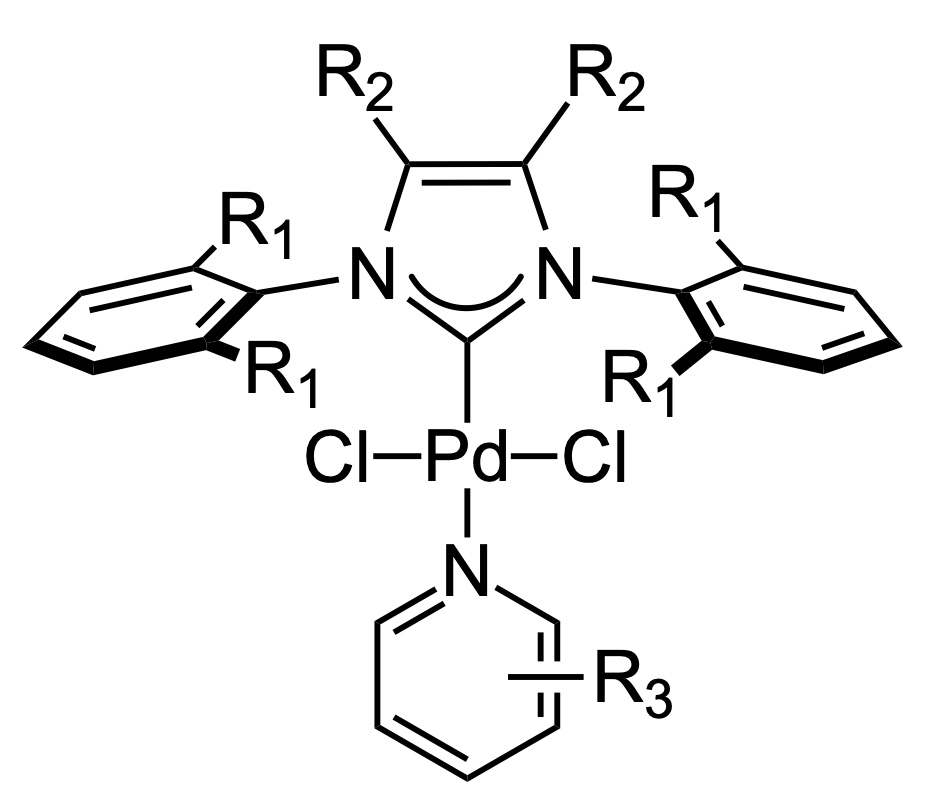
A schematic of a generic Pd-PEPPSI type precatalyst. R_{1}, R_{2}, and R_{3} represent carbon or heteroatom substituents.

PEPPSI refers to a family of palladium catalysts for various cross-coupling reactions. In comparison to other palladium-based catalysts, Pd-PEPPSI-type complexes are stable to air and moisture and are relatively easy to synthesize and handle.

== Structure and synthesis ==
In terms of its structure, Pd-PEPPSI is a Pd(II) complex in the expected square planar geometry. The chloride ligands are mutually trans. The coordination sphere is completed with the chloropyridine and NHC ligands. The NHC can be fitted with methyl (CH_{3}, Me), ethyl (C_{2}H_{5}, Et), isopropyl (C_{3}H_{7}, ^{i}Pr), isopentyl (C_{5}H_{11}, ^{i}Pent), or isoheptyl (C_{7}H_{15}, ^{i}Hept) group, and starting from the second in the row the resulting catalysts are thus labeled as PEPPSI-IEt, PEPPSI-IPr, PEPPSI-IPent, and PEPPSI-IHept respectively, with or without "Pd-" added in front. Commonly used PEPPSI catalysts such as Pd-PEPPSI-IPr contain an unsubstituted imidazole core (R_{2}=H) and a 3-chloro substituted pyridine ligand (R_{3}=3-Cl). However, structural modifications of the imidazole backbone and pyridine ligand can profoundly affect the catalytic activity of these complexes.

As developed by Organ and co-workers at York University, PEPPSI catalysts are prepared by treating an imidazolium salt, palladium(II) chloride, and potassium carbonate in 3-chloropyridine as a solvent. and moisture. Even heating in dimethyl sulfoxide at 120 °C for hours does not result in significant decomposition or deactivation of PEPPSI catalysts.

=== iPEPPSI ===
Examples of abnormal NHCs based on the mesoionic 1,2,3-triazol-5-ylidene structure have been used for palladium catalysis. In this manner, pyridine fused tzNHCs were prepared to yield palladium complexes with pyridine attached to the carbene core. With this ligand, air stable and highly active palladium complexes of iPEPPSI (as in internal PEPPSI) were synthesized.

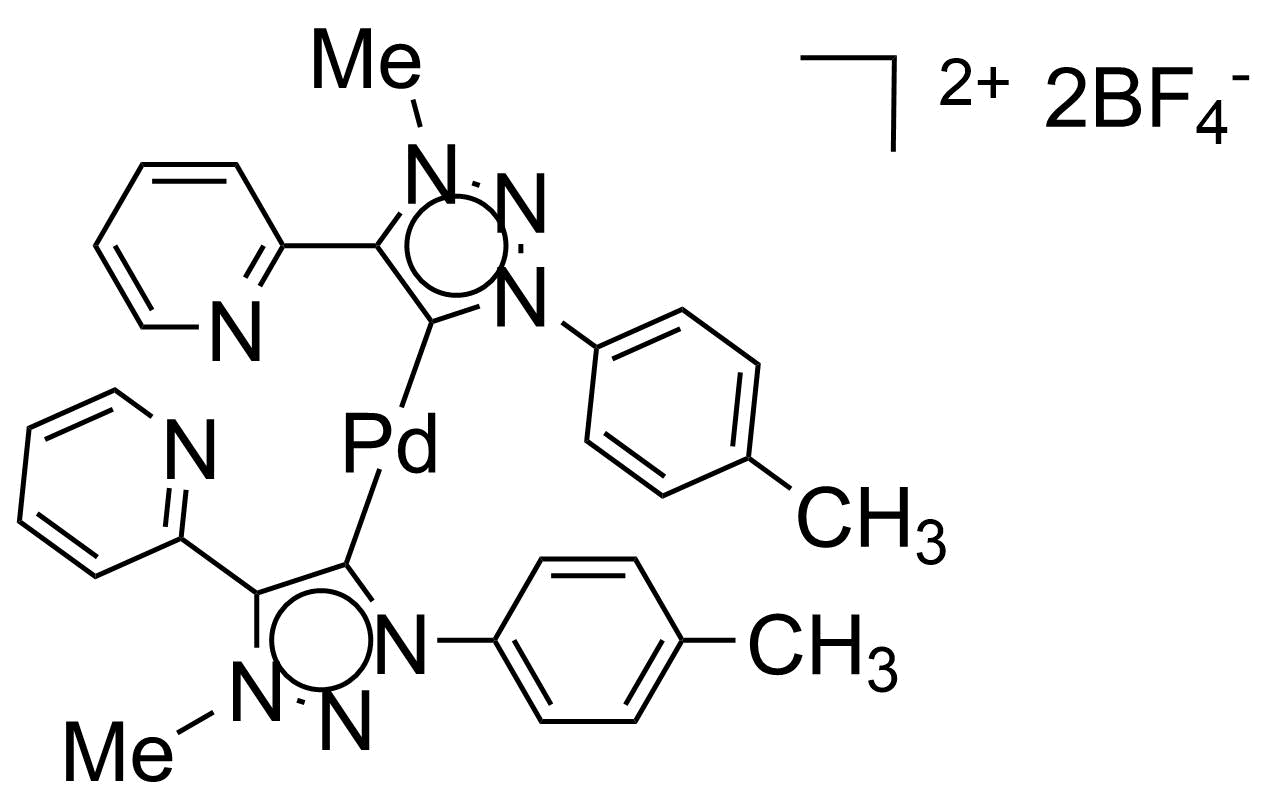
An example of iPEPPSI complex.

== Properties and reactions ==
PEPPSI catalyze various cross-coupling reactions including Negishi coupling, Suzuki coupling, Sonogashira coupling, Kumada coupling, and the Buchwald–Hartwig amination as well as aryl sulfination and the Heck reaction. In Negishi coupling, PEPPSI promotes reaction of alkyl halides, aryl halides or alkyl sulfonates with alkylzinc halides, and the important advantage of PEPPSI over alternative catalysts is that the reaction can be carried out in a general chemical laboratory, without a glove box. PEPPSI contains palladium in the +2 oxidation state and is thus a "precatalyst", that is the metal must be reduced to the active Pd(0) form in order to enter the cross-coupling catalytic cycle. This is usually achieved in situ in the presence of active transmetalating agents such as organo-magnesium, -zinc, -tin, or -boron reagents. Once activated, the NHC-Pd(0) species becomes rather air-sensitive.

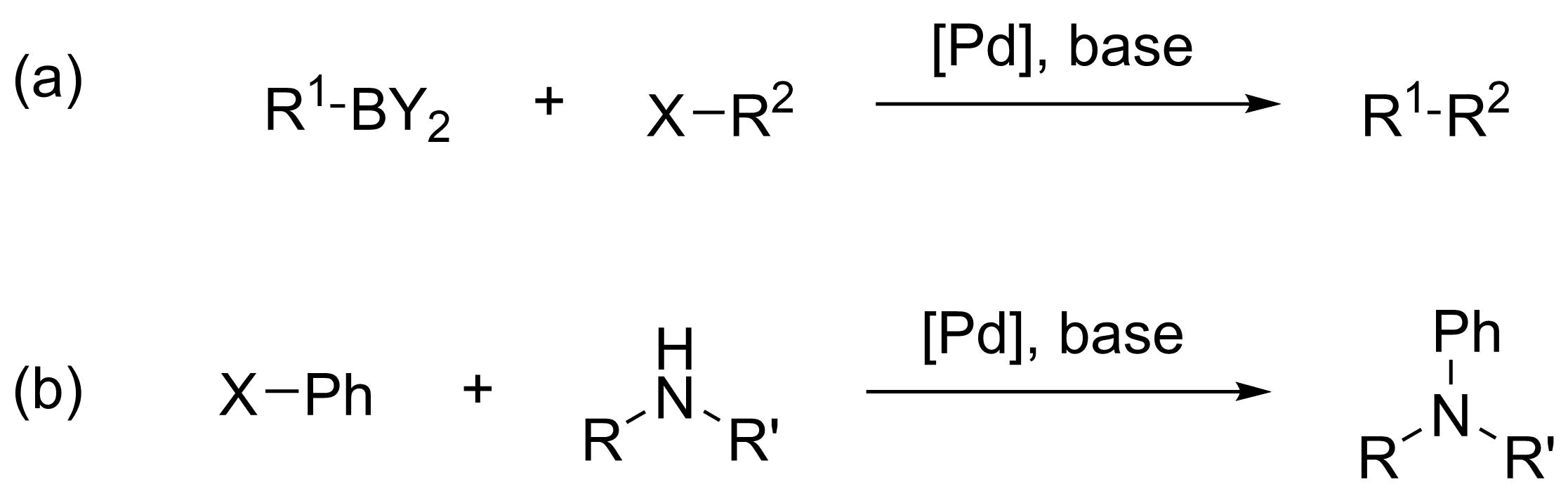
Suzuki coupling (a) and Buchwald-Hartwig reaction (b) can be activated by PEPPSI complexes.

iPEPPSI (internal PEPPSI) type catalyse the copper-free Sonogashira reaction in aqueous solution.

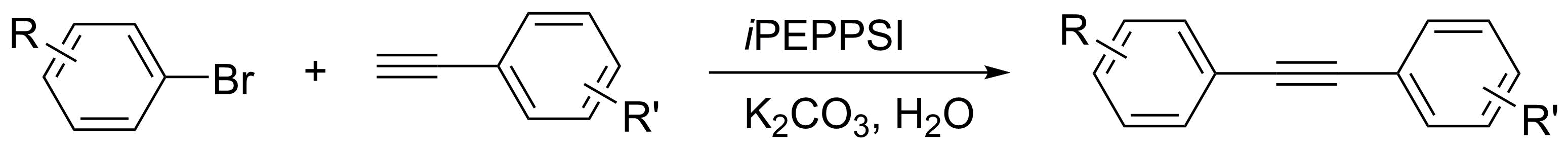
Sonogashira coupling under green reaction conditions using iPEPPSI.

Additionally, the cationic palladium iPEPPSI complex shown above was used in the hydroamination of alkynes as well.

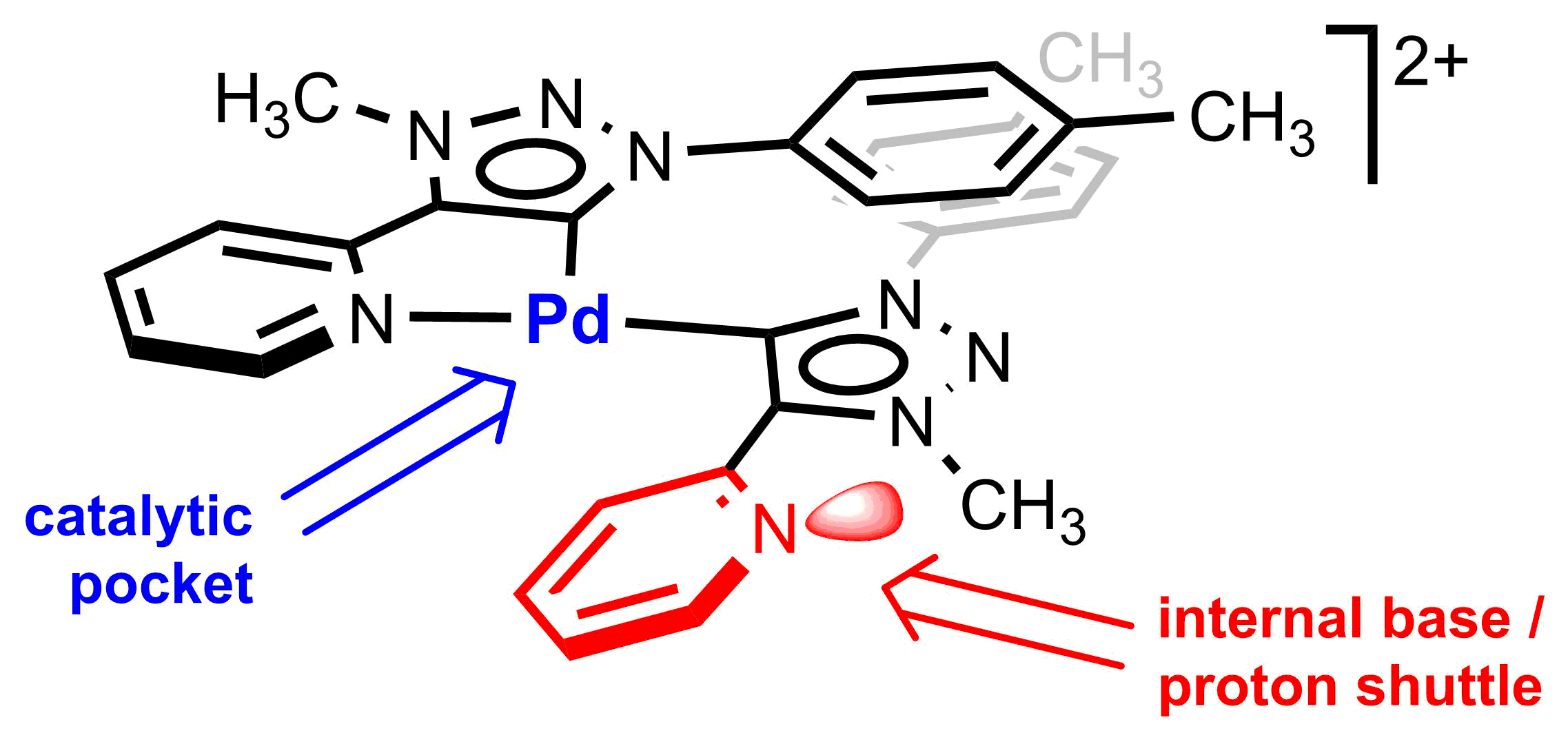
Palladium iPEPPSI complex with designated catalytic region and pyridine wingtip that actively participates in the catalytic reactions as internal base.
