= Volleyballene =

Structure of Volleyballene. It is composed of 20 Sc atoms and 60 C atoms.

Volleyballene is a hypothetical chemical compound that is a new type of 3D hollow molecule composed of carbon and transition metals. The name is a reference to fullerenes. The main feature of these substances is that metal atoms are part of the framework and they are not deposited on the surface of the molecule. The incorporation of the metal atoms avoids their clustering and confers to volleyballene sites to attach hydrogen. Volleyballene was predicted in 2016 by Jing Wang et al. A further study based on Density functional Theory (DFT) carried out by Tlahuice-Flores in the same year supports the predicted structure and gives computed Infrared, Raman and UV spectra for its experimental detection. The structure is described as one Sc_{8} cluster holding 12 scandium atoms linked to six C_{10} units on each face. The chemical formula C_{60}Sc_{20} is closely related to C_{80} fullerene and it has a large predicted HOMO–LUMO gap of 1.47 eV. Further hydrogenation of volleyballene is predicted to give a 70-H structure with an adsorption energy of circa −0.11 eV/H2. Moreover, it is expected that the adsorption-desorption reaction can be reached at ambient temperature. Potential use of volleyballenes is hydrogen storage even at ambient conditions.
