= Systematic name =

Name given in a systematic way to one unique group

A systematic name is a name given in a systematic way to one unique group, organism, object or chemical substance, out of a specific population or collection. Systematic names are usually part of a nomenclature.

A semisystematic name or semitrivial name is a name that has at least one systematic part and at least one trivial part, such as a chemical vernacular name.

Creating systematic names can be as simple as assigning a prefix or a number to each object (in which case they are a type of numbering scheme), or as complex as encoding the complete structure of the object in the name. Many systems combine some information about the named object with an extra sequence number to make it into a unique identifier.

Systematic names often co-exist with earlier common names assigned before the creation of any systematic naming system. For example, many common chemicals are still referred to by their common or trivial names, even by chemists.

== In chemistry ==
In chemistry, a systematic name describes the chemical structure of a chemical substance, thus giving some information about its chemical properties.

The Compendium of Chemical Terminology published by the IUPAC defines systematic name as "a name composed wholly of specially coined or selected syllables, with or without numerical prefixes; e.g. pentane, oxazole." However, when trivial names have become part of chemical nomenclature, they can be the systematic name of a substance or part of it. Examples for some systematic names that have trivial origins are benzene (cyclohexatriene) or glycerol (trihydroxypropane).

== Examples ==
There are standardized systematic or semi-systematic names for:

- Chemical elements (following IUPAC guidelines)
- Chemical nomenclature (following IUPAC guidelines)
- Binomial nomenclature, initiated by Carl Linnaeus
- Astronomical objects and entities (administered by the International Astronomical Union)
- Genes (following HUGO Gene Nomenclature Committee procedures)
- Proteins
- Minerals (administered by the IMA)
- Monoclonal antibodies

== See also ==
- Biological classification
- Chemical element
- Chemical compound
- International scientific vocabulary
- List of Latin and Greek words commonly used in systematic names
- Name
- Namespace
- Naming convention
- Numbering scheme
- Retained name
