= Megaphone (molecule) =

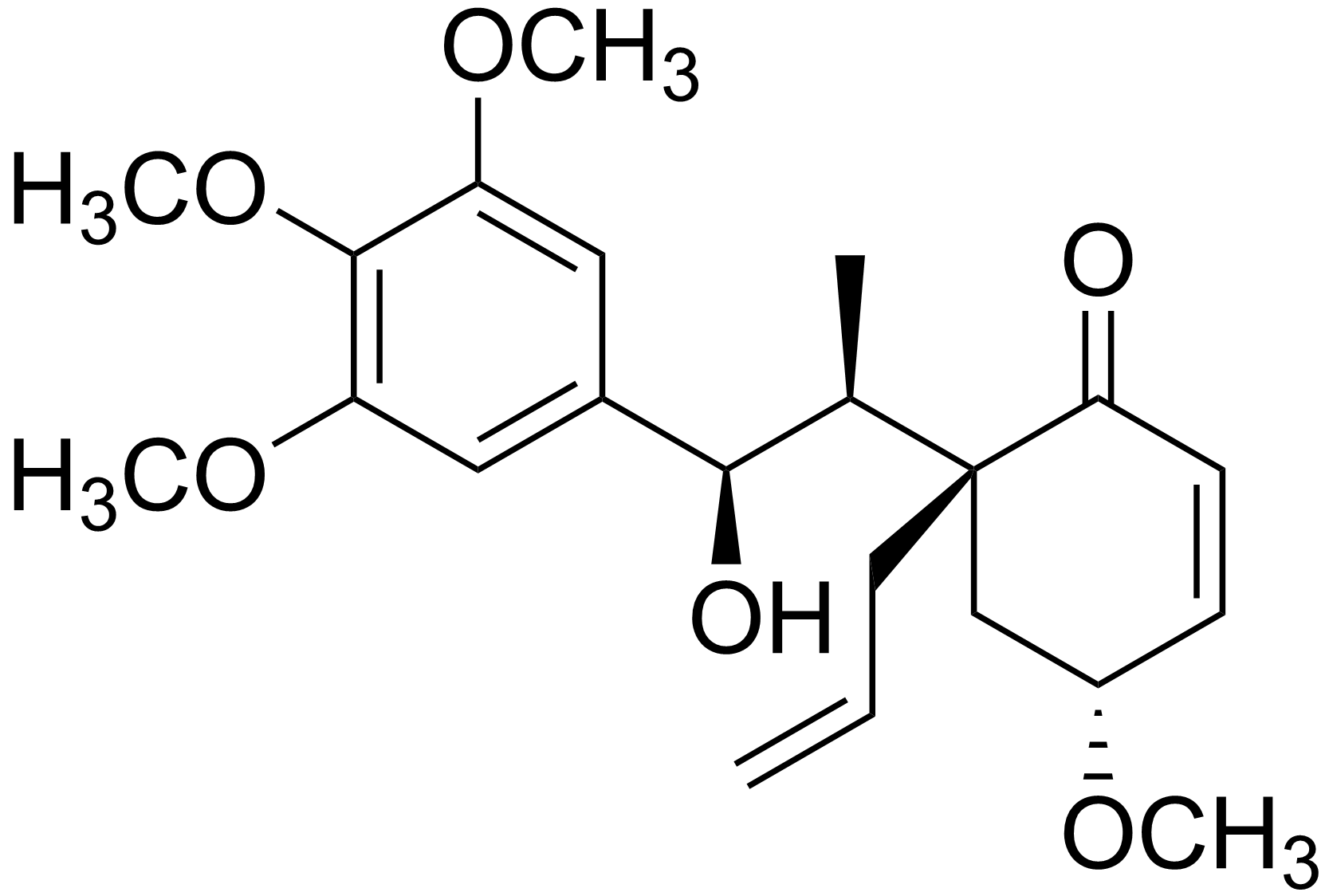
- Chemical structure of megaphone

Names
- IUPAC name (1′R,5′R,7R,8S)-7-Hydroxy-3,4,5,5′-methoxy-5′,6′-dihydro-2′H-8,1′-neolign-8′-en-2′-one
- Systematic IUPAC name (4R,6R)-6-[(1R,2S)-1-Hydroxy-1-(3,4,5-trimethoxyphenyl)propan-2-yl]-4-methoxy-6-(prop-2-en-1-yl)cyclohex-2-en-1-one

Identifiers
| CAS Number | 64332-37-2 |
| 3D model (JSmol) | Interactive image |
| ChemSpider | 391211 |
| PubChem CID | 324150; 442908 |
| UNII | 8J0BV7D5N9 |
| CompTox Dashboard (EPA) | DTXSID80214542 |
- InChI: InChI=1S/C22H30O6/c1-7-10-22(13-16(25-3)8-9-19(22)23)14(2)20(24)15-11-17(26-4)21(28-6)18(12-15)27-5/h7-9,11-12,14,16,20,24H,1,10,13H2,2-6H3/t14-,16+,20-,22-/m1/s1 Key: JCRROBQLLRCCAV-SQKDIAQBSA-N
- SMILES: O=C1C=C[C@H](OC)C[C@]1(CC=C)[C@H](C)[C@@H](O)C2=CC(OC)=C(OC)C(OC)=C2

Properties
| Chemical formula | C_{22}H_{30}O_{6} |
| Molar mass | 390.476 g·mol^{−1} |
| Density | 1.242 g/cm^{3} |
| Melting point | 152 °C (306 °F; 425 K) |
- Except where otherwise noted, data are given for materials in their standard state (at 25 °C [77 °F], 100 kPa). verify (what is ?) Infobox references

Megaphone is a cytotoxic neolignan obtained from Aniba megaphylla, a flowering plant in the laurel family which gave the compound its name. Megaphone has also been prepared synthetically.

Studies carried out in the 1960s demonstrated that an alcoholic extract of the ground root of Aniba megaphylla inhibited, in vitro, growth of cells derived from human carcinoma of the nasopharynx. In 1978, the active components of the extract were isolated using silica gel chromatography, characterized and named as megaphone (C_{22}H_{30}O_{6}, solid), megaphone acetate (C_{24}H_{32}O_{7}, oily liquid) and megaphyllone acetate (C_{23}H_{28}O_{7}, oily liquid). For comparison, megaphone acetate was also produced synthetically by reacting megaphone with acetic anhydride at 50 °C for 6 hours. Stirring an alcoholic solution of megaphone (megaphone acetate), with added palladium catalyst, in hydrogen atmosphere, followed by evaporation of the solvent yields tetrahydromegaphone (tetrahydromegaphone acetate) as an oil. Millimeter-sized crystals of megaphone can be grown from an ether-chloroform solution. They have monoclinic symmetry with space group P2_{1}, lattice constants a = 0.8757 nm, b = 1.1942 nm and c = 1.0177 nm and two formula units per unit cell. Megaphone and megaphone acetate molecules are chiral and the reported extraction and synthesis procedures yielded their racemic mixtures. Megaphone acetate was also isolated from the root of Endlicheria dysodantha, another plant of Laurel family, using chromatography of ethanolic solution. It showed inhibitory activity against cells of crown gall tumor and human lung, breast and colon carcinomas.
