= Bohemic acid =

Mixture of chemical compounds

Bohemic acid is a mixture of chemical compounds which is obtained through fermentation by actinobacteria species in the genus Actinosporangium (Actinoplanaceae). The name honors the Puccini opera La Bohème and many individual components of the acid carry the names of characters from La Bohème. Most of those components are antitumor agents and anthracycline antibiotics active against Gram-positive bacteria.

== Synthesis and fractions ==
Bohemic acid is produced through fermentation by an actinobacteria species in the genus Actinosporangium (Actinoplanaceae) in the order Actinomycetales. Specifically, strain C36145 (ATCC 31127) produces bohemic acid. The acid can be extracted from the fermentation broth with methyl isobutyl ketone under neutral or slightly basic pH conditions, and the fats and oils are removed by washing with petroleum ether.

Chromatographical separation, in addition to the antibiotics pyrromycin and cinerubin A and B, reveals several individual components of bohemic acid, including alcindoromycin, bohemamine, collinemycin, marcellomycin, mimimycin, musettamycin, rudolphomycin and schaunardimycin. Their names originate from the characters Alcindoro, Colline, Marcello, Mimì, Musetta, Rodolfo (Rudolph) and Schaunard of the Puccini opera La Bohème, and the acid itself and the bohemamine component carry the name of the opera. The suffix -mycin is conventionally added to indicate antibiotics derived from actinobacteria or fungi.

== Properties ==
The individual components of bohemic acid are orange-red solids, the color originating from an optical absorption band centered at about 490 nm. Marcellomycin and mimimycin, and collinemycin and musettamycin are stereoisomers, that is they have the same chemical compositions; however, one C-H and one COOCH_{3} group exchange places. Those two groups are attached to the same carbon atom of one carbon ring, they are marked by the blue star in their structure in the table (C-H group is not shown). Nearly all components of bohemic acid are anthracycline antibiotic agents active against Gram-positive bacteria, but not against Gram-negative bacteria, yeasts or fungi. The most potent component of the acid is rudolphomycin and the least potent is schaunardimycin, which is about 10 times weaker than musettamycin and 20 times weaker than marcellomycin. The original studies on the individual components of bohemic acid have tested them all for antitumor activity in mice, upon intraperitoneal injection. Furthermore, the antitumor pharmacokinetics of marcellomycin in the human blood has been evaluated both in vitro and in vivo.

The median lethal dose (LD_{50}) of marcellomycin depends strongly on the animal and varies from a few mg/kg of body weight (dogs) to 20 mg/kg (Suiss-Webster mice, intravenal injection), the major site of toxicity being the gastrointestinal tract. Bohemamine has several structural varieties and derivatives, such as bohemamine B (C_{14}H_{20}N_{2}O_{3}), bohemamine C (C_{14}H_{21}N_{2}O_{3}), and 5-chlorobohemamine C (C_{14}H_{20Cl}N_{2}O_{3}). None of them showed antibiotic, antifungal or antitumor activity.

Some components of bohemic acids
Name	Formula	M.p., °C	CAS number	Structure
Alcindoromycin	C_{41}H_{53}NO_{17}	150	72586-21-1	
Bohemamine	C_{14}H_{18}N_{2}O_{3}	200	72926-12-6	
Collinemycin	C_{36}H_{45}NO_{14}	140	72598-49-3	
Marcellomycin	C_{42}H_{55}NO_{17}	175	63710-10-1	
Mimimycin	C_{42}H_{55}NO_{17}	155	72657-06-8	
Musettamycin	C_{36}H_{45}NO_{14}	160	63710-09-8	
Rudolphomycin	C_{42}H_{52}N_{2}O_{16}	170	69245-38-1	
Schaunardimycin	C_{35}H_{43}NO_{14}		93423-02-0	

The bottom fragment of rudolphomycin is a cyclic (sugar) compound with a chemical formula C_{6}H_{8}NO_{3} and a proposed trivial name rednose.
