= Althiomycin =

Names
- IUPAC name N-[2-Hydroxy-1-[4-(3-methoxy-5-oxo-2H-pyrrole-1-carbonyl)-4,5-dihydro-1,3-thiazol-2-yl]ethyl]-2-(nitrosomethylidene)-3H-1,3-thiazole-4-carboxamide
- Other names Altiomycin; Matamycin

Identifiers
CAS Number	12656-40-5
3D model (JSmol)	Interactive image
ChemSpider	4576669
PubChem CID	5464477
- InChI: InChI=1S/C16H17N5O6S2/c1-27-8-2-13(23)21(4-8)16(25)11-7-29-15(20-11)9(5-22)19-14(24)10-6-28-12(18-10)3-17-26/h2-3,6,9,11,18,22H,4-5,7H2,1H3,(H,19,24) Key: NZGOIHZOTAJJCD-UHFFFAOYSA-N
- SMILES: COC1=CC(=O)N(C1)C(=O)[C@H]1CSC(=N1)[C@H](CO)NC(=O)C1=CSC(\C=N\O)=N1

Properties
Chemical formula	C_{16}H_{17}N_{5}O_{6}S_{2}
Molar mass	439.46 g·mol^{−1}
- Except where otherwise noted, data are given for materials in their standard state (at 25 °C [77 °F], 100 kPa). Infobox references

Althiomycin (matamycin) is a thiazole antibiotic, effective against Gram-positive and Gram-negative bacteria. The name matamycin is from "Mata Hari" and the suffix -mycin.

Isolated from Streptomyces matensis, the compound was first described by Margalith et al. in 1959. It acts a protein synthesis inhibitor and its site of action is the 50S subunit of the bacterial ribosome.
