= Johnny Mathis Sings the Music of Bacharach & Kaempfert =

Studio album by Johnny Mathis
- Released: 1970
- Recorded: Sides one and two: October 21–23, 1968 at Studio Hamburg; Hamburg, Germany; Sides three and four: 1959–1960; 1968–1970
- Genre: Vocal; pop/rock
- Length: 64:30
- Label: Columbia
- Producer: Jack Gold; Al Ham; Robert Mersey; Mitch Miller

Johnny Mathis chronology
Close to You (1970)	Johnny Mathis Sings the Music of Bacharach & Kaempfert (1970)	Love Story (1971)

Professional ratings
Review scores
Source	Rating
Billboard	positive
The Encyclopedia of Popular Music	3/5 stars

UK Cover Art for single lp version

Johnny Mathis Sings the Music of Bacharach & Kaempfert is an album by American pop singer Johnny Mathis that was released in the fall of 1970 by Columbia Records. While one half of the two-record set was a compilation of tracks from his previous albums that were composed by Burt Bacharach, the other consisted of new recordings of songs composed by Bert Kaempfert, including a new version of "Strangers in the Night", which Mathis had already recorded in 1966 for his LP Johnny Mathis Sings. Although the Kaempfert tribute was similar to recent Mathis albums in that he was mainly covering songs made popular by other singers, it was absent of hits from the 12 months previous to its release that had become the pattern of his output at this point. The latest US chartings of any of the Kaempfert compositions as of this album's debut came from 1967 recordings of "Lady" by Jack Jones and "The Lady Smiles" by Matt Monro.

The album made its first appearance on Billboard magazine's Top LP's chart in the issue dated January 23, 1971, and reached number 169 during its seven weeks there.

Sides one and two of Kaempfert songs had already been released in the UK as Johnny Mathis Sings the Music of Bert Kaempfert in November 1969.

== Track listing ==
All tracks on sides one and two were recorded October 21–23, 1968.

=== Side one ===
1. "Wonderland by Night" (Lincoln Chase, Klaus-Gunter Neumann) – 3:34
2. "Spanish Eyes" (Bert Kaempfert, Charles Singleton, Eddie Snyder) – 3:00
3. "The Lady Smiles" (Richard Ahlert, Kaempfert, Herbert Rehbein) – 3:06
4. "Danke Schoen" (Milt Gabler, Kaempfert, Kurt Schwabach) – 2:56
5. "The Times Will Change" (Kaempfert, Rehbein, Carl Sigman) – 3:09
6. "Remember When (We Made These Memories)" (Kaempfert, Singleton, Snyder) – 2:58

=== Side two ===
1. "Strangers in the Night" (Kaempfert, Singleton, Snyder) – 3:34
2. "Don't Stay" (Ahlert, Kaempfert, Rehbein) – 2:51
3. "If There's a Way" (Kaempfert, Jimmy Radcliffe, Rehbein, Buddy Scott) – 2:55
4. "Lady" (Kaempfert, Larry Kusik, Rehbein, Singleton) – 3:00
5. "L-O-V-E" (Gabler, Kaempfert) – 2:30

=== Side three ===
1. "Walk On By" (Burt Bacharach, Hal David) – 3:00
2. "The Look of Love" from Casino Royale (Bacharach, David) – 3:41
3. "I Say a Little Prayer" (Bacharach, David) – 2:14
  - above three recorded and released in 1968 for the album Love Is Blue
4. "Heavenly" (Bacharach, Sidney Shaw) – 3:19
  - rec. and rel. in 1959 for the album Heavenly
5. "This Guy's in Love with You" (Bacharach, David) – 4:35
  - rec. and rel. in 1968 for the album Those Were the Days

=== Side four ===
1. "I'll Never Fall in Love Again" from Promises, Promises (Bacharach, David) – 3:00
  - rec. and rel. in 1969 for the album Love Theme from "Romeo And Juliet" (A Time for Us)
2. "Alfie" from Alfie (Bacharach, David) – 3:13
3. "Odds and Ends" (Bacharach, David) – 3:02
  - above two rec. and rel. in 1970 for the album Raindrops Keep Fallin' on My Head
4. "Faithfully" (Bacharach, Shaw) – 2:32
  - rec. and rel. in 1959 for the album Faithfully
5. "Don't Go Breakin' My Heart" (Bacharach, David) – 2:21
  - rec. and rel. in 1968 for the album Love Is Blue

=== Bonus track ===
The 1969 UK LP of Kaempfert songs was released as part of the 2017 box set The Voice of Romance: The Columbia Original Album Collection. Both the UK LP and the box set included a bonus track:

- "It Makes No Difference" (Gabler, Kaempfert, Rehbein) – 2:32

== Personnel ==
- Johnny Mathis – vocals; liner notes
- Robert Mersey – producer (except as noted); arranger and conductor ("Don't Go Breakin' My Heart", "I Say a Little Prayer", "I'll Never Fall in Love Again", "The Look of Love", "Walk On By")
- Jack Gold – producer ("Alfie", "Odds and Ends")
- Mitch Miller – producer ("Faithfully", "Heavenly")
- Al Ham – producer ("Heavenly")
- Herbert Rehbein – arranger and conductor (sides one and two)
- Ernie Freeman – arranger and conductor ("Alfie", "Odds and Ends")
- Glenn Osser – arranger and conductor ("Faithfully", "Heavenly")
- D'Arneill Pershing – arranger and conductor ("This Guy's In Love With You")
- Peter Klemt – engineer (sides one and two)
- Gunther Sorenson – engineer (sides one and two)
- Frank Laico – engineer ("Don't Go Breakin' My Heart", "I Say a Little Prayer", "The Look of Love", "Walk On By")
- Glen Kolotkin – engineer ("Don't Go Breakin' My Heart", "I Say a Little Prayer", "The Look of Love", "Walk On By")
- Phil Macy – engineer ("Alfie", "I'll Never Fall in Love Again", "Odds and Ends")
- Rafael O. Valentin – engineer ("This Guy's In Love With You")
- Bert Kaempfert – liner notes
- R.H.B.K. – liner notes
- Guy Webster – photography
- Anne Blackford – album design
- Special thanks to Bobmar Lord Alvin of Garden, otherwise known as Henry

== Bibliography ==
- Whitburn, Joel (2007), Joel Whitburn Presents Billboard Top Adult Songs, 1961-2006, Record Research Inc., ISBN 978-0898201697
- Whitburn, Joel (2010), Joel Whitburn Presents Top Pop Albums, Seventh Edition, Record Research Inc., ISBN 978-0-89820-183-3
