= Lady (Jack Jones album) =

Studio album by Jack Jones
- Released: March 1967
- Recorded: Late 1966; Early 1967
- Studio: In New York City
- Genre: Vocal pop; Easy listening
- Length: 33 minutes 15 seconds
- Label: Kapp Records (KL 1511; KS 3511)

Jack Jones chronology
Jack Jones Sings (1966)	Lady (1967)	Our Song (1967)

Singles from Lady
- 1. "Lady" Released: January 1967; 2. "Brother Where Are You" Released: February 1968

Lady is the twenty-first studio album by American pop vocalist Jack Jones, released in March 1967 by Kapp Records. The project included a mixture of original and cover songs. The album reached high positions on the US album charts and received a positive reception.

== Background and content ==
Jack Jones was a popular easy listening and pop singer in the 1960s, recording with Kapp Records and gaining several hits. In early 1967 he scored another Billboard Easy Listening chart topper titled "Lady". An album titled after it followed while the single was still on the charts.

The recordings for Lady were taken from sessions held in the winter of 1966 and 1967 in New York City. The songs were arranged and conducted by Marty Paich and Ralph Carmichael. The album consisted of 12 tracks, evenly split on both sides. The project included songs in an easy listening style like "A Beautiful Friendship", and vocal tracks like a cover of Barbra Streisand's "Free Again" from Je m'appelle Barbra. Other selections included "Nice 'N' Easy", which was a hit for Frank Sinatra earlier in the decade, and a Richard Rodgers standard from 1935 titled "It's Easy to Remember".

== Release and reception ==
Professional ratings
Review scores
Source	Rating
The Encyclopedia of Popular Music	4/5 stars
Billboard	Positive (Billboard Pick)
Cashbox	Positive (Pop Pick)
Record World	Positive (Album of the Week)

Lady was originally released in early March 1967 on the Kapp label. It was the twenty-first, the first of the year, studio collection released in Jones' career. The album was distributed as a vinyl LP, containing six songs on side one and six on side two of the record. Decades later, the album was re-released on Geffen Records to digital and streaming sites.

The album received a positive critical reception upon its release. Billboard magazine believed that Jones "is at his very best in this highly potent program of beautiful songs". The publication said that "an easy listening arrangement of 'A Beautiful Friendship' is contrasted by a moving 'Free Again,' adding a perfect balance to the selections," and they praised Jones' "reading" of "If You Go Away" as well. Cashbox reviewed the album the same week and noted that "Currently climbing the Top 100 with his 'Lady' single, Jones here offers an LP of the same name that could do equally well on the charts. In addition to the title track, the set includes 'A Beautiful Friendship,' 'If You Never Come To Me,' 'Theme From ‘The Sand Pebbles’, and 'Brother, Where Are You.' They said to "Keep close tabs on this one."

Record World stated that Jones sings "some mighty pretty songs on this album named after his current click, 'Lady.'" They believed that "The guy has established himself without question and so the crowds will line up". The Times Record described the album as "another plate of endearing quality", adding that "Free Again" and "Once Upon a Time" are "perfectly done for a change-of-pace".

== Chart performance ==
The album debuted on Billboard magazine's Top LP's chart in the issue dated March 25, 1967, peaking at No. 23 during a twenty-five-week run on the chart. It debuted on Cashbox magazine's Top 100 Albums chart in the issue also dated March 18, 1967, peaking at No. 28 during a fourteen-week run on the chart. The album debuted on Record World magazine's 100 Top LP's chart in the issue dated March 25, 1967, peaking at No. 20. Lady stayed on the chart through the spring and summer and dropped out before the fall, with a total twenty-week run on it.

== Track listings ==
=== Vinyl version ===
Side one
No.	Title	Writer(s)	Length
1.	"Lady"	Bert Kaempfert; Larry Kusik; Herbert Rehbein; Charles Singleton	2:42
2.	"A Beautiful Friendship"	Donald Kahn; Stanley Styne	2:39
3.	"Free Again"	Robert Colby; Michel Jourdan; Armand Canfora; Joss Baselli	3:54
4.	"If You Never Come to Me"	Ray Gilbert; Antônio Carlos Jobim; Luís de Oliveira	2:25
5.	"Nice 'N' Easy"	Alan Bergman; Marilyn Bergman; Lew Spence	3:09
6.	"Brother, Where Are You?"	Norman Curtis; Oscar Brown Jr.	2:27

Side two
No.	Title	Writer(s)	Length
7.	"Once Upon a Time"	Charles Strouse; Lee Adams	3:15
8.	"If You Go Away"	Jacques Brel	4:31
9.	"(And We Were Lovers) Theme from "The Sand Pebbles""	Leslie Bricusse; Jerry Goldsmith	2:54
10.	"Girl Talk"	Neal Hefti; Bobby Troup	2:48
11.	"Afraid to Love"	Ralph Blane; Harry Warren	2:50
12.	"It's Easy to Remember"	Richard Rodgers	2:27

=== Digital version ===
Lady (download and streaming)
No.	Title	Writer(s)	Length
1.	"Lady"	Kaempfert; Kusik; Rehbein; Singleton	2:44
2.	"A Beautiful Friendship"	Kahn; Styne	2:39
3.	"Free Again"	Colby; Jourdan; Canfora; Baselli	3:57
4.	"If You Never Come to Me"	Gilbert; Jobim; Oliveria	2:26
5.	"Nice 'N' Easy"	A. Bergman; M. Bergman; Spence	3:08
6.	"Brother, Where Are You"	Curtis; Brown Jr.	2:25
7.	"Once Upon a Time"	Strouse; Adams	3:16
8.	"If You Go Away"	Brel	4:33
9.	"Theme from "The Sand Pebbles" (And We Were Lovers)"	Bricusse; Goldsmith	2:56
10.	"Girl Talk"	Hefti; Troup	2:50
11.	"Afraid to Love"	Blane; Warren	2:55
12.	"It's Easy to Remember"	Rodgers	2:27
Total length:			33:15

== Personnel ==
All credits are adapted from the liner notes of Lady.

- Producer: unspecified
- Arrangers/conductors: Marty Paich; Ralph Carmichael
- Engineer: Bob Doherty

== Charts ==
Chart performance for Lady
Chart (1967)	Peak position
US Billboard Top LP's	23
US Cashbox Top 100 Albums	28
US Record World 100 Top LP's	20

== Release history ==
Region	Date	Format	Label	Ref.
North America and UK	March 1967	LP; Vinyl	Kapp Records	
Worldwide	Circa 2020	Music download; streaming	Geffen Records	
