= Naphthanthrone =

Names
- Preferred IUPAC name 6H-Benzo[cd]pyren-6-one
- Other names pentacyclo[13.3.1.0^{5,18}.0^{8,17}.0^{11,16}]nonadeca-1,3,5(18),6,8(17),9,11(16),12,14-nonaen-19-one

Identifiers
CAS Number	3074-00-8
3D model (JSmol)	Interactive image
ChemSpider	17293
PubChem CID	18310
UNII	M9WAZ0827H
CompTox Dashboard (EPA)	DTXSID60184759
- InChI: InChI=1S/C19H10O/c20-19-14-5-1-3-11-7-9-13-10-8-12-4-2-6-15(19)17(12)18(13)16(11)14/h1-10H Key: CLIKSBRDCNSYNO-UHFFFAOYSA-N
- SMILES: O=C5c2cccc1ccc4c(c12)c3c5cccc3cc4

Properties
Chemical formula	C_{19}H_{10}O
Molar mass	254.288 g·mol^{−1}
Appearance	Pale yellow needles
Density	1.397 g/cm^{3}

Structure
Crystal structure	orthorhombic
Space group	P2_{1}2_{1}2_{1}, No. 19
Lattice constant	a = 17.315 Å, b = 3.973 Å, c = 17.392 Å
Formula units (Z)	4
- Except where otherwise noted, data are given for materials in their standard state (at 25 °C [77 °F], 100 kPa). Infobox references

Naphthanthrone is an organic carbon based molecule formed of five rings, of which four are benzene rings, joined in the shape of the Olympic rings.

The compound can be synthesized by the condensation of pyrene and glycerol in sulfuric acid. Its crystals belong to the orthorhombic crystal system.

== See also ==
- Olympicene
