= Love Story (Johnny Mathis album) =

Studio album by Johnny Mathis
- Released: February 10, 1971
- Recorded: January 18, 1969; July 15–August 14, 1970; December 16, 1970; December 23, 1970; January 4, 1971
- Genre: Vocal; pop/rock
- Length: 32:17
- Label: Columbia
- Producer: Jack Gold; Robert Mersey

Johnny Mathis chronology
Johnny Mathis Sings the Music of Bacharach & Kaempfert (1970)	Love Story (1971)	You've Got a Friend (1971)

Love Story is an album by American pop singer Johnny Mathis that was released on February 10, 1971, by Columbia Records and included a recent Oscar nominee ("What Are You Doing the Rest of Your Life?"), a flashback to 1967 ("Traces"), a new song by Bacharach & David ("Ten Times Forever More"), a lesser-known one by Goffin & King ("I Was There"), and two songs that originated in film scores from 1970 and had lyrics added later: the album closer, "Loss of Love", from Sunflower and the album opener from Love Story, which was subtitled "Where Do I Begin". The norm for Mathis projects from this era was to cover recent hits, and the title track of this one was so recent that the version by Andy Williams began a 13-week run to number nine on Billboard magazine's Hot 100 chart in February 1971, coinciding with the release of this LP.

The Mathis recording of "Ten Times Forever More" was released as a single on January 21 of that year and spent two weeks on Billboard magazine's Easy Listening chart in March that included a peak position at number 32. The album's debut on the magazine's Top LP's chart was in the issue dated March 13 and led to a number 47 showing over the course of 18 weeks. it also debuted on the Cashbox albums chart in the issue dated February 20, 1971, and remained on the chart for 18 weeks, peaking at number 46.

Love Story was released for the first time on compact disc in 1995 as one of two albums on one CD, the other LP being his Raindrops Keep Fallin' on My Head album from 1970. Love Story was also included in Legacy's Mathis box set The Voice of Romance: The Columbia Original Album Collection, which was released on December 8, 2017.

== Reception ==
Professional ratings
Review scores
Source	Rating
Allmusic	3/5 stars
Billboard	positive
The Encyclopedia of Popular Music	3/5 stars

Allmusic's Joe Viglione found much to praise retrospectively about the album and Mathis. "His rendition of '(Where Do I Begin) Love Story' is riveting, a sweeping and majestic piece to lead off the record, and not the usual Jack Gold musical movement, but more pronounced and determined." Viglione was especially fond of how Lynn Anderson's country hit "Rose Garden" was given a mainstream arrangement. "As a pure pop tune, it works very well, a standout performance chock-full of backing vocalists and unique instrumentation. This could have been a hit for Mathis, as it goes beyond the usual formula of 'let's put some sweet accompaniment behind the voice and let Johnny do his thing.'" He describes side two as "careful and pleasant", except for its closing song, "Loss of Love", which "brings a sense of grandness back to the project and concludes an important component of the vast Johnny Mathis catalog."

== Track listing ==
=== Side one ===
1. "(Where Do I Begin) Love Story" (Francis Lai, Carl Sigman) – 2:45
2. "Rose Garden" (Joe South) – 2:51
3. "Ten Times Forever More" (Burt Bacharach, Hal David) – 2:36
4. "It's Impossible" (Armando Manzanero, Sid Wayne) – 3:00
5. "I Was There" (Gerry Goffin, Carole King) – 2:26
6. "What Are You Doing the Rest of Your Life?" from The Happy Ending (Alan Bergman, Marilyn Bergman, Michel Legrand) – 3:00

=== Side two ===
1. "We've Only Just Begun" (Roger Nichols, Paul Williams) – 3:05
2. "Traces" (Buddy Buie, J. R. Cobb, Emory Gordy Jr.) – 2:45
3. "For the Good Times" (Kris Kristofferson) – 3:42
4. "My Sweet Lord" (George Harrison) – 3:16
5. "Loss of Love" (Henry Mancini, Bob Merrill) – 2:51

=== 2017 CD bonus track ===
This album's CD release as part of the 2017 box set The Voice of Romance: The Columbia Original Album Collection included a bonus track that was previously unavailable:

- Medley – 2:47
  a. "Goin' Out of My Head" (Teddy Randazzo, Bobby Weinstein)
  b. "Can't Take My Eyes Off You" (Bob Crewe, Bob Gaudio)

== Recording dates ==
From the liner notes for The Voice of Romance: The Columbia Original Album Collection:

- January 18, 1969 – "I Was There"
- July 15–August 14, 1970 – "Loss of Love"
- December 16, 1970 – "My Sweet Lord", "We've Only Just Begun", "(Where Do I Begin) Love Story"
- December 23, 1970 – "For the Good Times", "It's Impossible", "Rose Garden"
- January 4, 1971 – "Goin' Out of My Head/Can't Take My Eyes Off You", "Ten Times Forever More", "Traces", "What Are You Doing the Rest of Your Life?"

== Personnel ==
- Johnny Mathis – vocals
- Jack Gold – producer (except as noted)
- Robert Mersey – producer ("I Was There")
- Perry Botkin, Jr. – arranger and conductor
- Phil Macy – engineer
- Jim Marshall – photography

== Bibliography ==
- Whitburn, Joel (2007), Joel Whitburn Presents Billboard Top Adult Songs, 1961-2006, Record Research Inc., ISBN 978-0898201697
- Whitburn, Joel (2009), Joel Whitburn's Top Pop Singles, 1955-2008, Record Research Inc., ISBN 978-0898201802
- Whitburn, Joel (2010), Joel Whitburn Presents Top Pop Albums, Seventh Edition, Record Research Inc., ISBN 978-0-89820-183-3
- Hoffmann, Frank K (1988), The Cash box album charts, 1955-1974, Scarecrow Press, ISBN 1-56308-316-7
