= Remember When (We Made These Memories) =

Single by Wayne Newton

from the album Wayne Newton...Now!
- B-side: "Keep the Lovin' Feeling"
- Released: September 1965
- Genre: Pop
- Length: 2:13
- Label: Capitol Records 5514
- Songwriter(s): Bert Kaempfert, Charles Singleton, Eddie Snyder
- Producer(s): Steve Douglas

Wayne Newton singles chronology
"Summer Wind" (1965)	"Remember When (We Made These Memories)" (1965)	"Some Sunday Morning" (1965)

"Remember When (We Made These Memories)" is a song written by Bert Kaempfert, Charles Singleton and Eddie Snyder, and performed by Wayne Newton. It reached #15 on the U.S. adult contemporary chart and #69 on the Billboard Hot 100 in 1965. It was featured on his 1966 album, Wayne Newton...Now!

The song was produced by Steve Douglas arranged by Jimmie Haskell.

== Other versions ==
- Bert Kaempfert and His Orchestra released a version as the B-side to his 1965 single "Bye Bye Blues".
- Max Bygraves released a version as the B-side to his 1966 single "Always Together".
- The King Brothers released a version as the B-side to their 1966 single "Everytime I See You".
- Johnny Mathis released a version on his 1970 album, Johnny Mathis Sings the Music of Bacharach & Kaempfert.
- Brenda Lee released a version on her 1966 Album "Bye Bye Blues".
