= Olympicene =

- An atomic force microscopy image of olympicene

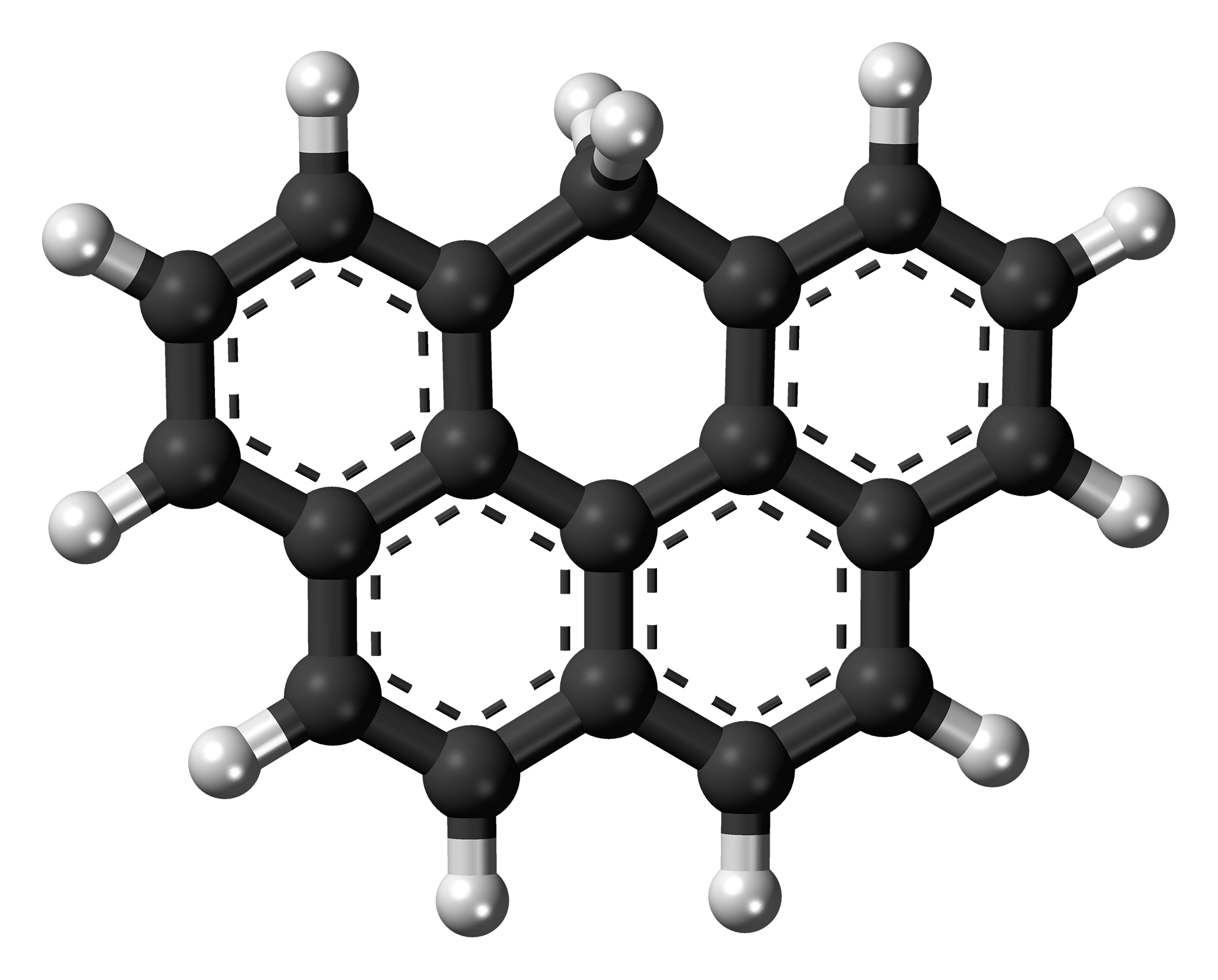

Names
- Preferred IUPAC name 6H-Benzo[cd]pyrene

Identifiers
CAS Number	191-33-3
3D model (JSmol)	Interactive image
ChemSpider	9152767
PubChem CID	10977566
UNII	4R5BNS9ZCA
CompTox Dashboard (EPA)	DTXSID501018726
- InChI: InChI=1S/C19H12/c1-3-12-7-9-14-10-8-13-4-2-6-16-11-15(5-1)17(12)19(14)18(13)16/h1-10H,11H2 Key: CFXWAPSYPXUYCO-UHFFFAOYSA-N
- SMILES: C1C=C2C=CC3=C4C2=C5C1=CC=CC5=CC4=CC=C3

Properties
Chemical formula	C_{19}H_{12}
Molar mass	240.305 g·mol^{−1}
Appearance	white powder
Density	1.28 g/cm^{3}
Boiling point	511.754 °C (953.157 °F; 784.904 K) at 760 mmHg

Hazards
Flash point	254.195 °C (489.551 °F; 527.345 K)
- Except where otherwise noted, data are given for materials in their standard state (at 25 °C [77 °F], 100 kPa). Infobox references

Olympicene is an organic carbon-based molecule formed of five rings, of which four are benzene rings, joined in the shape of the Olympic rings.

The molecule was conceived in March 2010 as a way to celebrate the 2012 London Olympics by Graham Richards of University of Oxford and Antony Williams. It was first synthesized by researchers Anish Mistry and David Fox of the University of Warwick in the UK. Relative energies of olympicene and its isomers were first predicted from quantum electronic-structure computations by Andrew Valentine and David Mazziotti of the University of Chicago.

== Electron counting ==
Olympicene has 18 pi electrons in its ring system; as it is a flat molecule, this makes it an aromatic molecule. The central ring is not an aromatic ring.

== Related compounds ==
A very similar molecule (benzo[c]phenanthrene) which lacks the −CH_{2}− spacer between the two sides of the molecule has been known for many years. This earlier molecule has been studied by X-ray crystallography and due to the steric clash between two hydrogen atoms the molecule is not flat. It is likely that the olympicene is flatter, as no steric clash will exist between the two rings.

A molecule where the −CH_{2}− spacer has been replaced with a ketone (C=O) group (naphthanthrone) has been known for decades. Molecules where the −CH_{2}− spacer has been replaced with oxygen and sulfur atoms have been known for some time. The sulfur compound has a C–S–C angle of 104.53°, which suggests that the sulfur atom is an sp^{3}-hybridized atom rather than being sp^{2}. This suggests that the sulfur atom is not part of the pi system of the molecule.

The Olympic rings, showing the interlinking

Professor Sir Martyn Poliakoff of the University of Nottingham has pointed out that the Olympic rings are interlinked, rather than tangent as in olympicene, and that a better likeness could be made using catenanes. A catenane-based olympic molecule was synthesized in 1994 by Fraser Stoddart and given the name olympiadane.

== Synthesis ==
The synthesis starts using a Wittig reaction of pyrene carboxaldehyde. To obtain the ylide needed, firstly triphenyl phosphine is reacted with ethyl bromoacetate to form a phosphonium salt; after treatment of this salt with a mild base, the ylide can be reacted with the aldehyde in toluene. After hydrogenation of the alpha,beta unsaturated carbonyl compound using hydrogen and palladium in ethyl acetate the ester was converted into the acid chloride using potassium hydroxide, acid and then thionyl chloride. By means of a Friedel–Crafts reaction using aluminium chloride in dichloromethane a ketone was formed. On reduction of this ketone using lithium aluminium hydride the alcohol 3,4-dihydro-5H-benzo[cd]pyren-5-ol was obtained, the 3,4-dihydro-5H-benzo[cd]pyren-5-ol was treated with an acid in the form of ion exchange resin to furnish the product.

== Images ==
Preliminary images of it were made using scanning tunnelling microscopy. More detailed images were made by IBM researchers in Zurich using non-contact atomic force microscopy in 2012.

== See also ==
- List of chemical compounds with unusual names
- Olympiadane
