= Close to You (Johnny Mathis album) =

Close To You

Studio album by Johnny Mathis
- Released: August 19, 1970
- Recorded: May 27, 1970; July 10, 1970; July 13, 1970; July 15, 1970
- Genre: Vocal
- Length: 35:09
- Label: Columbia
- Producer: Jack Gold

Johnny Mathis chronology
Raindrops Keep Fallin' on My Head (1970)	Close To You (1970)	Johnny Mathis Sings the Music of Bacharach & Kaempfert (1970)

Close To You is an album by American pop singer Johnny Mathis that was released on August 19, 1970, by Columbia Records and mostly included his recordings of hits that other artists had that year. The exceptions were the new movie theme "Pieces of Dreams" and the 1967 songs "Wave" by Antônio Carlos Jobim and "Yellow Days", which was an Easy Listening hit for former Mathis collaborator Percy Faith. In the UK the album was retitled after a different song Mathis covered on it, "The Long and Winding Road".

The release of the first single from the album, "Pieces of Dreams", coincided with the release of the film of the same name, in which it is sung by Peggy Lee. The Mathis recording made its first appearance on Billboard magazine's Easy Listening chart in the issue dated September 12 of that year and got as high as number nine during its eight weeks there. The album's debut on the magazine's Top LP's chart came the following month, in the issue from October 10, and marked the start of a nine-week run that took it to number 61. it also debuted on the Cash Box albums chart in the issue dated October 3, 1970, and remained on the chart for eight weeks, peaking at number 73. A second single, "Evil Ways", had its Easy Listening debut in the November 14 issue and reached number 30 during its four weeks there.

== Reception ==
Professional ratings
Review scores
Source	Rating
Billboard	Positive
Cash Box	Positive
The Encyclopedia of Popular Music	3/5 stars
Record World	4/4 stars

Billboard wrote, "Among the standout performances are the title tune, 'Until It's Time for You to Go', 'Why Can’t I Touch You', 'Song of Joy', and 'Come Saturday Morning'. Top Ernie Freeman arrangements." Record World rated the album four out of four stars: "The Mathis formula, an infallible one, is to take that lush ballad and lush it up as far as it will go."

== Track listing ==
=== Side one ===
1. "(They Long to Be) Close to You" (Burt Bacharach, Hal David) – 3:26
2. "Evil Ways" (Sonny Henry) – 2:36
3. "Come Saturday Morning" from The Sterile Cuckoo (Fred Karlin, Dory Previn) – 2:10
4. "Yellow Days" (Alan Bernstein, Álvaro Carrillo) – 2:40
5. "Pieces of Dreams" from Pieces of Dreams (Alan Bergman, Marilyn Bergman, Michel Legrand) – 2:44
6. "Song of Joy (Himno a la Alegria)" (Ludwig van Beethoven, Waldo de los Rios) – 4:00

=== Side two ===
1. "Everything Is Beautiful" (Ray Stevens) – 3:28
2. "The Long and Winding Road" (John Lennon, Paul McCartney) – 3:25
3. "(If You Let Me Make Love to You Then) Why Can't I Touch You?" from Salvation (Charles Courtney, Peter Link) – 3:15
4. "Wave" (Antônio Carlos Jobim) – 3:30
5. "Until It's Time for You to Go" (Buffy Sainte-Marie) – 3:55

=== 2017 CD bonus track ===
This album's CD release as part of the 2017 box set The Voice of Romance: The Columbia Original Album Collection included a bonus track that was previously unavailable:

- "Caroline" (Bodie Chandler) – 2:44

== Recording dates ==
From the liner notes for The Voice of Romance: The Columbia Original Album Collection:

- May 13, 1970 – "Caroline"
- May 27, 1970 – "Everything Is Beautiful", "Evil Ways", "Until It's Time for You to Go"
- July 10, 1970 – "Pieces of Dreams", "Yellow Days"
- July 13, 1970 – "(If You Let Me Make Love to You Then) Why Can't I Touch You?", "The Long and Winding Road", "Song of Joy (Himno a la Alegria)", "(They Long to Be) Close to You"
- July 15, 1970 – "Come Saturday Morning", "Wave"

== Personnel ==
- Johnny Mathis – vocals
- Jack Gold – producer
- Ernie Freeman – arranger and conductor
- Phil Macy – engineer
- Jim Marshall – photography
- Virginia Team – cover design

== Bibliography ==
- Whitburn, Joel (2007), Joel Whitburn Presents Billboard Top Adult Songs, 1961-2006, Record Research Inc., ISBN 978-0898201697
- Whitburn, Joel (2010), Joel Whitburn Presents Top Pop Albums, Seventh Edition, Record Research Inc., ISBN 978-0-89820-183-3
- Hoffmann, Frank W (1988), The Cash box album charts, 1955-1974, Scarecrow Press, ISBN 0-810-82005-6
