= Johnny Mathis in Person: Recorded Live at Las Vegas =

Live album by Johnny Mathis
- Released: December 22, 1971
- Recorded: May 20–22, 1971
- Venue: Caesars Palace, Las Vegas
- Genre: Vocal pop
- Length: 49:57
- Label: Columbia
- Producer: Sid Feller

Johnny Mathis chronology
You've Got a Friend (1971)	Johnny Mathis in Person: Recorded Live at Las Vegas (1971)	The First Time Ever (I Saw Your Face) (1972)

Professional ratings
Review scores
Source	Rating
Allmusic	3/5 stars
Billboard	positive
The Encyclopedia of Popular Music	3/5 stars

Johnny Mathis in Person: Recorded Live at Las Vegas is a live album by American pop singer Johnny Mathis that was recorded at Caesars Palace and released on December 22, 1971, by Columbia Records. All but five of the 23 songs performed had appeared on his studio albums, while the five previously unrecorded songs (described below) have not appeared on a Mathis studio album since.

The album made its first appearance on Billboard magazine's Top LP's & Tapes chart in the issue dated February 5, 1972, and remained there for seven weeks, peaking at number 128.

== Reception ==
Billboard felt that "Mathis's act is beautifully captured on this two-record set."

== Track listing ==
All tracks were recorded May 20–22, 1971.

=== Side one ===
1. "In the Morning" (Barry Gibb) – 3:22
2. Medley – 4:40
  a. "(They Long to Be) Close to You" (Burt Bacharach, Hal David)
  b. "We've Only Just Begun" (Roger Nichols, Paul Williams)
3. Medley – 4:29
  a. "Dreamy" (Erroll Garner, Sydney Shaw)
  b. "Misty" (Johnny Burke, Garner)
4. "Come Runnin'" (Roc Hillman) – 2:20

=== Side two ===
1. "(Where Do I Begin) Love Story" (Francis Lai, Carl Sigman) – 3:00
2. "April in Paris" (Vernon Duke, E.Y. "Yip" Harburg) – 3:32
3. "Day In, Day Out" (Johnny Mercer, Rube Bloom) – 3:01

=== Side three ===
1. Medley – 8:52
  a. "The Twelfth of Never" (Jerry Livingston, Paul Francis Webster)
  b. "Wild Is the Wind" (Dimitri Tiomkin, Ned Washington)
  c. "When Sunny Gets Blue" (Marvin Fisher, Jack Segal)
  d. "It's Not for Me to Say" (Robert Allen, Al Stillman)
  e. "Chances Are" (Allen, Stillman)
  f. "Love Theme from Romeo and Juliet (A Time for Us)" (Larry Kusik, Nino Rota, Eddie Snyder)
  g. "Tonight" (Leonard Bernstein, Stephen Sondheim)
  h. "Dulcinea" (Joe Darion, Mitch Leigh)
  i. "The Impossible Dream (The Quest)" (Darion, Leigh)
  j. "Wonderful! Wonderful!" (Sherman Edwards, Ben Raleigh)
2. "And Her Mother Came Too" from A to Z (Ivor Novello, Dion Titheradge) – 2:49

=== Side four ===
1. "I Got Love" from Purlie (Gary Geld, Peter Udell) – 3:34
2. "Maria" (Bernstein, Sondheim) – 3:54
3. "If We Only Have Love" (Eric Blau, Jacques Brel, Mort Shuman) – 5:05
4. "If We Only Have Love" (instrumental) – 1:23

== Personnel ==
- Johnny Mathis - vocals
- Jack Gold - executive producer
- Sid Feller - producer
- Roy M. Rogosin - conductor
- Perry Botkin, Jr. - arranger ("(Where Do I Begin) Love Story")
- Jack Elliott - arranger ("Day In, Day Out", "I Got Love")
- Allyn Ferguson - arranger ("Come Runnin'")
- D'Arneill Pershing - arranger (except as noted)
- David Rhodes - arranger ("Maria")
- Rafael O. Valentin - engineer
- Beverly Parker - photographs
- Guy Webster - cover photograph
- Morgan Ames - liner notes

== Bibliography ==
- Whitburn, Joel (2010), Joel Whitburn Presents Top Pop Albums, Seventh Edition, Record Research Inc., ISBN 0-89820-183-7
