= You've Got a Friend (Johnny Mathis album) =

Studio album by Johnny Mathis
- Released: August 11, 1971
- Recorded: April–July 1971
- Genre: Traditional pop; vocal pop
- Length: 35:35
- Label: Columbia
- Producer: Johnny Mathis; Richard Perry; Jack Gold

Johnny Mathis chronology
Love Story (1971)	You've Got a Friend (1971)	Johnny Mathis in Person: Recorded Live at Las Vegas (1972)

Professional ratings
Review scores
Source	Rating
Billboard	positive
The Encyclopedia of Popular Music	3/5 stars

You've Got a Friend is an album by American pop singer Johnny Mathis that was released on August 11, 1971, by Columbia Records. The phrase "Today's Great Hits" can be found above the title on both sides of the record jacket as well as both sides of the LP label as if to emphasize that this is essentially an album covering songs that were recently on the charts. This was a common practice of many vocalists of the period, so much so in fact that fellow Columbia artist Andy Williams also released an album titled You've Got a Friend in August 1971 on which he coincidentally covers seven of the 11 tracks that Mathis recorded for this album.

The Mathis record made its first appearance on Billboard magazine's Top LP's & Tapes chart in the issue dated September 4, 1971, and remained there for 10 weeks, peaking at number 80. it also debuted on the Cashbox albums chart in the issue dated September 11, 1971, and remained on the chart for eight weeks, peaking at number 94.

The single from this album, "If We Only Have Love", was projected to be a hit in the "Top 60 Pop Spotlight" in the issue of Billboard dated October 9, 1971, and was listed as a "Pick Single" in the magazine's February 26, 1972, issue but failed to reach either its Hot 100 or Easy Listening charts.

You've Got a Friend was also included in Legacy's Mathis box set The Voice of Romance: The Columbia Original Album Collection, which was released on December 8, 2017.

== Reception ==
In their review for retailers, Billboard wrote, "Mathis is a consistent heavy chart seller with his packages, all of which are super performances, but this one tops the others."

== Track listing ==
=== Side one ===
1. "You've Got a Friend" (Carole King) – 4:31
2. "How Can You Mend a Broken Heart?" (Barry Gibb, Robin Gibb) – 3:16
3. "Help Me Make It Through the Night" (Kris Kristofferson) – 3:16
4. "If You Could Read My Mind" (Gordon Lightfoot) – 4:01
5. "Never Can Say Goodbye" (Clifton Davis) – 3:07

=== Side two ===
1. "It's Too Late" (Carole King) – 3:07
2. "We Can Work It Out" (John Lennon, Paul McCartney) – 3:03
3. "Long Ago and Far Away" (James Taylor) – 3:11
4. "If" (David Gates) – 3:03
5. "For All We Know" from Lovers and Other Strangers (Jimmy Griffin, Fred Karlin, Robb Royer) – 2:54
6. "If We Only Have Love" (Eric Blau, Jacques Brel, Mort Shuman) – 3:16

=== 2017 CD bonus tracks ===
This album's CD release as part of the 2017 box set The Voice of Romance: The Columbia Original Album Collection included four bonus tracks that were previously unavailable:

- "Reach Out I'll Be There" (Holland–Dozier–Holland) – 4:03
- "So Much in Love" (George Williams, Billy Jackson, Roy Straigis)^{[A]} – 4:02
- "I Only Have Eyes for You" from Dames (Al Dubin, Harry Warren) – 3:43
- "Golden Slumbers" (Lennon, McCartney) – 3:30
- ^{A} The writers of this track were erroneously credited as Marjorie Goetschius and Jascha Heifetz, who penned a 1940s song also titled "So Much in Love"; it has however a different melody.

== Recording dates ==
From the liner notes for The Voice of Romance: The Columbia Original Album Collection:

- April 30, 1971 – "For All We Know", "If"
- May 5, 1971 – "Help Me Make It Through the Night", "Never Can Say Goodbye", "Reach Out I'll Be There"
- May 7, 1971 – "If You Could Read My Mind", "Long Ago and Far Away", "So Much in Love"
- May 11, 1971 – "Golden Slumbers", "I Only Have Eyes for You", "We Can Work It Out"
- June 30, 1971 – "How Can You Mend a Broken Heart?", "It's Too Late", "You've Got a Friend"
- July 8, 1971 – "If We Only Have Love"

== Personnel ==
- Johnny Mathis - producer ("You've Got a Friend", "How Can You Mend a Broken Heart?", "It's Too Late", "If We Only Have Love"); vocals
- Richard Perry - producer (except as noted)
- Jack Gold - producer ("If", "For All We Know")
- Al Capps - arranger ("If", "For All We Know")
- D'Arneill Pershing - arranger (except as noted)
- Roy M. Rogosin - conductor
- Peter Romano - engineer
- Phil Macy - engineer
- Guy Webster - front and back cover photos
- Virginia Team - design

== Bibliography ==
- O'Neil, Thomas (1999), The Grammys, Perigree Books, ISBN 0-399-52477-0
- Whitburn, Joel (2002), Joel Whitburn's Top Country Singles, 1944-2001, Record Research Inc., ISBN 0-89820-151-9
- Whitburn, Joel (2004), Joel Whitburn Presents Top R&B/Hip-Hop Singles, 1942-2004, Record Research Inc., ISBN 0-89820-160-8
- Whitburn, Joel (2007), Joel Whitburn Presents Billboard Top Adult Songs, 1961-2006, Record Research Inc., ISBN 978-0-89820-169-7
- Whitburn, Joel (2009), Joel Whitburn's Top Pop Singles, 1955-2008, Record Research Inc., ISBN 978-0-89820-180-2
- Whitburn, Joel (2010), Joel Whitburn Presents Top Pop Albums, Seventh Edition, Record Research Inc., ISBN 978-0-89820-183-3
- Wiley, Mason; Bona, Damien (1996), Inside Oscar: The Unofficial History of the Academy Awards, Ballantine Books, ISBN 0-345-40053-4
- Hoffmann, Frank K (1988), The Cash box album charts, 1955-1974, Scarecrow Press, ISBN 0-8108-2005-6
