= A Beautiful Friendship (song) =

Single by Ella Fitzgerald

from the album Jukebox Ella: The Complete Verve Singles, Vol. 1
- B-side: "Stay There"
- Released: 1956
- Label: Verve
- Songwriters: Donald Kahn; Stanley Styne

Ella Fitzgerald singles chronology
"Too Young for the Blues" (1956)	"A Beautiful Friendship" (1956)	"The Silent Treatment" (1956)

Audio
- "A Beautiful Friendship" on YouTube

"A Beautiful Friendship", also known as "(The End of) A Beautiful Friendship", is a song composed by Donald Kahn, with lyrics by Stanley Styne. It was originally recorded by Ella Fitzgerald for Verve Records in 1956.

== Releases and critical reception ==
Professional ratings
Review scores
Source	Rating
Billboard	favorable
Billboard	4/4 stars

Ella Fitzgerald recorded her version for Verve with the orchestra conducted by Buddy Bregman.

Billboard reviewed her single (Verve 2012, with "Stay There" on the flip side) on 26 May 1956, writing: "The great silken pipes get a fine workout on these listenable sides. [...] Her smartest disk so far on the label" and recommending disk jockeys to "slot" both sides "prominently".

In June–July 1956, the song appeared on Billboard's Tunes with Greatest Radio-TV Audience list.

In 1962, the recording was re-released coupled with "I'll Always Be in Love with You" (Verve 10359). Billboard called it Ella's "lovely old ballad-standard" and rated both sides four stars out of four, which indicated a strong sales potential".

== Cover versions ==
Nat King Cole covered the song on his album Nat King Cole Sings / George Shearing Plays.

Jack Jones recorded the song for his 1967 album Lady in an easy listening arrangement.
