= Odds and Ends (song) =

Single by Dionne Warwick
- B-side: "As Long as There's an Apple Tree"
- Released: July 1969
- Genre: Pop
- Length: 3:21
- Label: Scepter
- Songwriters: Burt Bacharach; Hal David
- Producers: Bacharach; David

Dionne Warwick singles chronology
"The April Fools" (1969)	"Odds and Ends" (1969)	"You've Lost That Lovin' Feelin'" (1969)

"Odds and Ends" is a 1969 song by Dionne Warwick, written by Burt Bacharach and Hal David. It was released as a non-album single. Narrowly missing the U.S. Billboard Top 40, it reached the Top 20 on the Adult Contemporary charts of Canada and the U.S., where it peaked at number seven.

This song features a Whistler, heard in the intro, instrumental section, and the outro, before the song's fade, sections of the song.

In the song, the narrator wakes up, finding the bed empty and the closet bare, only to find an empty tube of toothpaste, as well as a half filled cup of coffee. The narrator misses the lover's presence, surrounded by the "odds and ends of a beautiful love affair."

== Track listing and formats ==
- US 7" Vinyl

A. "Odds and Ends" – 3:21
B. "As Long As There's an Apple Tree" – 2:05

== Charts ==
Chart (1969)	Peak position
Australia (Kent Music Report)	76
Canada Top Singles (RPM)	40
Canada Adult Contemporary (RPM)	15
US Billboard Hot 100	43
US Adult Contemporary (Billboard)	7
US Cash Box Top 100	31

== Cover versions ==
The song was covered by Johnny Mathis on his 1970 LP, Raindrops Keep Fallin' on My Head. His version reached #30 on the U.S. Easy Listening chart. Sandler and Young also covered it on their eponymous 1969 Capitol Records album.
