= Olympiadane =

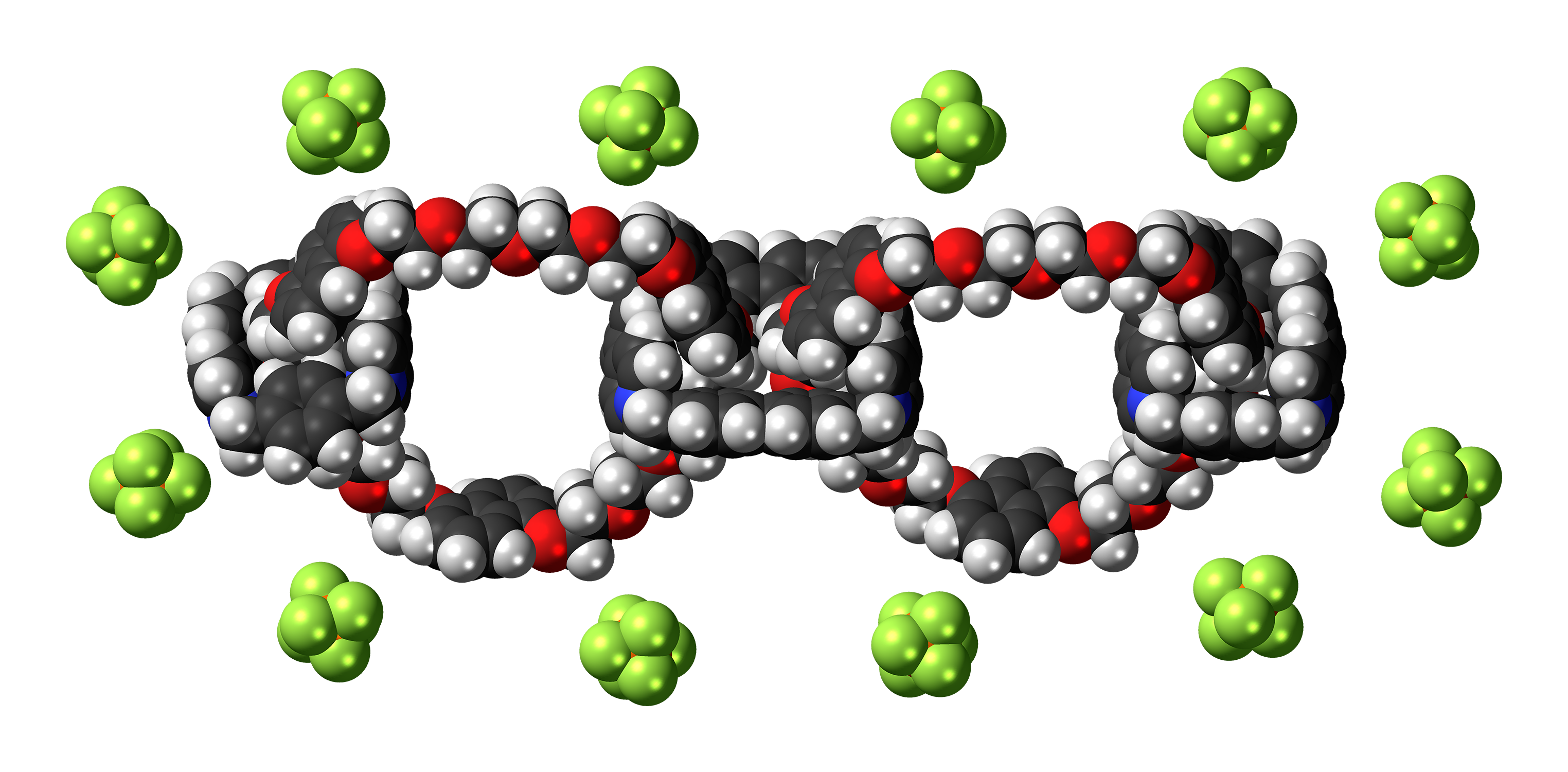

Names
- IUPAC name 6,9,12,15,18,29,32,35,38,41,52,55,58,61,64-pentadecaoxaheptacyclo[63.4.0.0^{5,69}.0^{19,24}.0^{23,28}.0^{42,47}.0^{46,51}]nonahexaconta-1(69),2,4,19,21,23,25,27,42,44,46,48,50,65,67-pentadecaene;5,12,19,26-tetrazoniaheptacyclo[24.2.2.2^{2,5}.2^{7,10}.2^{12,15}.2^{16,19}.2^{21,24}]tetraconta-1(29),2(40),3,5(39),7,9,12,14,16(34),17,19(33),21(32),22,24(31),26(30),27,35,37-octadecaene;dodecahexafluorophosphate

Identifiers
CAS Number	158394-29-7
3D model (JSmol)	Interactive image
ChemSpider	26000999
PubChem CID	71308249
CompTox Dashboard (EPA)	DTXSID40745443
- InChI: InChI=1S/2C54H66O15.3C36H32N4.12F6P/c2*1-7-43-44-8-2-14-50(43)65-38-32-59-26-20-56-22-28-61-34-40-67-52-16-5-12-48-47(52)11-6-18-54(48)69-42-36-63-30-24-57-23-29-62-35-41-68-53-17-4-9-45-46(53)10-3-15-51(45)66-39-33-60-27-21-55-19-25-58-31-37-64-49(44)13-1;3*1-2-30-4-3-29(1)25-37-17-9-33(10-18-37)35-13-21-39(22-14-35)27-31-5-7-32(8-6-31)28-40-23-15-36(16-24-40)34-11-19-38(26-30)20-12-34;12*1-7(2,3,4,5)6/h2*1-18H,19-42H2;3*1-24H,25-28H2;;;;;;;;;;;;/q;;3*+4;12*-1 Key: ROLRJLKBOAVDIY-UHFFFAOYSA-N
- SMILES: c1cc2c3cccc2OCCOCCOCCOCCOc4cccc5c4cccc5OCCOCCOCCOCCOc6cccc7c6cccc7OCCOCCOCCOCCOc3c1.c1cc2c3cccc2OCCOCCOCCOCCOc4cccc5c4cccc5OCCOCCOCCOCCOc6cccc7c6cccc7OCCOCCOCCOCCOc3c1.c1cc2ccc1C[n+]3ccc(cc3)-c4cc[n+](cc4)Cc5ccc(cc5)C[n+]6ccc(cc6)-c7cc[n+](cc7)C2.c1cc2ccc1C[n+]3ccc(cc3)-c4cc[n+](cc4)Cc5ccc(cc5)C[n+]6ccc(cc6)-c7cc[n+](cc7)C2.c1cc2ccc1C[n+]3ccc(cc3)-c4cc[n+](cc4)Cc5ccc(cc5)C[n+]6ccc(cc6)-c7cc[n+](cc7)C2.F[P-](F)(F)(F)(F)F.F[P-](F)(F)(F)(F)F.F[P-](F)(F)(F)(F)F.F[P-](F)(F)(F)(F)F.F[P-](F)(F)(F)(F)F.F[P-](F)(F)(F)(F)F.F[P-](F)(F)(F)(F)F.F[P-](F)(F)(F)(F)F.F[P-](F)(F)(F)(F)F.F[P-](F)(F)(F)(F)F.F[P-](F)(F)(F)(F)F.F[P-](F)(F)(F)(F)F

Properties
Chemical formula	C_{228}H_{236}F_{72}N_{12}O_{30}P_{12}
Molar mass	5364.020 g·mol^{−1}
- Except where otherwise noted, data are given for materials in their standard state (at 25 °C [77 °F], 100 kPa). verify (what is ?) Infobox references

Olympiadane is a mechanically interlocked molecule composed of five interlocking macrocycles that resembles the Olympic rings. The molecule is a linear pentacatenane or a [5]catenane. It was synthesized and named by Fraser Stoddart and coworkers in 1994. The molecule was designed without any practical use in mind, although other catenanes may have possible application to the construction of a molecular computer.

== See also ==
- Olympicene
