= Raindrops Keep Fallin' on My Head (Johnny Mathis album) =

Studio album by Johnny Mathis
- Released: February 25, 1970
- Recorded: October 14, 1969; January 6–7, 1970; January 22, 1970
- Genre: Vocal
- Length: 35:28
- Label: Columbia
- Producer: Jack Gold

Johnny Mathis chronology
Give Me Your Love for Christmas (1969)	Raindrops Keep Fallin' on My Head (1970)	Close to You (1970)

Raindrops Keep Fallin' on My Head is an album by American pop singer Johnny Mathis that was released on February 25, 1970, by Columbia Records and included several covers of chart hits from the previous year along with 1964's "Watch What Happens" and the 1966 tunes "Alfie" and "A Man and a Woman".

The album's producer, Jack Gold, added lyrics to the instrumental theme from "Midnight Cowboy", and it became the first song from the album to be released as a single. While it did manage to reach number 20 on Billboard magazine's Easy Listening chart during the five weeks it spent there that began in the issue dated November 15, 1969, an instrumental version by Ferrante and Teicher had debuted there just two weeks earlier and surpassed the Mathis showing by reaching number two in addition to peaking at number 10 on the magazine's Hot 100. "Odds and Ends" was the second single from this album and had its first appearance on the Easy Listening chart in the March 21, 1970, issue, beginning a three-week run that took the song to number 30. The album itself started a run of 26 weeks on their Top LP's chart just a few issues later and got as high as number 38. The album debuted on the Cashbox albums chart in the issue dated March 28, 1970, and remained on the chart for 17 weeks, peaking at number 39.

Raindrops Keep Fallin' on My Head was released on compact disc in 1995 as one of two albums on one CD, Along with 1971 Mathis LP, Love Story. Raindrops Keep Fallin' on My Head was also included in Legacy's Mathis box set The Voice of Romance: The Columbia Original Album Collection, which was released on December 8, 2017.

== Reception ==
Professional ratings
Review scores
Source	Rating
Allmusic	3.5/5 stars
Billboard	positive
The Encyclopedia of Popular Music	4/5 stars

Joe Viglione of Allmusic remarked that "Mathis rarely gets credit for the way he can bend and shape notes, obvious on "Something" as well as his reading of "Honey Come Back", Glen Campbell's 1970 hit." He also praised the album as a whole. "The sound with Jack Gold steering the ship is much more restrained than when Percy Faith and Nelson Riddle added their magic to Mathis's voice, but for the time it was just perfect."

== Track listing ==
=== Side one ===
1. "Raindrops Keep Fallin' on My Head" from Butch Cassidy and the Sundance Kid (Burt Bacharach, Hal David) – 2:36
2. "Honey Come Back" (Jimmy Webb) – 3:02
3. "Watch What Happens" from The Umbrellas of Cherbourg (Norman Gimbel, Michel Legrand) – 3:20
4. "Something" (George Harrison) – 2:34
5. "Alfie" from Alfie (Burt Bacharach, Hal David) – 3:15
6. "Midnight Cowboy" from Midnight Cowboy (John Barry, Jack Gold) – 2:49

=== Side two ===
1. "A Man and a Woman" from A Man and a Woman (Pierre Barouh, Jerry Keller, Francis Lai) – 3:25
2. "Odds and Ends" (Burt Bacharach, Hal David) – 3:04
3. "Jean" from The Prime of Miss Jean Brodie (Rod McKuen) – 3:44
4. "Everybody's Talkin'" from Midnight Cowboy (Fred Neil) – 3:02
5. "Bridge over Troubled Water" (Paul Simon, Art Garfunkel) – 4:37

== Recording dates ==
From the liner notes for The Voice of Romance: The Columbia Original Album Collection:

- October 14, 1969 – "Midnight Cowboy"
- January 6, 1970 – "A Man and a Woman", "Raindrops Keep Fallin' on My Head"
- January 7, 1970 – "Everybody's Talkin'", "Odds and Ends", "Something", "Watch What Happens"
- January 22, 1970 – "Alfie", "Bridge over Troubled Water", "Honey Come Back", "Jean"

== Personnel ==
- Johnny Mathis – vocals
- Jack Gold – producer
- Ernie Freeman – arranger and conductor (except where noted)
- Al Capps – arranger and conductor ("Midnight Cowboy")
- Phil Macy – engineer
- Guy Webster – photography

== Bibliography ==
- Whitburn, Joel (2007), Joel Whitburn Presents Billboard Top Adult Songs, 1961-2006, Record Research Inc., ISBN 978-0898201697
- Whitburn, Joel (2009), Joel Whitburn's Top Pop Singles, 1955-2008, Record Research Inc., ISBN 978-0898201802
- Whitburn, Joel (2010), Joel Whitburn Presents Top Pop Albums, Seventh Edition, Record Research Inc., ISBN 978-0-89820-183-3
- Hoffmann, Frank W (1988), The Cash box album charts, 1955-1974, Scarecrow Press, ISBN 0-810-82005-6
