= Olympic symbols =

Symbols of the Olympic Games

The International Olympic Committee (IOC) uses icons, flags, and symbols to represent and enhance the Olympic Games. These symbols include those commonly used during Olympic competitions such as the flame, fanfare, and theme as well as those used both during and outside competition, such as the Olympic flag.

The Olympic flag was created in 1914 under the guidance of Baron de Coubertin of France. It was first hoisted in Alexandria, Egypt, in Old Shatby Stadium which is now located in Al Ittihad Alexandria Club, at the 1914 Pan-Egyptian Games. The five rings on the flag represent the inhabited continents of the world (the Americas considered as one continent). It contains the colours blue, black, red, yellow, and green, which are common on national flags globally.

== Motto and creed ==
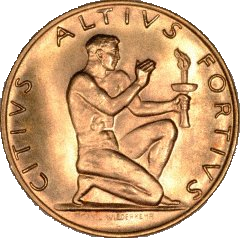
The motto on a 1948 Summer Olympics medal

The original Olympic motto is the hendiatris "Citius, Altius, Fortius," (Note: Classical Latin pronunciation: [ˈkɪ.ti.ʊs ˈaɫ.ti.ʊs ˈfɔr.ti.ʊs], Anglicised pronunciation [ˈsɪtiʌs ˈæltiʌs ˈfɔrtiʌs], SIT-ee-us ALT-ee-us FORT-ee-us) Latin for "Faster, Higher, Stronger" (also "Swifter, Higher, Stronger.") The motto was proposed by Pierre de Coubertin upon the creation of the IOC. Coubertin borrowed it from his friend Henri Didon, a Dominican priest who was an athletics enthusiast. Coubertin said that "these three words represent a programme of moral beauty. The aesthetics of sport are intangible". The motto was introduced at the 1924 Summer Olympics in Paris. Coubertin's Olympic ideals are expressed in the Olympic creed:

L'essentiel est de participer. L'important n'est pas de triompher, mais de lutter. L'essentiel n'est pas d'avoir vaincu, mais d'avoir bien combattu.

[The most important thing in the Olympic Games is not to win but to take part, just as the most important thing in life is not the triumph but the struggle. The essential thing is not to have conquered but to have fought well.]

— Pierre de Coubertin

Coubertin got this text from a sermon by Bishop of Central Pennsylvania Ethelbert Talbot, during the 1908 London Games.

In 2021, the IOC approved the addition of the word "together", after an en dash, to the motto. It now reads "Citius, Altius, Fortius – Communiter", Latin for "Faster, Higher, Stronger – Together" (French: "Plus vite, Plus haut, Plus fort – Ensemble"). According to some Italian Latinists, such as professor Mario De Nonno and professor Giorgio Piras, the concept of acting together is not properly conveyed by communis nor communiter. De Nonno suggested an adverb such as Una meaning "as one".

== Olympic Rings ==
Emblem of the Olympic Games ("Olympic Rings") Emblème des Jeux Olympiques ("Anneaux olympiques")
- Armiger: Kirsty Coventry, President of the International Olympic Committee
- Adopted: August 1913; 113 years ago
- Shield: Five interlocking rings, coloured blue, black, red, yellow, and green.
- Earlier version
- Use: 1986–2010, 1913–1986

The Olympic rings consist of five interlocking rings, coloured blue, yellow, black, green, and red on a white field. The symbol was originally created in 1913 by Coubertin. The official Olympic charter section 8 on the official Olympic website states: "The Olympic symbol expresses the activity of the Olympic Movement and represents the union of the five continents and the meeting of athletes from throughout the world at the Olympic Games." Coubertin originally meant the number of rings to "represent the five parts of the world now won over to Olympism." According to Coubertin, the colours of the rings, along with the white background, represented the colours of every competing country's flag at the time. Upon its initial introduction, Coubertin stated the following in the August 1913 edition of Olympique:

... the six colours [including the flag's white background] combined in this way reproduce the colours of every country without exception. The blue and yellow of Sweden, the blue and white of Greece, the tricolour flags of France, the United Kingdom, the United States, Germany, Belgium, Italy, and Hungary, and the yellow and red of Spain are included, as are the innovative flags of Brazil and Australia, and those of ancient Japan and modern China. This, truly, is an international emblem.

USFSA logo

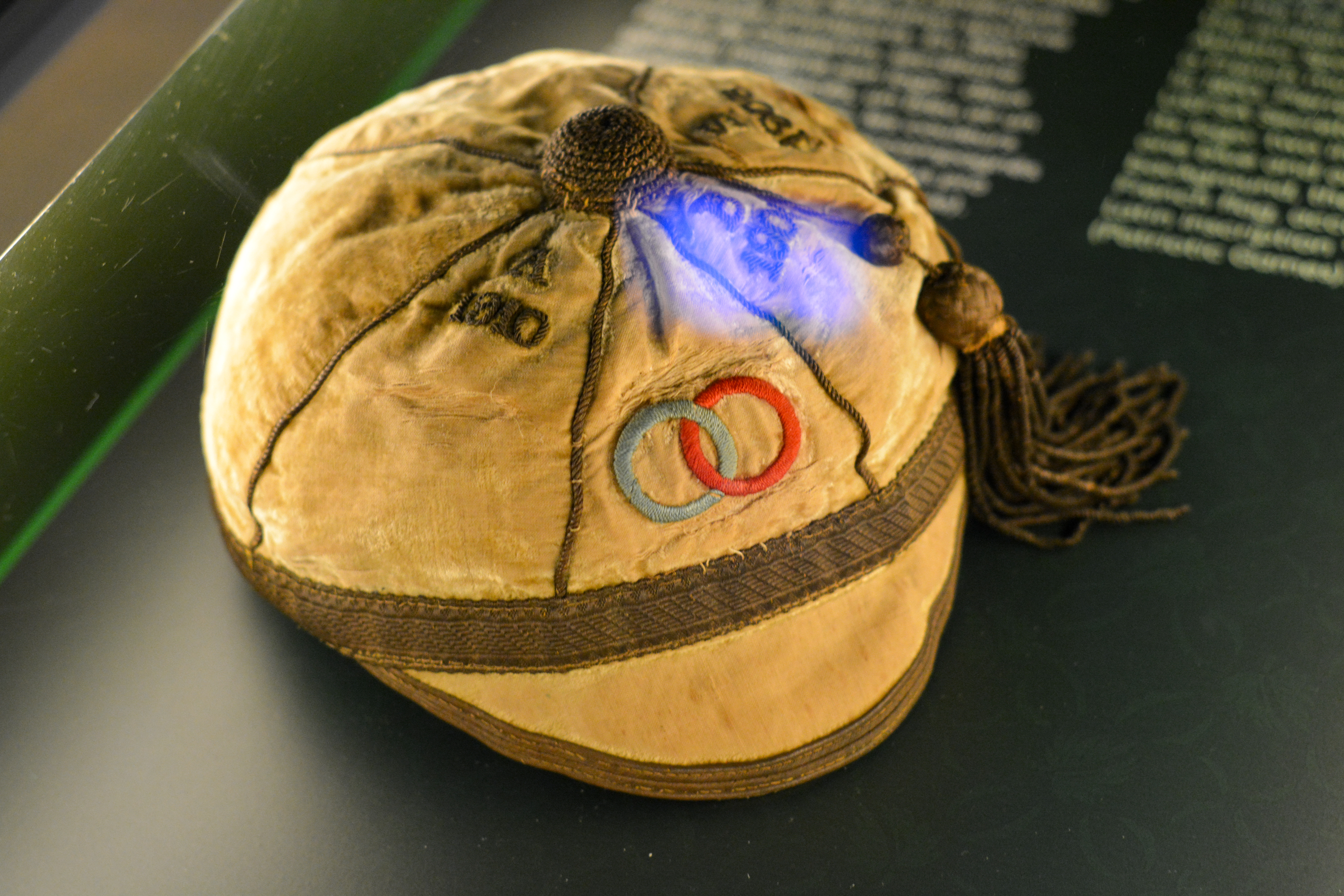
Competition cap of the Union des sociétés françaises de sports athlétiques. The two interlocking rings inspired the Olympic rings.

In his article published in November 1992 in the Olympic Revue, the official magazine of the IOC, American historian Robert Barney explained that the idea of the interlaced rings came to Coubertin when he was in charge of the USFSA. This association was founded by the union of two French sports associations and, until 1925, was responsible for representing the IOC in France. The emblem of the USFSA was two interlaced rings. Barney noted that Swiss psychiatrist Carl Jung considered circles to symbolise wholeness and that their linkage symbolized continuity.

The 1914 Olympic Congress was suspended due to the outbreak of World War I, so the symbol and flag officially debuted at the 1920 Summer Olympics in Antwerp, Belgium.

The symbol's popularity and widespread use began during the lead-up to the 1936 Summer Olympics in Berlin. Carl Diem, president of the organizing committee for the 1936 Summer Olympics, wanted to hold a torchbearers's ceremony in the stadium at Delphi, the site of the famous oracle where the Pythian Games were also held. For this reason, he ordered the construction of a milestone with the Olympic rings carved in the sides and that a torchbearer should carry the flame along with an escort of three others from there to Berlin. The ceremony was celebrated, but the stone was never removed. Later, American authors Lynn and Gray Poole, when visiting Delphi in the late 1950s, saw the stone and reported in their History of the Ancient Games that the Olympic rings design came from ancient Greece. This has become known as "Carl Diem's Stone". This created a myth that the symbol had an ancient Greek origin.

The current view of the IOC is that the symbol "reinforces the idea" that the Olympic Movement is international and welcomes all countries of the world to join. As can be read in the Olympic Charter, the Olympic symbol represents the union of the five continents of the world and the meeting of athletes from throughout the world at the Olympic Games. However, no continent is represented by any specific ring. The 1949–50 edition of the IOC's "Green Booklet" stated that each colour corresponded to a particular continent except for Antarctica: "blue for Europe, yellow for Asia, black for Africa, green for Australia, and red for North America and South America. This assertion was reversed in 1951 because there was no evidence that Coubertin had intended it: "at the very most he might perhaps have admitted it afterwards". Nevertheless, the pre–2014 logo of the Association of National Olympic Committees placed the logo of each of its five continental associations inside the ring of the corresponding colour.

An Olympic Rings emoji was added to WhatsApp on 24 July 2016 in version 2.16.7, it was later removed on 15 August 2016 in version 2.16.9. It consisted of five U+25EF ◯ LARGE CIRCLE characters joined with U+200D ZERO WIDTH JOINERs, forming a joined character sequence. This was presumably part of a temporary agreement with the International Olympic Committee.

== Different types of flags ==
The International Olympic Committee
- The Olympic rings
- Use: Sport
- Proportion: 2:3 or 1:2
- Adopted: 14 August 1920
- Design: Five interlaced rings of equal dimensions (the Olympic rings), used alone, in one or in five different colours. When used in its five-colour version, these colours shall be, from left to right, blue, yellow, black, green, and red. The rings are interlaced from left to right; the blue, black, and red rings are situated at the top, the yellow and green rings at the bottom in accordance with the above graphic reproduction.
- Designed by: Pierre de Coubertin

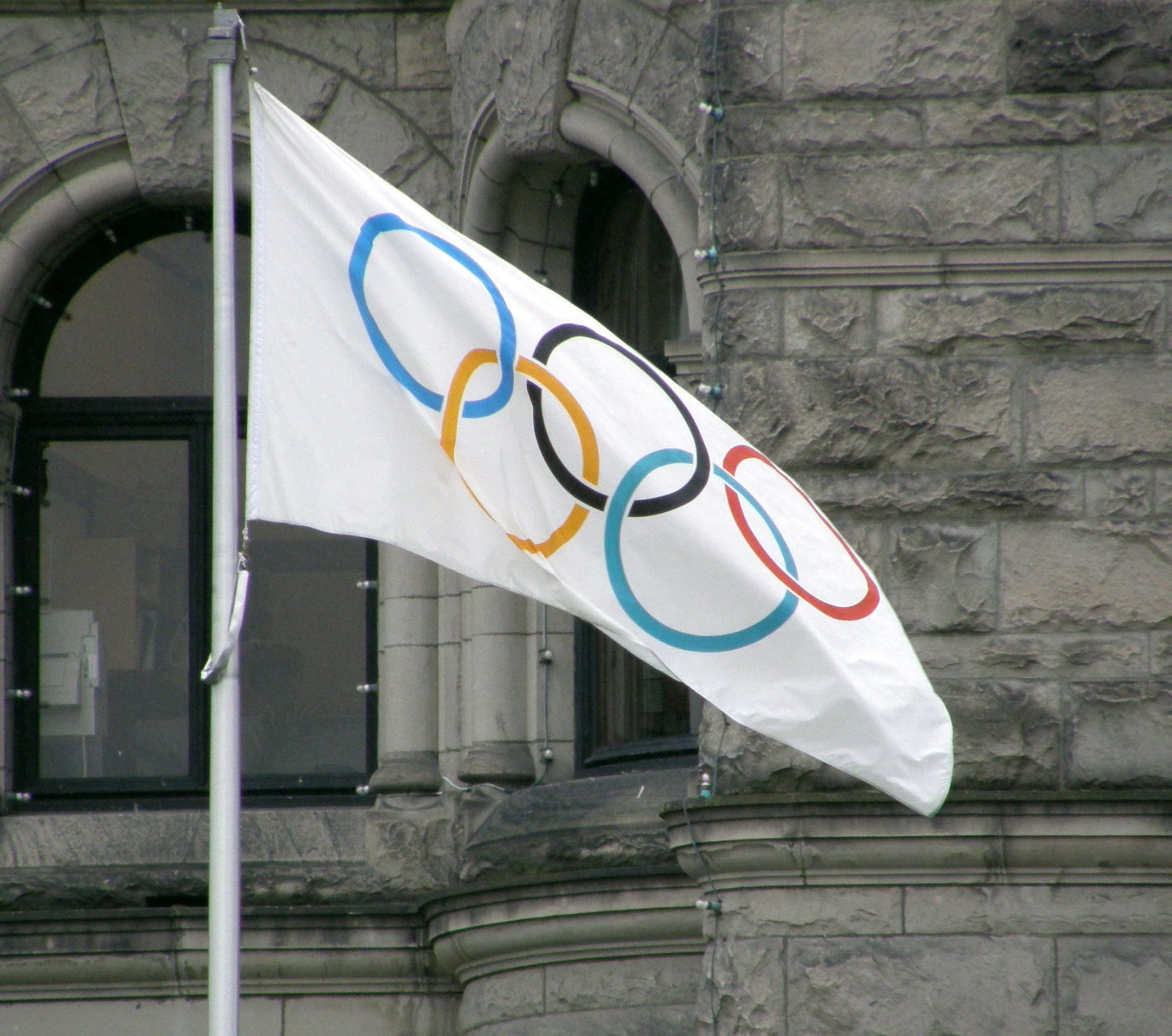
The Olympic flag flying in Victoria, British Columbia, Canada, as the province was the host of 2010 Winter Olympics held in Vancouver

Pierre de Coubertin created the Olympic flag in 1913.

The emblem selected to illustrate and represent the 1914 World Congress which was to place the final seal on the restoration of the Olympics began to appear on various preliminary documents: five rings linked at regular intervals, their various colors – blue, yellow, black, green and red – standing out against the white of the paper. These five rings represent the five parts of the world now won over to Olympism, ready to accept its fruitful rivalries. In addition, the six colours combined in this way reproduce the colours of every country without exception. The blue and yellow of Sweden, the blue and white of Greece, the tricolor flags of France, the United Kingdom, the United States, Germany, Belgium, Italy, and Hungary, and the yellow and red of Spain are included, as are the innovative flags of Brazil and Australia, and those of ancient Japan and modern China. This, truly, is an international emblem. It was made to be turned into a flag, and the look of the flag would be perfect. It is a light, appealing flag, a delight to see fluttering in the wind. Its meaning is largely symbolic. Its success is assured, to the point that after the Congress it can continue to be raised on solemn Olympic occasions.

— Pierre de Coubertin (1913)

=== Specific flags used ===
There are specific Olympic flags that are displayed by cities that will be hosting the next Olympic games. During each Olympic closing ceremony, in what is traditionally known as the Antwerp or Oslo Ceremony, the flag is passed from the mayor of one host city to the next host, where it will then be taken to the new host city and displayed at its city hall. These special flags should not be confused with the larger Olympic flags manufactured specifically for each Games, which are flown over the stadium during the duration of the Games and then retired. As there is no specific flag for this purpose, the flags flown over the stadiums generally have subtle differences. This includes minor colour variations, and more noticeably the presence (or lack) of white outlines around each ring.

==== Antwerp flag ====
During the opening ceremony of the 1920 Summer Olympics in Antwerp, Belgium, the Olympic flag with the five rings signifying the universality of the Olympic Games was raised for the first time at an Olympic Games. At the end of the Games, the flag could not be found and a new Olympic flag had to be made for the handover ceremony to the officials of the 1924 Summer Olympics in Paris. Despite it being a replacement, the IOC officially calls this the "Antwerp Flag" instead of the "Paris Flag". It was passed on to the next organising city of the Summer Olympics. The 1924 flag continued to be used at the Summer Olympics until the 1988 Summer Olympics in Seoul when it was retired and replaced by the Seoul flag.

In 1997, at a banquet hosted by the U.S. Olympic Committee, a reporter was interviewing Hal Haig Prieste who had won a bronze medal in platform diving as a member of the 1920 U.S. Olympic team. The reporter mentioned that the IOC had not been able to find out what had happened to the original Olympic flag. "I can help you with that," Prieste said, "It's in my suitcase." At the end of the Antwerp Olympics, spurred on by teammate Duke Kahanamoku, he climbed a flagpole and stole the Olympic flag. For 77 years the flag was stored away in the bottom of his suitcase. The flag was returned to the IOC by Prieste, by then 103 years old, in a special ceremony held at the 2000 Games in Sydney. The original flag raised at the Antwerp opening ceremony was placed on display at the Olympic Museum in Lausanne, Switzerland, with a plaque thanking Prieste for donating it. The flag returned to Antwerp in 2004 and since 2013, the year that Antwerp bore the title of European Sports Capital, the flag was displayed in the entrance hall of Antwerp's city hall. In 2017, however, the flag was stored in the collection of the MAS due to the renovation of the town hall.

While the flag is recognized by the IOC, critics and historians note that the returned flag is not the one that was used in the 1920 opening ceremony, as the original flag was much larger than the one returned by Prieste.

==== Oslo flag ====
The Oslo flag was presented to the IOC by the mayor of Oslo, Norway, during the 1952 Winter Olympics. Between 1952 and 2014, the flag was passed to the next organising city for the Winter Olympics, with its last appearance in Sochi at the 2014 Winter Olympics. For the 2010 Winter Olympics, the actual Oslo flag was kept in a special box that has brass plaques from all host cities attached to the inside of the beautifully decorated lid and available for public viewing at the Vancouver City Hall. It was replaced by the Pyeongchang flag.

==== Seoul flag ====
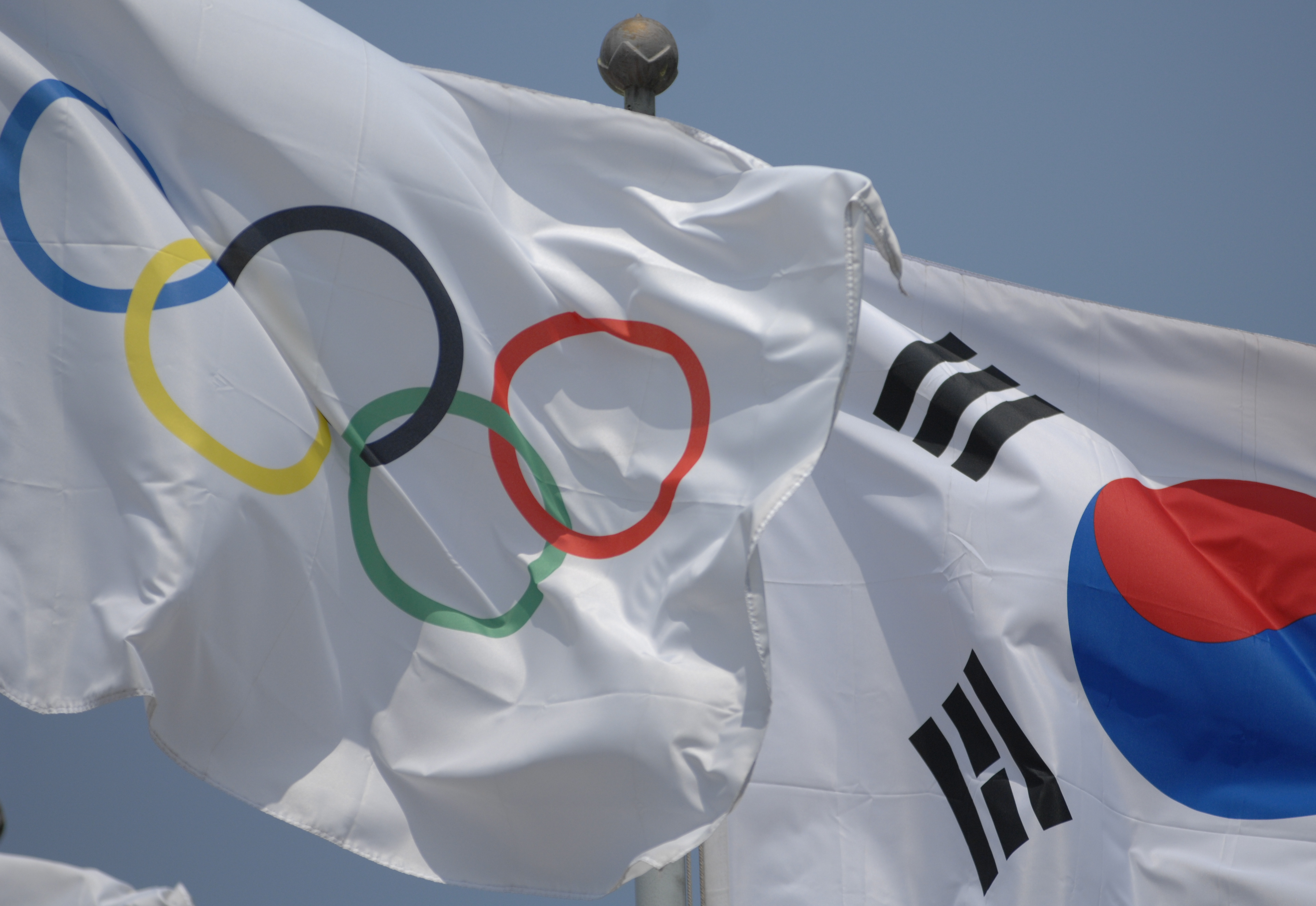
Flag of South Korea alongside an Olympic Flag in Olympic Park, Seoul

As a successor to the Antwerp Flag, the Seoul flag was presented to the IOC at the 1988 Summer Olympics by the city of Seoul, South Korea. It was passed on to the next organising cities of the Summer Olympics between 1988 and 2012. Its last appearance was in London at the 2012 Summer Olympics. It was replaced by the Rio de Janeiro flag.

==== Rio de Janeiro flag ====
As a successor to the Seoul Flag, the Rio de Janeiro flag was presented to the IOC at the 2016 Summer Olympics by the city of Rio de Janeiro, Brazil. It has since been passed to the next organising cities of the Summer Olympics.

==== Pyeongchang flag ====
As a successor to the Oslo Flag, the Pyeongchang flag was presented to the IOC at the 2018 Winter Olympics by the city of Pyeongchang, South Korea. It has since been passed to the next organizing city of the Winter Olympics.

==== Singapore flag ====
For the inaugural Youth Olympic Games, an Olympic flag was created for the junior version of the Games. The flag is similar to the Olympic flag, but has the host city and year on it and was first presented to Singapore by IOC president Jacques Rogge. During the closing ceremony on 26 August 2010, Singapore officials presented it to the next organising committee, Nanjing 2014.

==== Innsbruck flag ====
For the inaugural winter Youth Olympic Games, an Olympic flag was presented to the IOC at the 2012 Winter Youth Olympics by the city of Innsbruck, Austria. It has since been passed on to the next organising city of the Winter Youth Olympics.

== Flame and torch relay ==
The Olympic flame at Athens 2004 during the opening ceremony.

The modern tradition of moving the Olympic flame via a relay system from Greece to the Olympic venue began with the Berlin Games in 1936. The organizers in Nazi Germany thought to use the Olympic torch relay as a propaganda tool to link ancient Greek ideals with the modern German state. Today, the relay symbolizes peace and unity, with the International Olympic Committee overseeing its organization. Months before the Games are held, the Olympic flame is lit on a torch, with the rays of the sun concentrated by a parabolic reflector, at the site of the Ancient Olympics in Olympia, Greece. The torch is then taken out of Greece, most often to be taken around the country or continent where the Games are held. The Olympic torch is carried by athletes, leaders, celebrities, and ordinary people alike, and at times in unusual conditions, such as being electronically transmitted via satellite for Montreal 1976, submerged underwater without being extinguished for Sydney 2000, or in space and at the North Pole for Sochi 2014. On the final day of the torch relay, the day of the opening ceremony, the flame reaches the main stadium and is used to light a cauldron situated in a prominent part of the venue to signify the beginning of the Games.

== Medals and diplomas ==
Olympic medals and diplomas are awarded to the highest-finishing competitors in each event at the Olympic Games. The medals are made of gold-plated silver (for the gold medals), silver, or bronze, and are awarded to the top three finishers in a particular event. Each medal for an Olympiad has a common design, decided upon by the organisers for the particular games. For medals awarded at Summer Games, the obverse side has an image of Nike, the Greek goddess of victory, holding a palm in her left hand and a winner's crown in her right, and the Colosseum in Rome in the background. In contrast, at Winter Games the creators of the medals have complete freedom to choose their designs.

The original medal design, created by Giuseppe Cassioli, was used from the 1928 Summer Olympics to the 2000 Summer Olympics. The design underwent a drastic change for the 2004 Summer Olympics, when Cassioli's design was replaced by a more modern design connected to Greece. The obverse side was changed to make more explicit references to the Greek goddess and traditions. In this design, the goddess Nike flies into the grounds of the Panathenaic Stadium, symbolizing the renewal of the Games. The new design was created by Greek jewelry designer Elena Votsi.

For each Summer Olympics from 2004 onwards, the reverse side, as well as the labels for each Olympiad, were changed to reflect scenic images or locations from the host city.

Olympic diplomas are given to competitors placing fourth, fifth, and sixth since 1949, and to competitors placing seventh and eighth since 1981.

== Anthems ==
The "Olympic Hymn", officially known as the "Olympic Anthem", is played when the Olympic flag is raised. It was composed by Spyridon Samaras with words from a poem by the Greek poet and writer Kostis Palamas. Both the poet and the composer were the choice of Demetrius Vikelas, a Greek Pro-European and the first president of the IOC. The anthem was performed for the first time for the opening ceremony of the 1896 Athens Olympic Games but was not declared the official hymn by the IOC until 1958. In the following years, every hosting location commissioned the composition of a specific Olympic hymn for their edition of the Games until the 1960 Winter Olympics in Squaw Valley.

Other notable Olympic anthems and fanfares include:

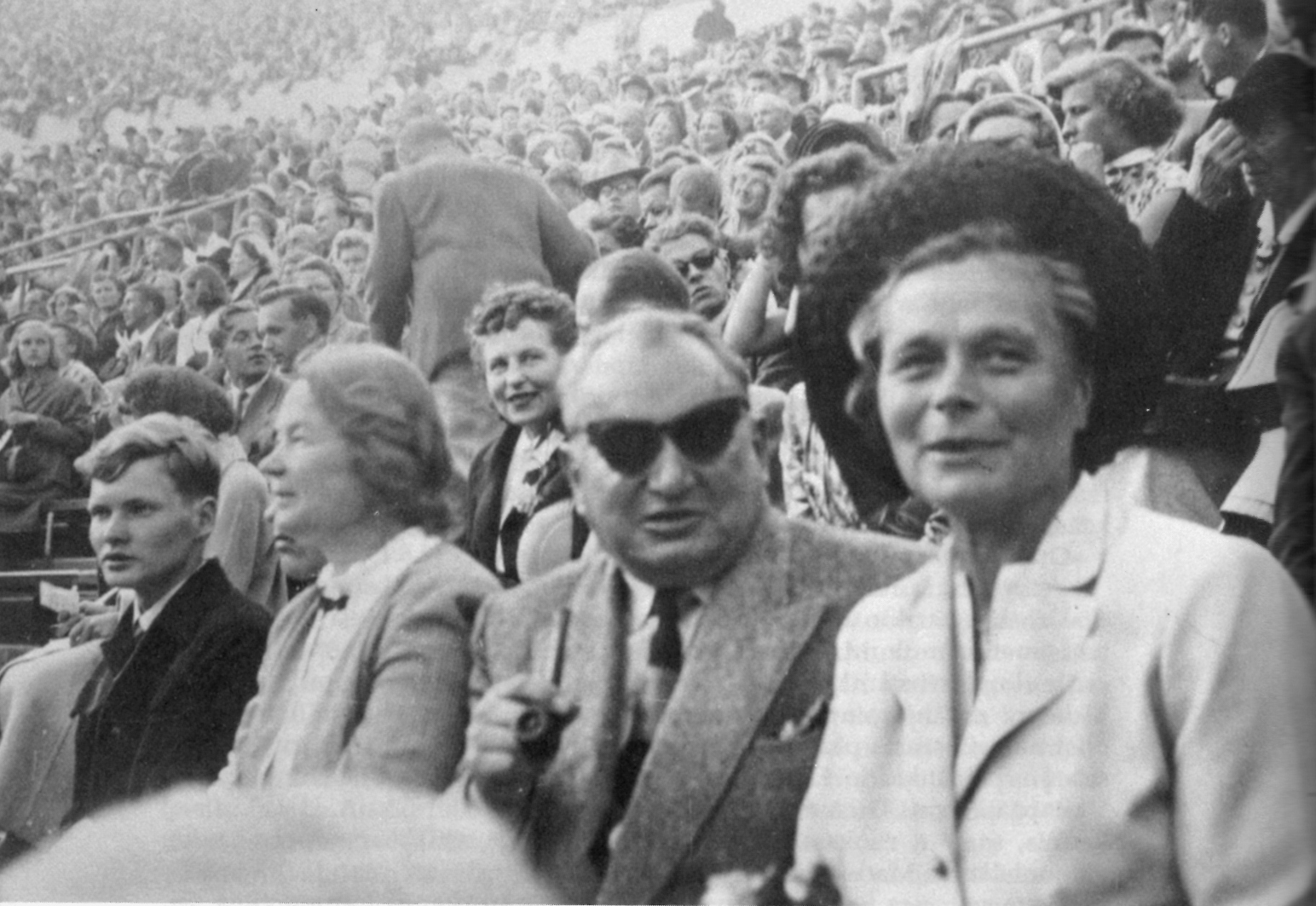
The composer of the 1952 Olympic Fanfare, Aarre Merikanto, at Helsinki Olympic Stadium during the games.

- "Olympische Hymne": A composition for orchestra and mixed chorus composed by Richard Strauss for the 1936 Berlin Summer Olympics.
- The "Olympic Fanfare" for the 1952 Helsinki Summer Olympics: this was originally composed by Aarre Merikanto for the 1940 Summer Olympics, which were cancelled. Merikanto's "Olympic Fanfare" won the fanfare contest organized in Finland in 1939, but the score was lost for over a decade. When rediscovered in 1951, it was decided to use it in 1952. It was recorded in 1953.
- "Bugler's Dream": Written in 1958 by Leo Arnaud as part of his Charge Suite. the theme is often thought of by Americans as the "Olympic Theme" due to its usage in television coverage by ABC and NBC, starting with the 1964 Olympics in Tokyo.
- The "Olympic March": The theme written by Yūji Koseki for the Tokyo 1964 Summer Olympics theme song.
- "Olympic Fanfare 1972": The winning submission for the Munich 1972 Summer Olympics theme song, used as the TV signature tune of the German Olympic Center (German: Deutsches Olympia-Zentrum) and the prelude to the medal ceremonies, composed by Herbert Rehbein. It was performed by the Orchestra of the Bavarian Broadcasting Company (German: Orchester des Bayerischen Rundfunks) and members of the Air Force Band Neubiberg, conducted by Willy Mattes.
- "Olympic Fanfare and Theme": Composed by John Williams for the Los Angeles 1984 Summer Olympics. The theme was performed in the opening ceremonies by the United States Army Herald Trumpets conducted by then-Captain David Deitrick. The first recording, performed by an orchestra composed of Los Angeles-area musicians, was released in its entirety on the LP and cassette album The Official Music of the XXIIIrd Olympiad Los Angeles 1984. There was a concurrent Japan-only CD release. The piece went on to win a Grammy in 1985. A slightly different arrangement of the piece was released on the Philips album By Request: The Best of John Williams and the Boston Pops Orchestra. In 1996, an alternate version of "Olympic Fanfare and Theme" was released on the album Summon the Heroes for the Atlanta Olympic Games, replacing the first part of the piece with Arnaud's "Bugler's Dream". The theme was used at the closing ceremony of the 2010 Winter Olympic Games as the countries' flagbearers entered the BC Place field surrounding the Olympic cauldron, and during the Oslo Ceremony when the Olympic flag was brought into the stadium by Vancouver Mayor Gregor Robertson.
- "The Olympic Spirit": The theme written by John Williams for the 1988 Olympics in Seoul and used in the corresponding NBC broadcasts.
- "Summon the Heroes": The theme written by John Williams for the 1996 Summer Olympics in Atlanta.
- "Theme from The Adventures of Brisco County, Jr.": The theme song to this television show, composed by Randy Edelman, was first used by NBC for teaser commercials and promo spots in 1996. It was retired following the 2016 Summer Olympics.
- "Call of the Champions": The theme written by John Williams for the 2002 Salt Lake Winter Olympics.

Several other composers have contributed Olympic music, including Henry Mancini, Francis Lai, Marvin Hamlisch, Philip Glass, David Foster, Mikis Theodorakis, Ryuichi Sakamoto, Vangelis, Basil Poledouris, Michael Kamen, and Mark Watters.

== Kotinos ==
The kotinos (Greek: κότινος), is an olive branch, originally of wild olive-tree, intertwined to form a circle or a horse-shoe, introduced by Heracles. In the ancient Olympic Games there were no gold, silver, or bronze medals. There was only one winner per event, crowned with an olive wreath made of wild olive leaves from a sacred tree near the temple of Zeus at Olympia. The victorious athletes were honored, feted, and praised. Their deeds were heralded and chronicled so that future generations could appreciate their accomplishments.

According to the Greek historian Herodotus, the Persian King Xerxes was interrogating some Arcadians after the Battle of Thermopylae. He inquired why there were so few Greek men defending Thermopylae. The answer was "All other men are participating in the Olympic Games". When asked "What is the prize for the winner?", he was told "an olive-wreath". Tigranes, one of his generals, replied "Good heavens! Mardonius, what kind of men are these against whom you have brought us to fight? Men who do not compete for possessions, but for honour."

In his play Plutus, the Greek playwright Aristophanes suggested that the wreath being made of wild olive instead of gold signified that Zeus hoards his gold for himself.

In later times, athletes were rewarded with a generous sum of money as well as the kotinos. The kotinos tradition was renewed specifically for the Athens 2004 Games, although in this case it was bestowed together with the gold medal. Apart from its use in the awards ceremonies, the kotinos was chosen as the 2004 Summer Olympics emblem.

== Olympic salute ==
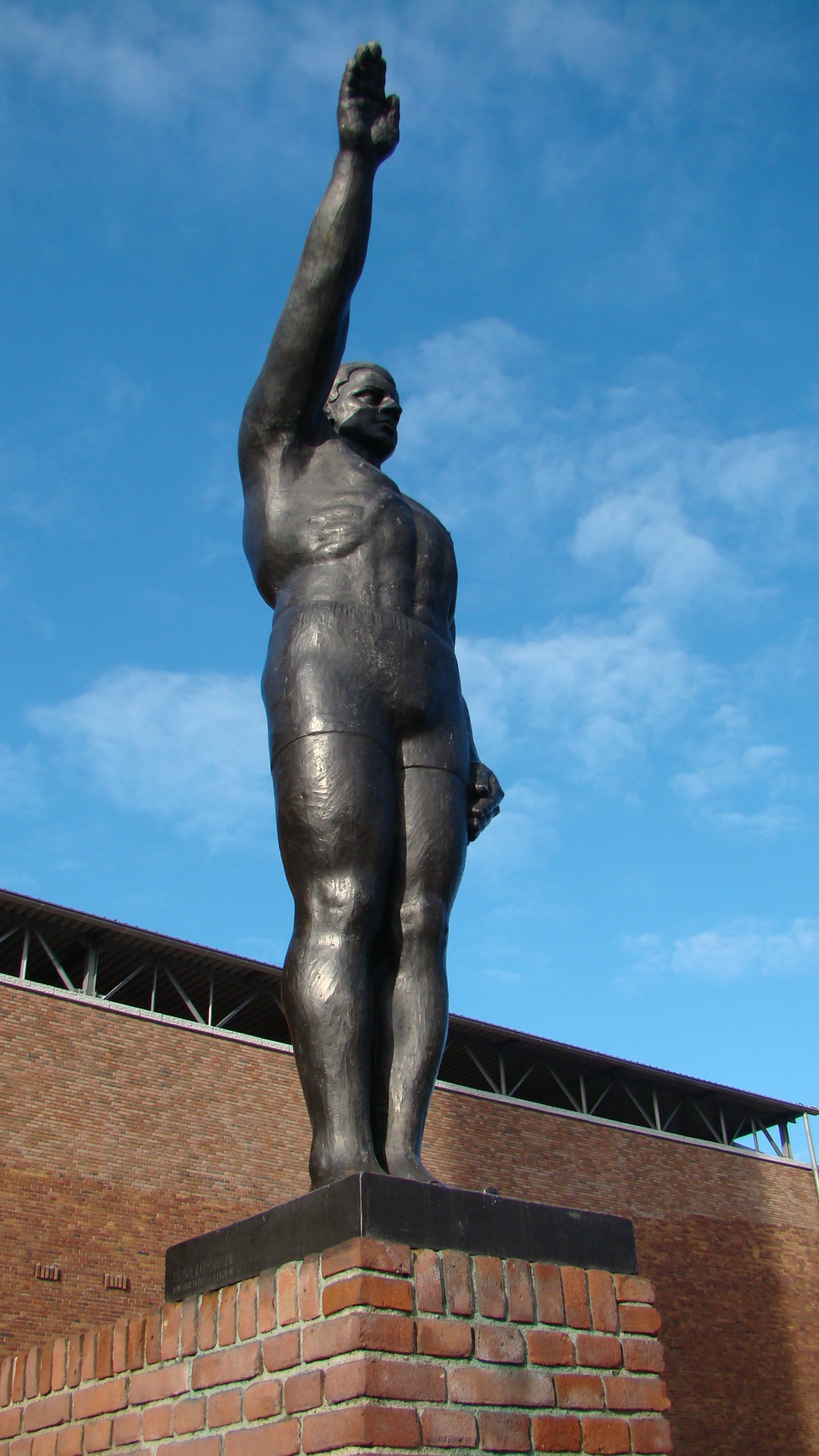
The Olympic Salute sculpted by Gra Rueb, sculpted for the 1928 Summer Olympics in Amsterdam

The Olympic salute is a variant of the Roman salute, with the right arm and hand stretched and pointing upward, the palm outward and downward, with the fingers touching. However, unlike the Roman salute, the arm is raised higher and at an angle to the right from the shoulder. The greeting is visible on the official posters of the Paris 1924 and Berlin 1936 games.

The Olympic salute has fallen out of use since World War II because of its resemblance to the Nazi salute. It was used by the French team at the opening ceremony of the 1948 Winter Olympics.

== Mascots ==
Since the 1968 Winter Olympics in Grenoble, France, the Olympic Games have had a mascot. This is usually an animal native to the area, or occasionally human figures representing the cultural heritage. The first major mascot in the Olympic Games was Misha at the 1980 Summer Olympics in Moscow. Misha was used extensively during the opening and closing ceremonies, as well as having a TV animated cartoon and appearing on several merchandise products. Nowadays, most of the merchandise aimed at young people focuses on the mascots, rather than the Olympic flag or organization logos.

== Intellectual property ==
The Olympic movement is very protective of its symbols. Many jurisdictions have given the movement exclusive trademark rights to any interlocking arrangement of five rings and usage of the word "Olympic". The rings are not eligible for copyright protection, both because of their date of creation and because five circles arranged in a pattern do not reach the threshold of originality required to be copyrighted.

The movement has taken action against numerous groups alleged to have violated their trademarks, including the Gay Games; the Minneapolis-based band The Hopefuls, formerly The Olympic Hopefuls; the Redneck Olympics or Redneck Games; Awana Clubs International, a Christian youth ministry who used the term for its competitive games; Wizards of the Coast, publisher at the time of the card game Legend of the Five Rings; and Philippine sporting good chain Olympic Village.

In 1938, the Norwegian brewery Frydenlund patented a label for its root beer which featured the five Olympic rings. In 1952, when Norway was to host the Winter Olympics, the Olympic Committee was notified by Norway's Patent Office that it was Frydenlund that owned the rights to the rings in that country. Today, the successor company Ringnes AS owns the rights to use the patented five rings on its root beer. In addition, a few other companies have been successful in using the Olympic name, such as Olympic Paint, which has a paintbrush in the form of a torch as its logo, and the former Greek passenger carrier Olympic Airlines. The airline was, however, obliged to distinguish its logo from the Olympic rings by adding a sixth ring.

Certain other sporting organisations and events have been granted permission by the IOC to use the word "Olympics" in their name, such as the Special Olympics, an international sporting event held every four years for people with intellectual disabilities.

The IOC maintains exclusive ownership and control of the use of Olympic symbols through an international treaty and the IOC's demand for the enactment of laws in hosting locations to grant special trademark protection to Olympic symbols. In 1981, the Nairobi Treaty on the Protection of the Olympic Symbol, a treaty administered by the World Intellectual Property Organization, was signed by fifty-two states. All fifty-two signatories to the Nairobi Treaty became obligated under the treaty to protect Olympic symbols against use for commercial purposes without authorization of the IOC. Under the Nairobi Treaty, if the IOC authorizes use of an Olympic symbol in a country that is a party to the treaty, then that country's National Olympic Committee is entitled to a portion of any revenue generated from the IOC's authorisation of use. The Nairobi Treaty provides for a framework of international intellectual property protection of the licensure of all Olympic symbols.

In recent years, organising committees have also demanded the passing of laws to combat ambush marketing by non-official sponsors during the Games. This was seen with the London Olympic Games and Paralympic Games Act 2006, which put heavy restrictions on using any term or imagery that could constitute an unauthorized association with the games, including mere mentioning of the host city and the year.

Bob Barney co-authored the book Selling the Five Rings (2002), with Stephen Wenn and Scott Martyn, which discussed the history of corporate sponsorships and television rights for the Olympic Games. Barney argued that the Olympic torch had been commercialised since its inception in 1936, and that sponsors of the torch relay benefit from brand awareness. In contrast, the medal podium ceremonies, which began in 1932, had not become commercialized since no advertising is allowed inside Olympic venues.

== See also ==
- Olympiadane
- Olympicene
- Paralympic symbols
- Pierre de Coubertin Medal
