= Lady (Jack Jones song) =

Single by Jack Jones

from the album Lady
- B-side: "Afraid To Love"
- Released: January 1967
- Recorded: Late 1966
- Genre: Pop; Easy listening
- Length: 2:42
- Label: Kapp; K-800
- Composers: Bert Kaempfert; Herbert Rehbein
- Lyricists: Larry Kusik; Charles Singleton

Jack Jones singles chronology
"A Day in the Life of a Fool" (1966)	"Lady" (1967)	"I'm Indestructible" (1967)

"Lady" is a song with lyrics by Larry Kusik and Charles Singleton and music by Bert Kaempfert and Herbert Rehbein. It was most notably performed by American singer Jack Jones who topped the Easy Listening charts with it.

== Release and reception ==
"Lady" was recorded by Jack Jones and released as a seven-inch single in early January 1967 by Kapp Records. It was backed by "Afraid To Love" on the other side. Following the success of "Lady", Jones recorded an album titled after the song, which included both recordings.

Cashbox reviewed the single in early January and stated that "No doubt Jack Jones will add another link to his long hit chain with this sweeping, entrancing romancer titled 'Lady.' The lushly orked tune gives Jones a full range to sing of the joys of true love. Ideal for many formats." They noted that "Afraid To Love" is "another moving romancer." Billboard believed that the "Big, beautiful Bert Kaempfert ballad with easy rhythm and string arrangement by Ralph Carmichael makes a perfect vehicle for Jones. In top vocal form, Jones will fast surpass his 'A Day in the Life of a Fool' hit".

== Chart performance ==
In March 1967, "Lady" spent four weeks at number 1 on the US Easy Listening chart, the final of three number-ones on the chart for Jones. It had also topped the Record World Top Non-Rock chart the same month. On the Billboard Hot 100, "Lady" peaked at number 39 and was Jones's final top 40 hit. On the Cashbox Top 100 Singles it was ranked higher at number 34, and lower on the Record World 100 Top Pops chart at number 43. It was ranked at number 3 on the AC chart's year-end Top 50 list.

== Charts ==
Chart performance for "Lady"
Chart (1967)	Peak position
US Billboard Hot 100	39
US Billboard Easy Listening	1
US Cashbox Top 100 Singles	34
US Record World 100 Top Pops	43
US Record World Top Non-Rock	1

== See also ==
- List of Billboard Easy Listening number ones of 1967
