= Herbert Rehbein =

- Born: 15 April 1922; Hamburg, Germany
- Died: 28 July 1979 (aged 57) Basel, Switzerland
- Genres: Light music
- Occupations: Songwriter, composer, arranger
- Instrument: Violin

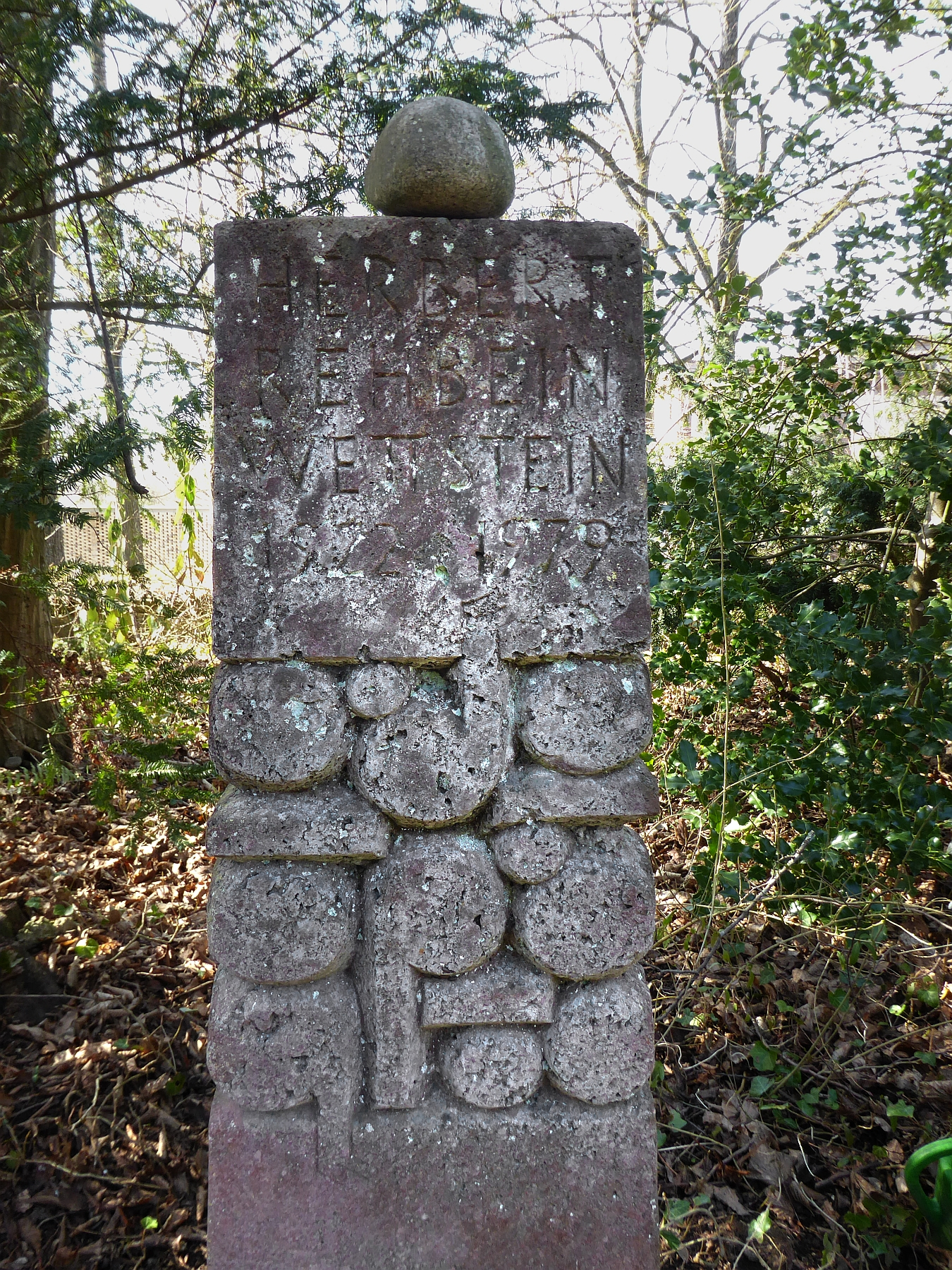

Herbert "Herb" Rehbein (15 April 1922 – 28 July 1979) was a German songwriter, composer and arranger of light orchestral music. Together with his friend and collaborator Bert Kaempfert, he was posthumously inducted into the Songwriters Hall of Fame in 1993.

== Biography ==
He was born in Hamburg, and studied classical violin and composition at the Hamburger Konservatorium. At the age of 19 he was conscripted into the German Army, but was assigned to the Music Corps and stationed in Crete. Later, he became a prisoner of war in Belgrade, where he stayed after the end of the war. There he became musical director of the Belgrade Radio Orchestra, until he left Yugoslavia in 1952.

Returning to Germany, he worked as composer, arranger and violinist with radio orchestras, and met fellow musician and songwriter Bert Kaempfert. The pair became friends and songwriting partners, encouraged by Milt Gabler of Decca Records. Several of their songs together, including "Lady," "The World We Knew (Over and Over)," and "Sweet Maria," became international successes and were recorded by such singers as Frank Sinatra, Sammy Davis Jr., Dean Martin and Al Martino. He produced three albums of instrumentals with his own orchestra, including Music to Soothe That Tiger (1964), in a highly romantic style. He also won the competition to provide the Olympic Fanfare for the 1972 Summer Olympics.

He died of cancer in Basel, Switzerland, in 1979 at the age of 57.
