= Cannizzaro (disambiguation) =

Stanislao Cannizzaro (1826–1910) was an Italian chemist.

Cannizzaro or Cannizaro may also refer to:

- Cannizzaro (surname), people with the name
- Cannizzaro (crater), a lunar crater named after Stanislao Cannizzaro
- Cannizaro Park, a public park in Wimbledon, London
- Cannizzaro reaction, a chemical reaction named after Stanislao Cannizzaro
