= Chemical nomenclature =

Systematic naming of chemical compounds

Chemical nomenclature is a set of rules to generate systematic names for chemical compounds. The nomenclature used most frequently in academia is the one created and developed by the International Union of Pure and Applied Chemistry (IUPAC). While there have been efforts to create one standardized internationally recognized system in chemical education various industries have not adopted IUPAC. Other systems used by various industries include the International Nomenclature Cosmetic Ingredient (INCI) system, and the American Chemical Society's CAS numbers. Various mixtures, fractions, grades, and dilutions based on raw material processing and industry needs has led to internal company specific systems.

== Purpose of chemical nomenclature ==
The main purpose of chemical nomenclature is to disambiguate the spoken or written names of chemical compounds: each name should refer to one compound. Secondarily, each compound should have only one name, although in some cases some alternative names are accepted.

Preferably, the name should also represent the structure or chemistry of a compound. This is achieved by the International Chemical Identifier (InChI) nomenclature. However, the American Chemical Society's CAS numbers nomenclature does not represent a compound's structure.

The nomenclature used depends on the needs of the user, so no single correct nomenclature exists. Rather, different nomenclatures are appropriate for different circumstances.

A common name will successfully identify a chemical compound, given context. Without context, the name should indicate at least the chemical composition. To be more specific, the name may need to represent the three-dimensional arrangement of the atoms. This requires adding more rules to the standard IUPAC system (the Chemical Abstracts Service system (CAS system) is the one used most commonly in this context), at the expense of having names which are longer and less familiar.

The IUPAC system is often criticized for failing to distinguish relevant compounds (for example, for differing reactivity of sulfur allotropes, which IUPAC does not distinguish). While IUPAC has a human-readable advantage over CAS numbering, IUPAC names for some larger, relevant molecules (such as rapamycin) are barely human-readable, so common names are used instead.

== Differing needs of chemical nomenclature and lexicography ==
It is generally understood that the purposes of lexicography versus chemical nomenclature vary and are to an extent at odds. Dictionaries of words, whether in traditional print or on the internet, collect and report the meanings of words as their uses appear and change over time. For internet dictionaries with limited or no formal editorial process, definitions —in this case, definitions of chemical names and terms— can change rapidly without concern for the formal or historical meanings. Chemical nomenclature however (with IUPAC nomenclature) is necessarily more restrictive: Its purpose is to standardize communication and practice so that, when a chemical term is used it has a fixed meaning relating to chemical structure, thereby giving insights into chemical properties and derived molecular functions. These differing purposes can affect understanding, especially with regard to chemical classes that have achieved popular attention. Examples of the effect of these are as follows:

- resveratrol, a single compound defined clearly by this common name, but that can be confused, popularly, with its cis-isomer,
- omega-3 fatty acids, a reasonably well-defined class of chemical structures that is nevertheless broad as a result of its formal definition, and
- polyphenols, a fairly broad structural class with a formal definition, but where mistranslations and general misuse of the term relative to the formal definition has resulted in serious errors of usage, and so ambiguity in the relationship between structure and activity (SAR).

The rapid pace at which meanings can change on the internet, in particular for chemical compounds with perceived health benefits, ascribed rightly or wrongly, complicates the monosemy of nomenclature (and so access to SAR understanding). Specific examples appear in the Polyphenol article, where varying internet and common-use definitions conflict with any accepted chemical nomenclature connecting polyphenol structure and bioactivity.

== History ==
=== Alchemical names ===
The nomenclature of alchemy is descriptive, but does not effectively represent the functions mentioned above. Opinions differ about whether this was deliberate on the part of the early practitioners of alchemy or whether it was a consequence of the particular (and often esoteric) theories according to which they worked. While both explanations are probably valid to some extent, it is remarkable that the first "modern" system of chemical nomenclature appeared at the same time as the distinction (by French chemist Antoine Lavoisier) between elements and compounds, during the late eighteenth century.

=== Méthode de nomenclature chimique ===
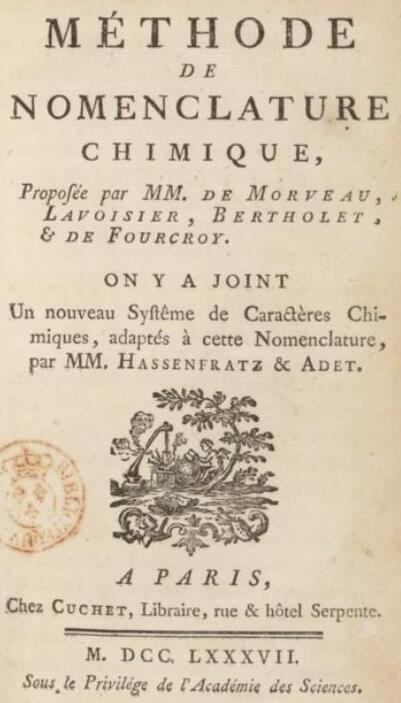
Title page of Méthode de nomenclature chimique.

The French chemist Louis-Bernard Guyton de Morveau published his recommendations in 1782, hoping that his "constant method of denomination" would "help the intelligence and relieve the memory". The system was refined in Méthode de nomenclature chimique, published in 1787 in collaboration with Lavoisier, Claude Louis Berthollet, and Antoine-François de Fourcroy, and translated into English as Method of Chymical Nomenclature by James St. John in 1788. Méthode de nomenclature chimique contained handy dictionaries in which older chemical names were listed with their new counterparts and vice versa. New names were provided in both French and Latin for the benefit of an international readership. For a modern reader these dictionaries are still useful, but now to discover and understand older names, rather than the new. In the English version, the new names had been adapted to English, though they did not always align with current conventions. St. John used "acetat" instead of "acetate" for example. For gases, the word "gas" ("gaz") was being popularized by its consistent use in the new names, whereas the old names used the affix "air".

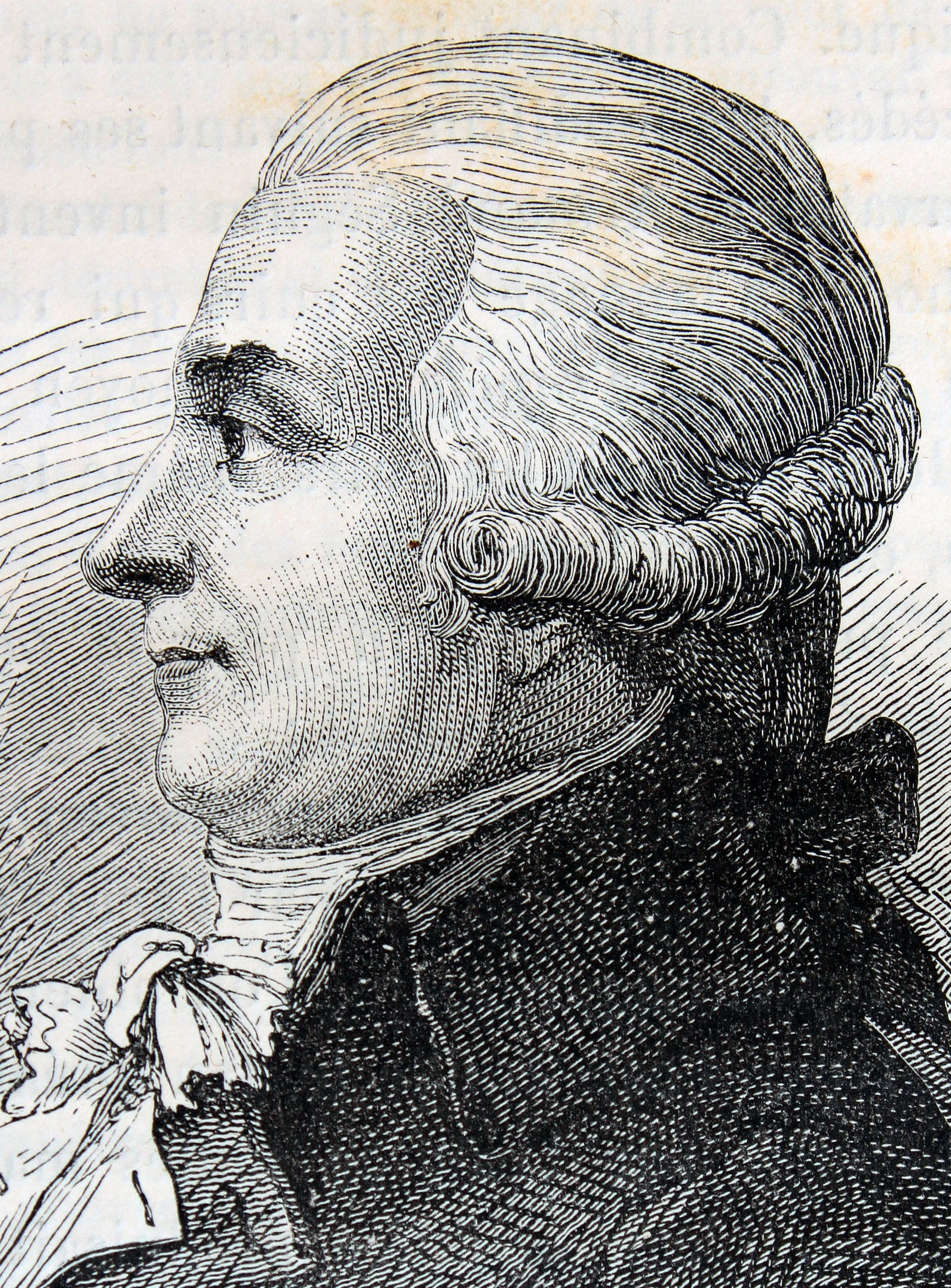
Louis-Bernard Guyton de Morveau

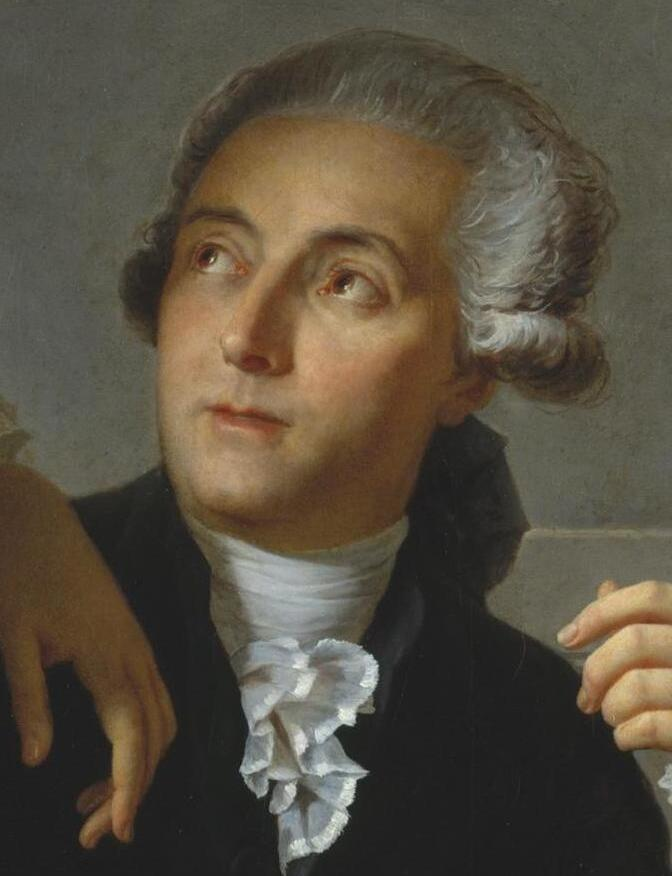
Antoine Lavoisier

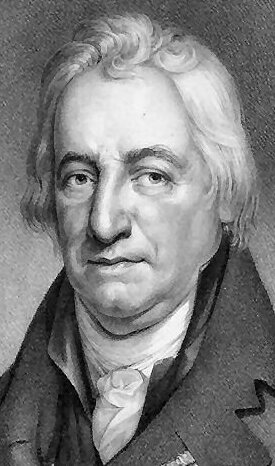
Claude Louis Berthollet

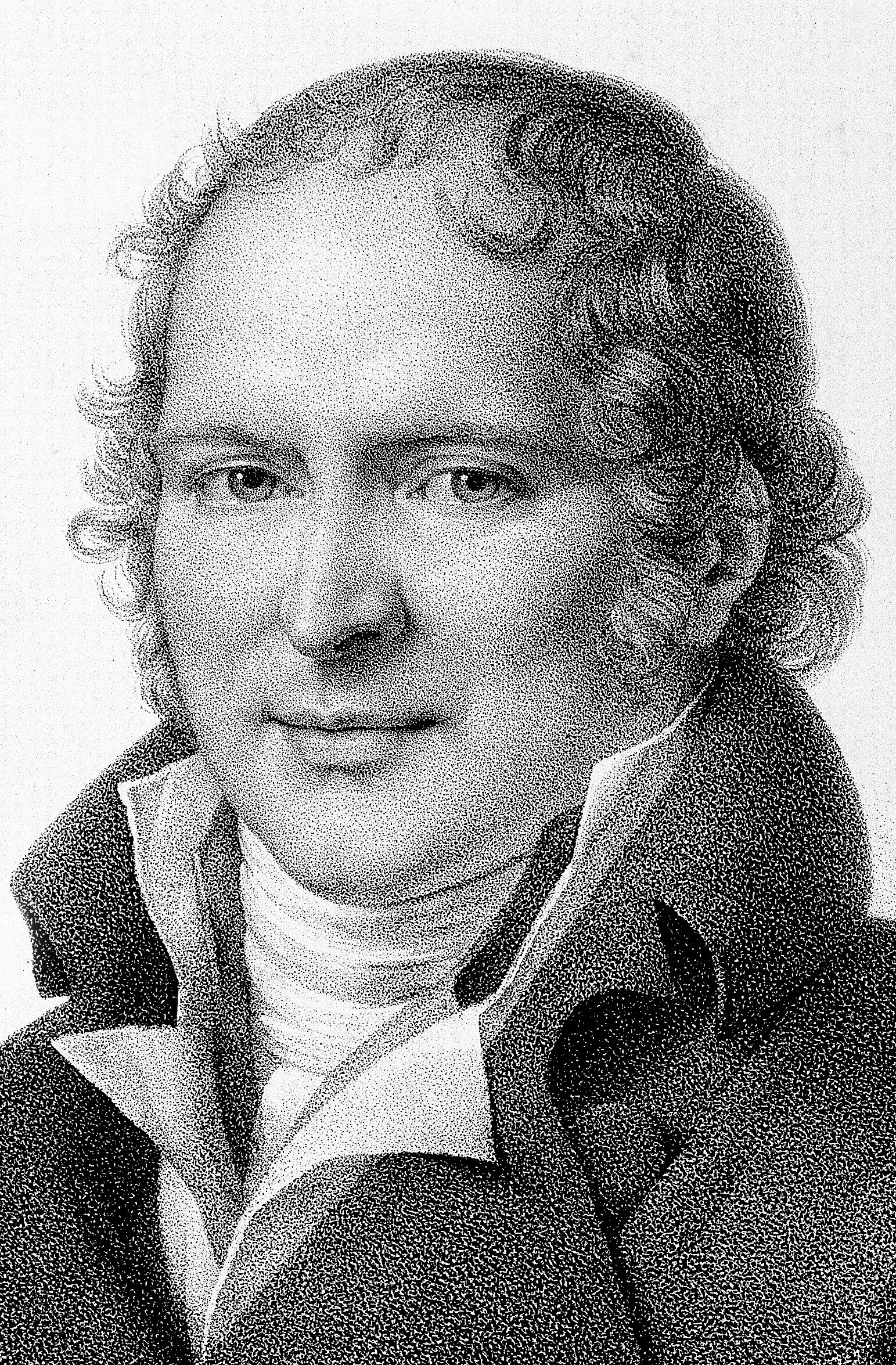
Antoine François de Fourcroy

The authors of Méthode de nomenclature chimique.

=== Traité élémentaire de chimie ===
The new system was presented to a wider audience in Lavoisier's 1789 textbook Traité élémentaire de chimie, translated into English as Elements of Chemistry by Robert Kerr in 1790, and it would be of great influence long after his death at the guillotine in 1794. The project was also endorsed by Swedish chemist Jöns Jakob Berzelius, who adapted the ideas for the German-speaking world.

Traité élémentaire de chimie included the first modern list of elements ("simple substances"). Also here were older names provided to explain their new counterparts. Some element names were new and received English versions similar to the French names. For the new "element" caloric, both the new and some of the "old" names (igneous fluid and matter of fire and of heat) were coined by Lavoisier, their discoverer. Most element names, however, were not new, so they retained their existing English versions. But their status as elements was new—a product of the chemical revolution.

=== Geneva Rules ===
The recommendations of Guyton were only for what would later be known as inorganic compounds. With the massive expansion of organic chemistry during the mid-nineteenth century and the greater understanding of the structure of organic compounds, the need for a less ad hoc system of nomenclature was felt just as the theoretical basis became available to make this possible. An international conference was convened in Geneva in 1892 by the national chemical societies, from which the first widely accepted proposals for standardization developed.

=== IUPAC ===
A commission was established in 1913 by the Council of the International Association of Chemical Societies, but its work was interrupted by World War I. After the war, the task passed to the newly formed International Union of Pure and Applied Chemistry, which first appointed commissions for organic, inorganic, and biochemical nomenclature in 1921 and continues to do so to this day.

== Types of nomenclature ==
Nomenclature has been developed for both organic and inorganic chemistry. There are also designations having to do with structure – see Descriptor (chemistry).

=== Organic chemistry ===
- Additive name
- Conjunctive name
- Functional class name, also known as a radicofunctional name
- Fusion name
- Hantzsch–Widman nomenclature
- Multiplicative name
- Replacement name
- Substitutive name
- Subtractive name

=== Inorganic chemistry ===
==== Compositional nomenclature ====
===== Type-I ionic binary compounds =====
For type-I ionic binary compounds, the cation (a metal in most cases) is named first, and the anion (usually a nonmetal) is named second. The cation retains its elemental name (e.g., iron or zinc), but the suffix of the nonmetal changes to -ide. For example, the compound LiBr is made of Li^{+} cations and Br^{−} anions; thus, it is called lithium bromide. The compound BaO, which is composed of Ba^{2+} cations and O^{2−} anions, is referred to as barium oxide.

The oxidation state of each element is unambiguous. When these ions combine into a type-I binary compound, their equal-but-opposite charges are neutralized, so the compound's net charge is zero.

===== Type-II ionic binary compounds =====
Type-II ionic binary compounds are those in which the cation does not have just one oxidation state. This is common among transition metals. To name these compounds, one must determine the charge of the cation and then render the name as would be done with Type-I ionic compounds, except that a Roman numeral (indicating the charge of the cation) is written in parentheses next to the cation name (this is sometimes referred to as Stock nomenclature). For example, for the compound FeCl_{3}, the cation, iron, can occur as Fe^{2+} and Fe^{3+}. In order for the compound to have a net charge of zero, the cation must be Fe^{3+} so that the three Cl^{−} anions can be balanced (3+ and 3− balance to 0). Thus, this compound is termed iron(III) chloride. Another example could be the compound PbS_{2}. Because the S^{2−} anion has a subscript of 2 in the formula (giving a 4− charge), the compound must be balanced with a 4+ charge on the Pb cation (lead can form cations with a 4+ or a 2+ charge). Thus, the compound is made of one Pb^{4+} cation to every two S^{2−} anions, the compound is balanced, and its name is written as lead(IV) sulfide.

An older system – relying on Latin names for the elements – is also sometimes used to name Type-II ionic binary compounds. In this system, the metal (instead of a Roman numeral next to it) has a suffix "-ic" or "-ous" added to it to indicate its oxidation state ("-ous" for lower, "-ic" for higher). For example, the compound FeO contains the Fe^{2+} cation (which balances out with the O^{2−} anion). Since this oxidation state is lower than the other possibility (Fe^{3+}), this compound is sometimes called ferrous oxide. For the compound, SnO_{2}, the tin ion is Sn^{4+} (balancing out the 4− charge on the two O^{2−} anions), and because this is a higher oxidation state than the alternative (Sn^{2+}), this compound is termed stannic oxide.

Some ionic compounds contain polyatomic ions, which are charged entities containing two or more covalently bonded types of atoms. It is important to know the names of common polyatomic ions; these include:

- ammonium (NH_{4})^{+}
- nitrite (NO_{2})^{−}
- nitrate (NO_{3})^{−}
- sulfite (SO_{3})^{2−}
- sulfate (SO_{4})^{2−}
- hydrogen sulfate (bisulfate) (HSO_{4})^{−}
- hydroxide (OH)^{−}
- cyanide (CN)^{−}
- phosphate (PO_{4})^{3−}
- hydrogen phosphate (HPO_{4})^{2−}
- dihydrogen phosphate (H_{2}PO_{4})^{−}
- carbonate (CO_{3})^{2−}
- hydrogen carbonate (bicarbonate) (HCO_{3})^{−}
- hypochlorite (ClO)^{−}
- chlorite (ClO_{2})^{−}
- chlorate (ClO_{3})^{−}
- perchlorate (ClO_{4})^{−}
- acetate (C_{2}H_{3}O_{2})^{−}
- permanganate (MnO_{4})^{−}
- dichromate (Cr_{2}O_{7})^{2−}
- chromate (CrO_{4})^{2−}
- peroxide (O_{2})^{2−}
- superoxide (O_{2})^{−}
- oxalate (C_{2}O_{4})^{2−}
- hydrogen oxalate (HC_{2}O_{4})^{−}

The formula Na_{2}SO_{3} denotes that the cation is sodium, or Na^{+}, and that the anion is the sulfite ion (SO_{3})^{2−}. Therefore, this compound is named sodium sulfite. If the given formula is Ca(OH)_{2}, it can be seen that OH^{−} is the hydroxide ion. Since the charge on the calcium ion is 2+, it makes sense there must be two OH^{−} ions to balance the charge. Therefore, the name of the compound is calcium hydroxide. If one is asked to write the formula for copper(I) chromate, the Roman numeral indicates that copper ion is Cu^{+} and one can identify that the compound contains the chromate ion (CrO_{4})^{2−}. Two of the 1+ copper ions are needed to balance the charge of one 2− chromate ion, so the formula is Cu_{2}CrO_{4}.

===== Type-III binary compounds =====
Type-III binary compounds are bonded covalently. Covalent bonding occurs between nonmetal elements. Compounds bonded covalently are also known as molecules. For the compound, the first element is named first and with its full elemental name. The second element is named as if it were an anion (base name of the element + -ide suffix). Then, prefixes are used to indicate the numbers of each atom present: these prefixes are mono- (one), di- (two), tri- (three), tetra- (four), penta- (five), hexa- (six), hepta- (seven), octa- (eight), nona- (nine), and deca- (ten). The prefix mono- is never used with the first element. Thus, NCl_{3} is termed nitrogen trichloride, BF_{3} is termed boron trifluoride, and P_{2}O_{5} is termed diphosphorus pentoxide (although the a of the prefix penta- should actually not be omitted before a vowel: the IUPAC Red Book 2005 page 69 states, "The final vowels of multiplicative prefixes should not be elided (although "monoxide", rather than "monooxide", is an allowed exception because of general usage).").

Carbon dioxide is written CO_{2}; sulfur tetrafluoride is written SF_{4}. A few compounds, however, have common names that prevail. H_{2}O, for example, is usually termed water rather than dihydrogen monoxide, and NH_{3} is preferentially termed ammonia rather than nitrogen trihydride.

==== Substitutive nomenclature ====
This naming method generally follows established IUPAC organic nomenclature. Hydrides of the main group elements (groups 13–17) are given the base name ending with -ane, e.g. borane (BH_{3}), oxidane (H_{2}O), phosphane (PH_{3}) (Although the name phosphine is also in common use, it is not recommended by IUPAC). The compound PCl_{3} would thus be named substitutively as trichlorophosphane (with chlorine "substituting"). However, not all such names (or stems) are derived from the element name. For example, NH_{3} is termed "azane".

==== Additive nomenclature ====
This method of naming has been developed principally for coordination compounds, although it can be applied more widely. An example of its application is [CoCl(NH_{3})_{5}]Cl_{2}, pentaamminechloridocobalt(III) chloride.

Ligands, too, have a special naming convention. Whereas chloride becomes the prefix chloro- in substitutive naming, for a ligand it becomes chlorido-.

== See also ==
- Descriptor (chemistry)
- International Chemical Identifier
- IUPAC nomenclature for organic chemical transformations
- IUPAC nomenclature of inorganic chemistry 2005
- IUPAC nomenclature of organic chemistry
- IUPAC numerical multiplier
- List of chemical compounds with unusual names
- Preferred IUPAC name
