= Cannizzaro (surname) =

Cannizzaro, less commonly Cannizaro, is a Sicilian surname, either derived from a place name near Catania or from Cañizo, Spain. Notable people with the name include:

- Andy Cannizaro (born 1978), American former baseball player
- Chris Cannizzaro (1938–2016), American baseball player and coach
- Jessie Cannizzaro, American actress
- Johnny Cannizzaro, American actor, screenwriter, playwright and musician
- Johnny Cannizzaro (sport shooter) (born 1949), Puerto Rican sports shooter
- Massimo Cannizzaro (born 1981), German football coach and former player
- Nicole Cannizzaro (born 1983), American politician
- Stanislao Cannizzaro (1826–1910), Italian chemist

== See also ==
- Cannizzaro (disambiguation)
