= Geneva Rules =

1892 organic chemistry naming rules

The Geneva Rules are the rules established by the International Chemistry Committee in 1892. These rules were the beginning of international cooperation for organic chemistry nomenclature. They were decided upon by a group of 34 of leading chemists from 9 different European nations. Their goal was to provide rules for the naming of aliphatic compounds, some of which are still in place today such as the longest chain provides the parent name and a functional group is indicated by a suffix. They also intended to extend the rules to include naming schemes for cyclic compounds however this did not occur.

== The rules ==
The Geneva rules for nomenclature were described in 62 paragraphs. Some of these rules were:

- Saturated hydrocarbons would have names ending in -ane.
- The traditional names of the first 4 in the series was to be kept (methane, ethane, propane and butane)
- Longer chains were to have their names derived from the appropriate Greek numeral e.g. pent (pentane), hex (hexane) etc.
- When naming compounds with side chains the name would be determined by the longest straight chain with a substituted group e.g. methyl propane (CH_{3}CH(CH_{3})CH_{3})
- The endings ene and yne were indicative of the presence of a double and triple bond respectively.
- For closed chain hydrocarbons the term "cyclo" was to be used meaning what was known as hexamethylene (C_{6}H_{12}) would now be called cyclohexane

== Attendees ==
(incomplete) list of attendees
Name	City
Ph. Barbier	Lyons
E.Paterno	Palermo
C.Graebe	Geneva
A Von Baeyer	Munich
S. Cannizzaro	Rome
Ch.Friedel	Paris
A. Lieben	Vienna
J.Gladstone	London
A.Cossa	Turin
W. M. Ramsay	London
H.Armstron	London
A.Haller	Nancy
P.Cazeneuve	Lyons
E. Fischer	Wurzburg
A. Le Bel	Paris
