= Cañizo =

Coordinates: 41°46′N 5°30′W

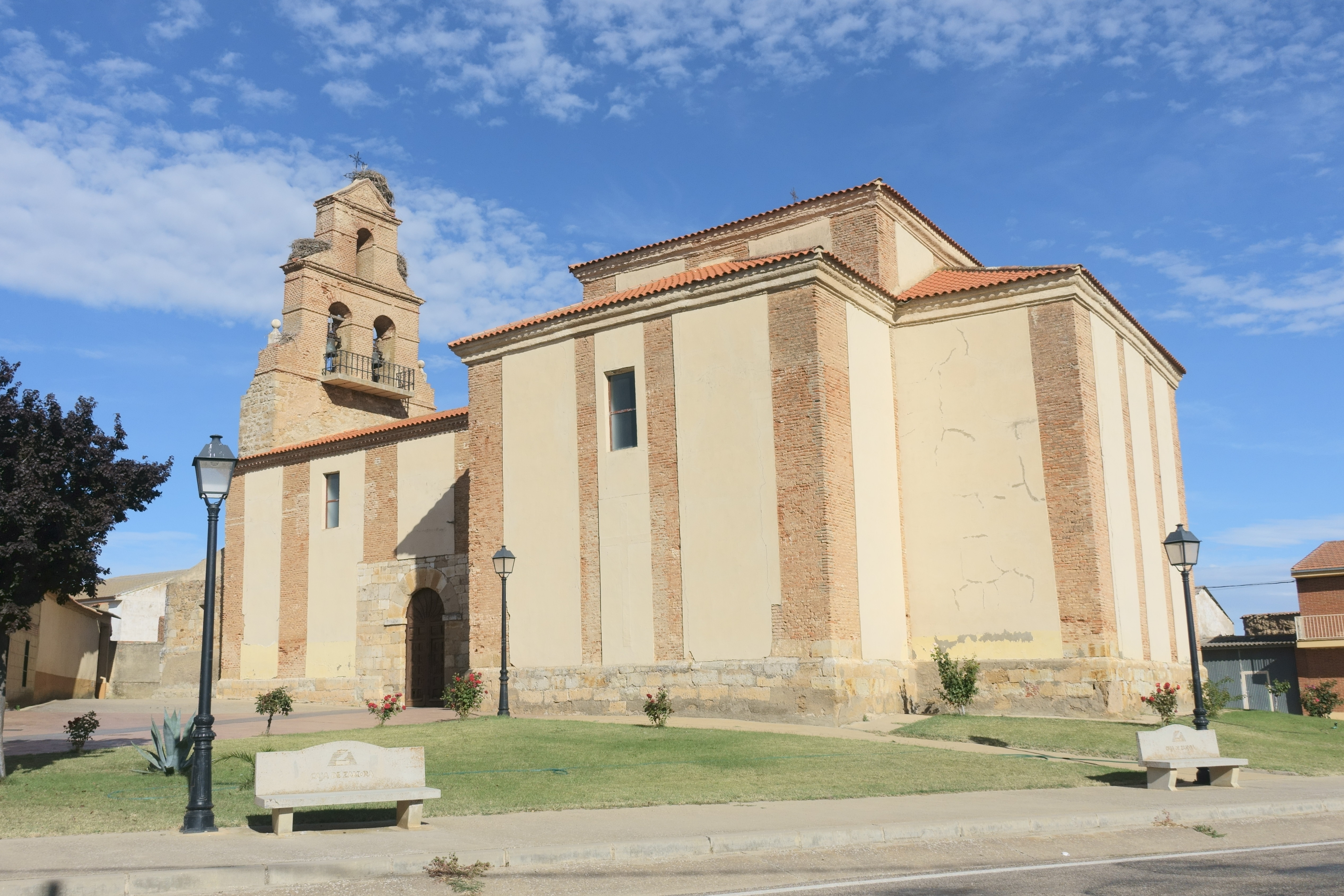

- Flag Coat of arms
- Interactive map of Cañizo
- Country: Spain
- Autonomous community: Castile and León
- Province: Zamora
- Municipality: Cañizo

Area
  - Total: 42 km^{2} (16 sq mi)

Population (2025-01-01)
  - Total: 197
  - Density: 4.7/km^{2} (12/sq mi)
- Time zone: UTC+1 (CET)
  - Summer (DST): UTC+2 (CEST)

Cañizo, full name: Cañizo de Campos, is a municipality located in the province of Zamora, Castile and León, Spain. According to the 2009 census (INE), the municipality had a population of 276 inhabitants.
