= Cannizzaro (crater) =

Crater on the Moon

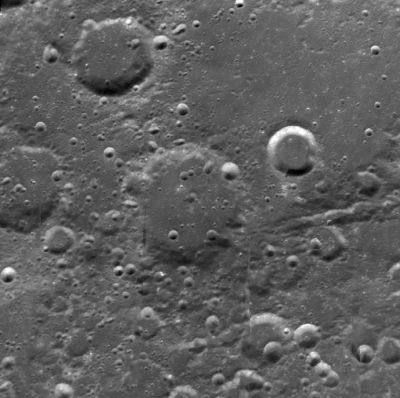
- Clementine mosaic
- Coordinates: 55.50°N 99.73°E
- Diameter: 54.51 km (33.87 mi)
- Depth: Unknown
- Colongitude: 100° at sunrise
- Eponym: Stanislao Cannizzaro

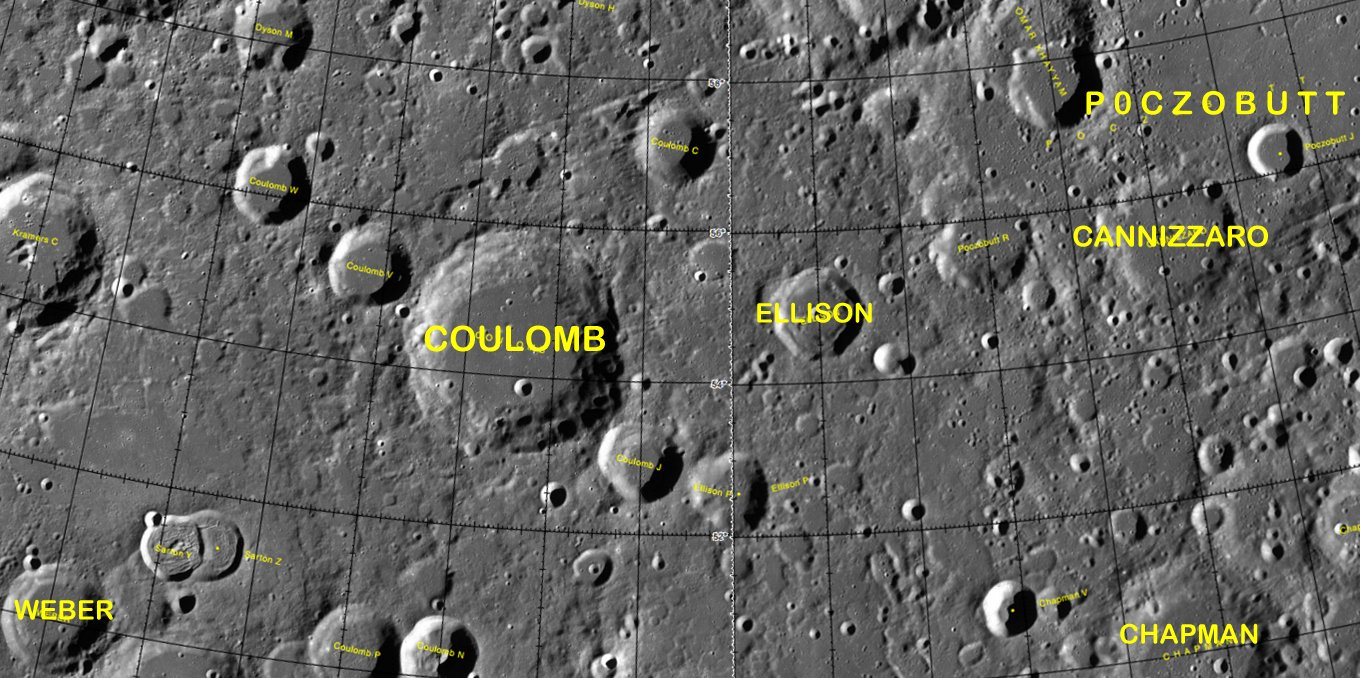
Surroundings including Cannizzaro (upper right)

Cannizzaro is a lunar impact crater that is located on the Moon's far side as seen from the Earth, just beyond the northwestern limb. It lies in a region of the surface that is sometimes brought into view due to the effects of libration, but not much detail can be seen since this feature is viewed from the side.

The crater lies across the southwestern rim of the much larger feature named Poczobutt, a walled plain. It is a worn crater with a rim that has been eroded by impacts. Several of these impacts form deep incisions in the side of the rim, forming indentations several kilometers across. The most prominent of these impacts is a relatively fresh small crater lying across the northeastern rim. The interior floor is nearly level, with a small central ridge offset just to the east of the midpoint.

This crater was named after Italian chemist Stanislao Cannizzaro (1826–1910). Its designation was formally adopted into lunar nomenclature by the International Astronomical Union in 1970.
