= Stanislao Cannizzaro =

Italian chemist (1826–1910)

Stanislao Cannizzaro FRS
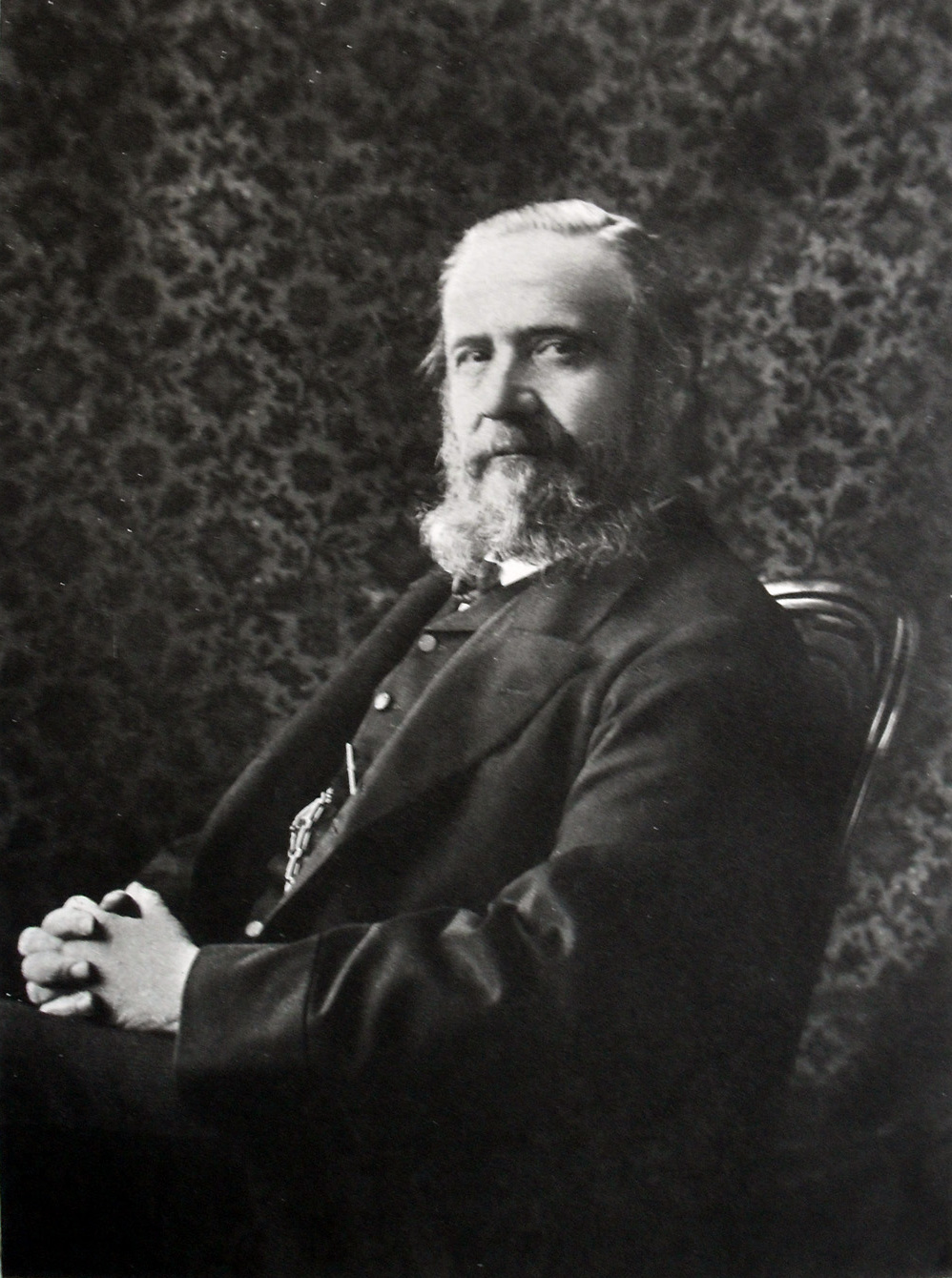
- Born: 13 July 1826; Palermo, Kingdom of Two Sicilies
- Died: 10 May 1910 (aged 83); Rome, Kingdom of Italy
- Known for: Cannizzaro reaction, Standardization of atomic weights
- Awards: Faraday Lectureship Prize (1872); Copley Medal (1891)
- Scientific career
- Fields: Chemistry

President of the Accademia nazionale delle scienze
- In office 12 May 1903 – 10 April 1910
- Preceded by: Luigi Cremona
- Succeeded by: Ulisse Dini

Signature
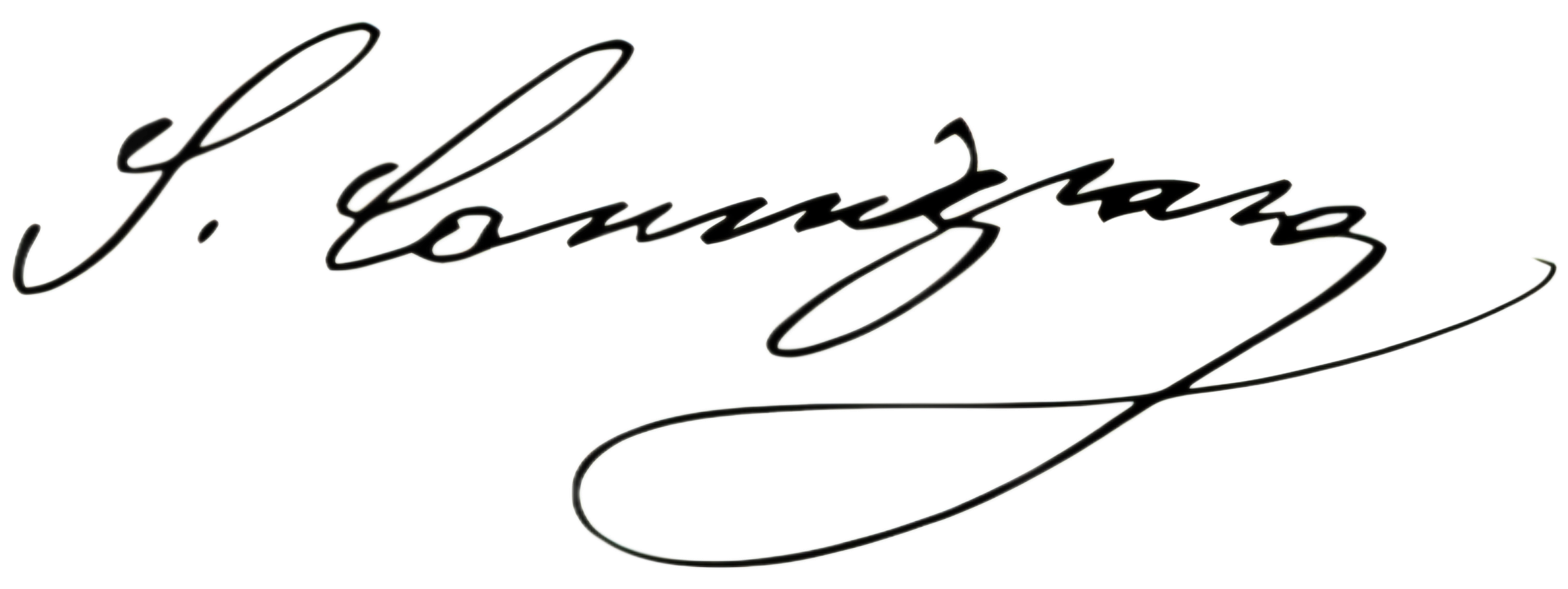

Stanislao Cannizzaro (/ˌkænɪˈzɑːroʊ/ KAN-iz-AR-oh, US also /-ɪtˈsɑːr-/ -it-SAR-; Italian: [staniˈzlaːo kannitˈtsaːro]; 13 July 1826 – 10 May 1910) was an Italian chemist widely regarded as one of the founders of modern chemistry. He is best known for establishing the fundamental distinction between atoms and molecules and a consistent system of atomic weights—first outlined in his 1858 Sunto di un corso di filosofia chimica and championed at the 1860 Karlsruhe Congress—which resolved decades of confusion in chemical notation and laid the essential groundwork for Dmitri Mendeleev's periodic table. He is also famous for the Cannizzaro reaction.

== Biography ==
Cannizzaro was born in Palermo in 1826. He entered the university there with the intention of making medicine his profession, but he soon turned to the study of chemistry. In 1845 and 1846, he acted as assistant to Raffaele Piria (1815–1865), known for his work on salicin, and who was then professor of chemistry at Pisa and subsequently occupied the same position at Turin.

During the Sicilian revolution of independence of 1848, Cannizzaro served as an artillery officer at Messina and was also chosen deputy for Francavilla in the Sicilian parliament; and, after the fall of Messina in September 1848, he was stationed at Taormina. On the collapse of the insurgents, Cannizzaro escaped to Marseille in May 1849, and, after visiting various French towns, reached Paris in October. There he gained an introduction to Michel Eugène Chevreul's laboratory, and in conjunction with F.S. Cloez (1817–1883) made his first contribution to chemical research, in 1851, when they prepared cyanamide by the action of ammonia on cyanogen chloride in ethereal solution. In the same year, Cannizzaro accepted an appointment at the National College of Alessandria, Piedmont as professor of physical chemistry. In Alessandria, he discovered that aromatic aldehydes are decomposed by an alcoholic solution of potassium hydroxide into a mixture of the corresponding acid and alcohol. For example, benzaldehyde decomposes into benzoic acid and benzyl alcohol, the Cannizzaro reaction.

In the autumn of 1855, Cannizzaro became professor of chemistry at the University of Genoa, and, after declining professorships at Pisa and Naples, he accepted the chair of inorganic and organic chemistry at Palermo. There, he spent ten years studying aromatic compounds and continuing to work on amines, until in 1871 when he was appointed to the chair of chemistry at the University of Rome.

Apart from his work on organic chemistry, which includes also an investigation of santonin, Cannizzaro rendered great service to chemistry with his 1858 paper Sunto di un corso di Filosofia chimica, or Sketch of a course of chemical philosophy, in which he insisted on the distinction, previously hypothesized by Amedeo Avogadro, between atomic and molecular weights. Cannizzaro showed how the atomic weights of elements contained in volatile compounds can be deduced from the molecular weights of those compounds, and how the atomic weights of elements of whose compounds the vapour densities are unknown can be determined from a knowledge of their specific heats. The distribution of his Sunto at the 1860 Karlsruhe Congress proved decisive in convincing the international scientific community of Avogadro's hypothesis, directly providing Dmitri Mendeleev and Lothar Meyer with the standardized atomic weights needed to formulate the periodic table of elements. For these achievements, of fundamental importance to atomic theory, he was awarded the Copley Medal by the Royal Society (then the highest scientific honor in the world, predating the Nobel Prize) in 1891.

In 1871, Cannizzaro's scientific eminence secured him admission to the Italian senate, of which he was vice-president, and as a member of the Council of Public Instruction and in other ways he rendered important services to the cause of scientific education in Italy.

He is best known for his contribution to the then-existing debate over atoms, molecules, and atomic weights. He championed Avogadro's law that equal volumes of gas at the same pressure and temperature held equal numbers of molecules, and the notion that equal volumes of gas could be used to calculate atomic weights. In doing so, Cannizzaro provided a new understanding of chemistry, unifying organic and inorganic chemistry under a single system of chemical formulas and enabling the modern classification of the elements. He was awarded honorary membership of the Manchester Literary and Philosophical Society in 1888 in the light of this work.

Cannizzaro crater on the Moon was named after him in 1970.

== Works ==
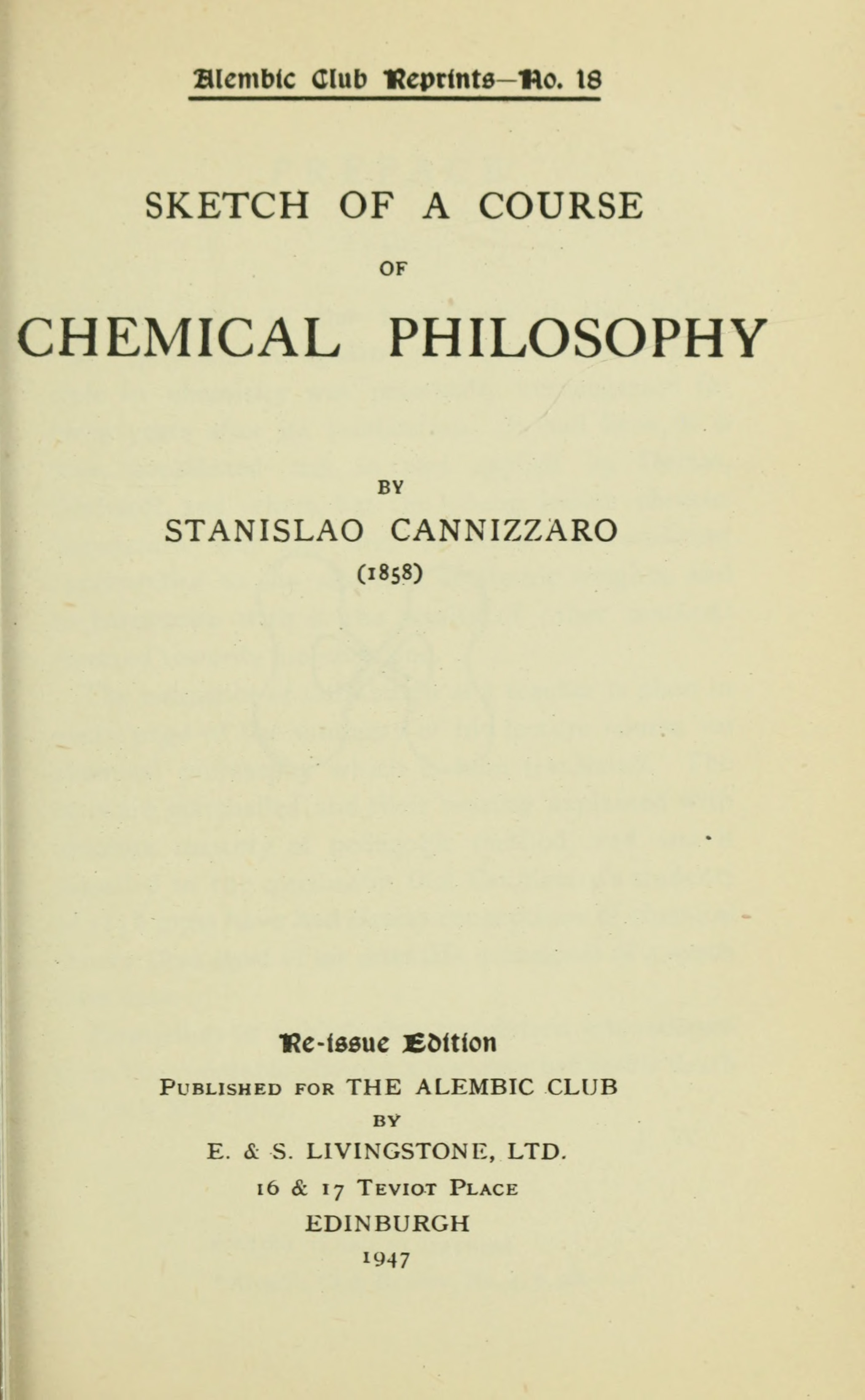
Sketch of a course of chemical philosophy (English translation of Sunto di un corso di filosofia chimica), 1947

- Sunto di un corso di filosofia chimica. Genoa. 1858.
  - Sketch of a course of chemical philosophy. Edinburgh: Livingstone. 1947.
- Scritti intorno alla teoria molecolare ed atomica ed alla notazione chimica. Palermo: Lo Statuto. 1896.
- Scritti vari e lettere inedite nel centenario della nascita. Rome: Leonardo da Vinci. 1926.
- Antonio Di Meo, ed. (1994). La teoria atomica e molecolare. Rome: Edizioni Teknos.

== See also ==
- Cannizzaro reaction
