= Torsional strain =

Torsional strain may refer to:

- Deformation (mechanics)
- Strain (chemistry)#Torsional strain
