= Methylcyclohexane =

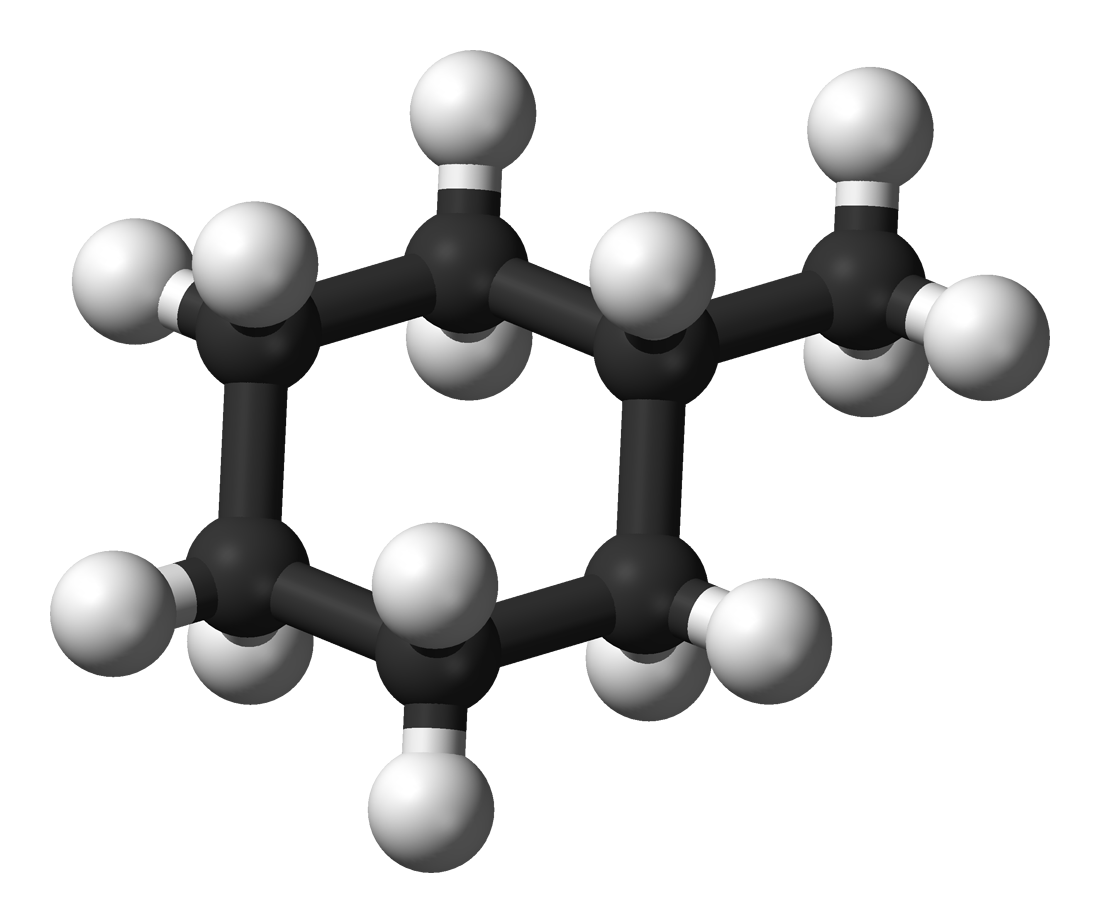

Names
- Preferred IUPAC name Methylcyclohexane
- Other names Hexahydrotoluene; Cyclohexylmethane; Toluene hexahydride

Identifiers
CAS Number	108-87-2
3D model (JSmol)	Interactive image
Abbreviations	CyMe; MeCy
ChEBI	CHEBI:165745
ChemSpider	7674
ECHA InfoCard	100.003.296
PubChem CID	7962
UNII	H5WXT3SV31
CompTox Dashboard (EPA)	DTXSID0047749
- InChI: InChI=1S/C7H14/c1-7-5-3-2-4-6-7/h7H,2-6H2,1H3 Key: UAEPNZWRGJTJPN-UHFFFAOYSA-N; InChI=1/C7H14/c1-7-5-3-2-4-6-7/h7H,2-6H2,1H3 Key: UAEPNZWRGJTJPN-UHFFFAOYAG
- SMILES: CC1CCCCC1

Properties
Chemical formula	C_{7}H_{14}
Molar mass	98.189 g·mol^{−1}
Appearance	Colourless liquid
Odor	faint, benzene-like
Density	0.77 g/cm^{3}
Melting point	−126.3 °C (−195.3 °F; 146.8 K)
Boiling point	101 °C (214 °F; 374 K)
Solubility in water	0.014 g/L at 25 °C
Vapor pressure	37 mmHg (20°C) 49.3 hPa at 20.0 °C; 110.9 hPa at 37.7 °C
Magnetic susceptibility (χ)	−78.91·10^{−6} cm^{3}/mol

Hazards
- Occupational safety and health (OHS/OSH)
Main hazards	severe fire hazard
- GHS labelling
Pictograms	(GHS02: Flammable) (GHS07: Exclamation mark) (GHS09: Environmental hazard)
Signal word	Danger
Hazard statements	H225, H302, H304, H315, H336, H410
Precautionary statements	P210, P235, P301+P310, P331, P370+P378, P403
NFPA 704 (fire diamond)	1 3 0
Flash point	−4 °C (25 °F; 269 K) Closed cup
Autoignition temperature	283 °C (541 °F; 556 K)
Explosive limits	1.2%-6.7%
- Lethal dose or concentration (LD, LC)
LD_{50} (median dose)	2250 mg/kg (mouse, oral)
LC_{50} (median concentration)	10172 ppm (mouse, 2 hr); 10,000-12,500 ppm (mouse, 2 hr); 15227 ppm (rabbit, 1 hr)
- NIOSH (US health exposure limits)
PEL (Permissible)	TWA 500 ppm (2000 mg/m^{3})
REL (Recommended)	TWA 400 ppm (1600 mg/m^{3})
IDLH (Immediate danger)	1200 ppm
- Safety data sheet (SDS)
- Except where otherwise noted, data are given for materials in their standard state (at 25 °C [77 °F], 100 kPa). verify (what is ?) Infobox references

Methylcyclohexane (cyclohexylmethane) is an organic compound with the molecular formula is CH_{3}C_{6}H_{11}. Classified as saturated hydrocarbon, it is a colourless liquid with a faint odor.

Methylcyclohexane is used as a solvent. It is mainly converted in naphtha reformers to toluene. A special use is in PF-1 priming fluid in cruise missiles to aid engine start-up when they run on special nonvolatile jet fuel like JP-10. Methylcyclohexane is also used in some correction fluids (such as White-Out) as a solvent.

== History ==
While researching hydrogenation of arenes with hydroiodic acid in 1876 as part of his doctoral dissertation, Felix Wreden first prepared the hydrocarbon from toluene. He determined its boiling point to be 97°C, its density at 20°C to by 0.76 g/cc and named it hexahydrotoluene. It was soon identified in oil from Baku and obtained by other synthetic methods.

== Production and use ==
Most methylcyclohexane is extracted from petroleum but it can be also produced by catalytic hydrogenation of toluene:

CH_{3}C_{6}H_{5} + 3 H_{2} → CH_{3}C_{6}H_{11}

The hydrocarbon is a minor component of automobile fuel, with its share in US gasoline varying between 0.3 and 1.7% in early 1990s and 0.1 to 1% in 2011. Its research and motor octane numbers are 75 and 71 respectively.

As a component of a mixture, it is usually dehydrogenated to toluene, which increases the octane rating of gasoline.

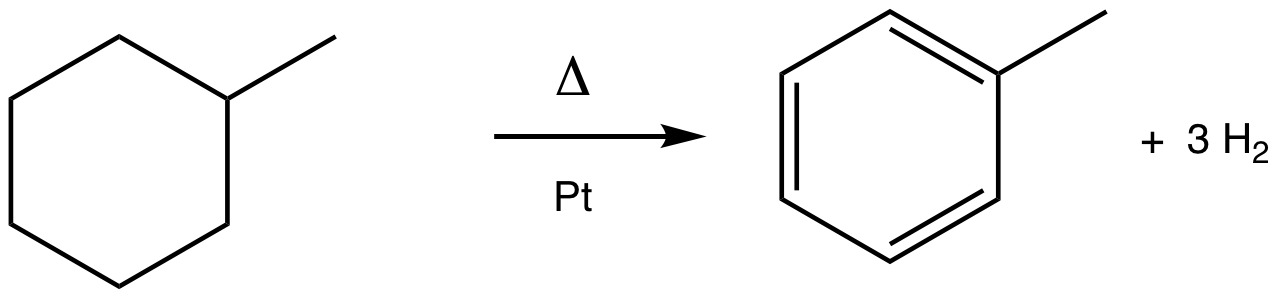
The conversion of methylcyclohexane to toluene is a classic aromatization reaction. This platinum (Pt)-catalyzed process is practiced on scale in the production of gasoline from petroleum.

It is also one of a host of substances in jet fuel surrogate blends, e.g., for Jet A fuel.

=== Solvent ===
Methylcyclohexane is used as an organic solvent, with properties similar to related saturated hydrocarbons such as heptane. It is also a solvent in many types of correction fluids.

== Structure ==
Methylcyclohexane is a monosubstituted cyclohexane because it has one branching via the attachment of one methyl group on one carbon of the cyclohexane ring. Like all cyclohexanes, it can interconvert rapidly between two chair conformers. The lowest energy form of this monosubstituted methylcyclohexane occurs when the methyl group occupies an equatorial rather than an axial position. This equilibrium is embodied in the concept of A value. In the axial position, the methyl group experiences steric crowding (steric strain) because of the presence of axial hydrogen atoms on the same side of the ring (known as the 1,3-diaxial interactions). There are two such interactions, with each pairwise methyl/hydrogen combination contributing approximately 7.61 kJ/mol of strain energy. The equatorial conformation experiences no such interaction, and so it is the energetically favored conformation.

== Flammability and toxicity ==
Methylcyclohexane is flammable.

Furthermore, it is considered "very toxic to aquatic life". Note, while methylcyclohexane is a substructure of 4-methylcyclohexanemethanol (MCHM), it is distinct in its physical, chemical, and biological (ecologic, metabolic, and toxicologic) properties.
