= Sterimol parameter =

Parameters for molecular sterics

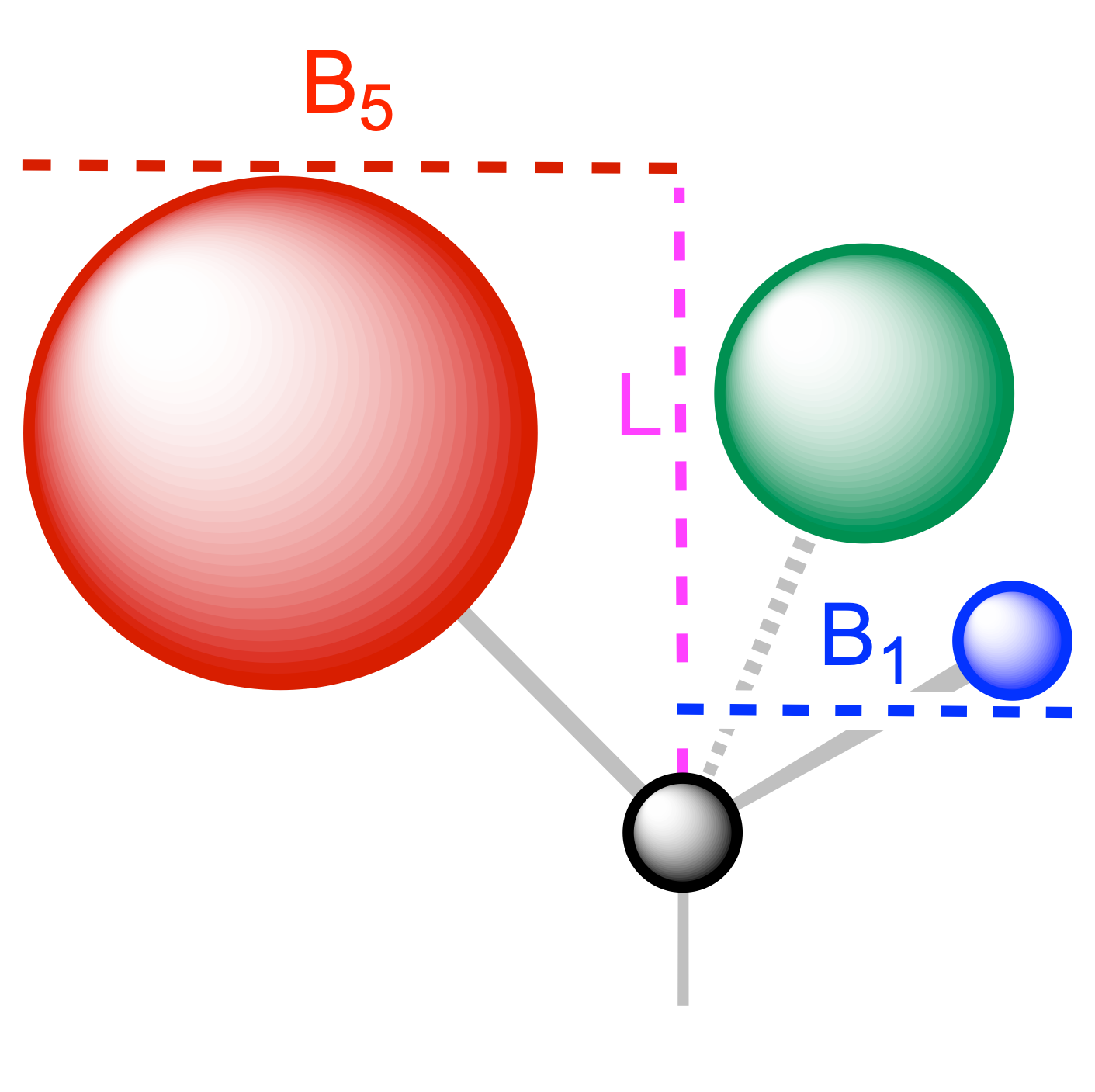
Sterimol Parameters

A sterimol parameter is a set of vectors which describes the steric occupancy of a molecule. First developed by Verloop in the 1970s. Sterimol parameters found extensive application in quantitative structure-activity relationship (QSAR) studies for drug discovery. Introduction of Sterimol parameters into organic synthesis was pioneered by the Sigman research group in the 2010s. Benefiting from the multi-dimensional values that they carry, sterimol parameters give more accurate predictions for the enantioselectivity of asymmetric catalytic reactions than its counterparts, especially in cases when structurally complicated ligands are used.

== Definition ==
Sterimol parameters are built upon the Corey-Pauling-Koltun atomic models, which take into consideration the Van der Waals radii of each atom in the molecule. Unlike most other steric parameters such as A-value, Taft parameters and Tolman cone angle, which group all the spatial information into a single cumulative value, Sterimol parameters consist of three sub-parameters: one length parameter (L), and two width parameters (B_{1}, B_{5}). The three parameters add together to profile the 3-dimensional spatial information of a molecule.

In order to define the Sterimol parameters of a molecule, an axis needs to be defined at first. Since Sterimol parameters are usually applied for describing the bulkiness of a certain substituent which is attached to the substrate, the default choice of the axis is the one that passes through the atoms which link the substrate and substituent together. This axis is defined as the X-axis.

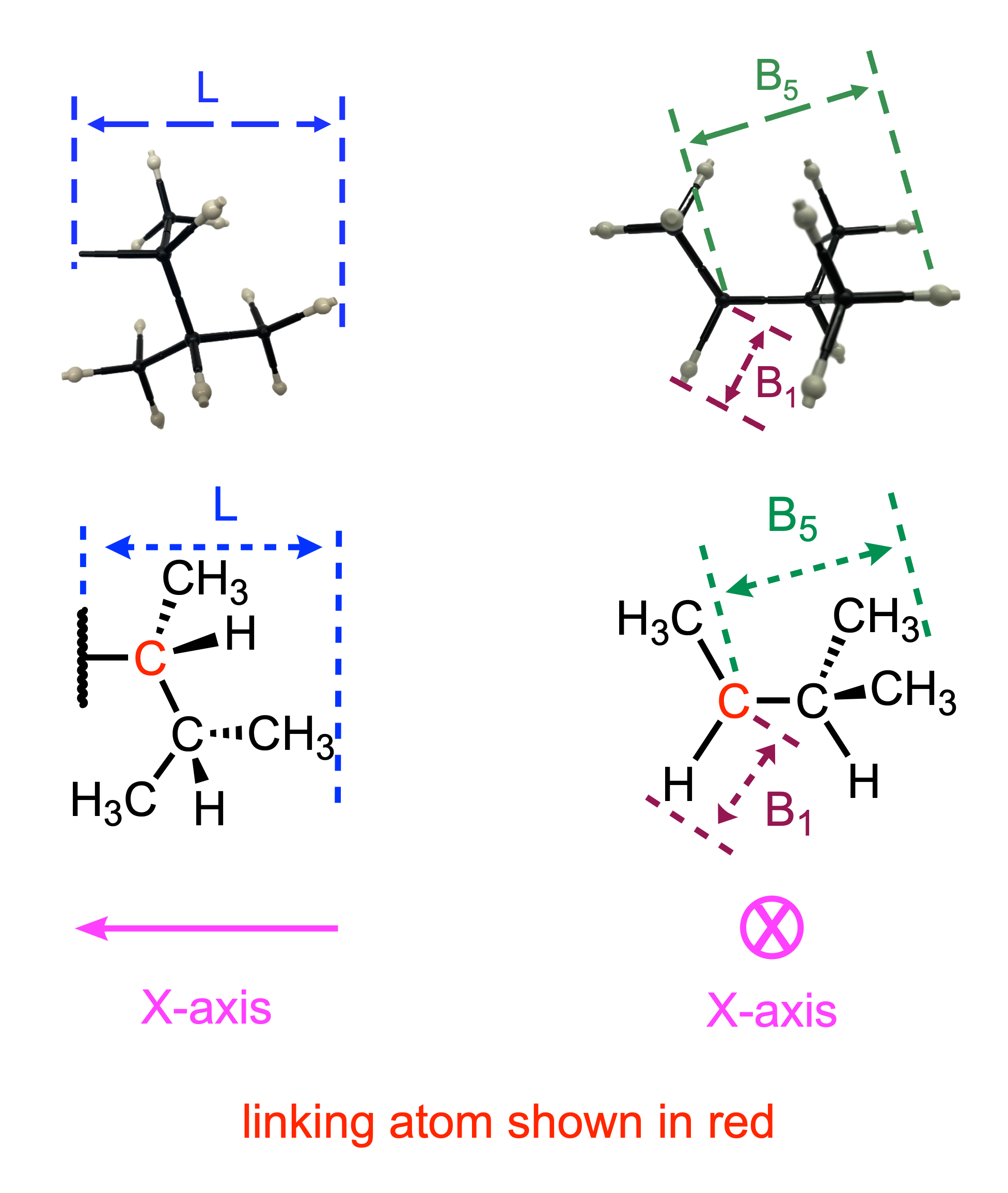
Figure 1: Horizontal and vertical projections of 1,2-dimethylpropyl group

Once the X-axis has been defined, the Sterimol parameters can be assigned. Take the 1,2-dimethylpropyl group as an example (Figure 1). The length parameter (L) refers to the farthest extension of the substituents in the direction parallel to the X axis (shown in Figure 1, left). The width parameters can be assigned from the point of view which is perpendicular to the X axis. The width parameter B_{1} refers to the minimal profile width of the substituents on the linking atom from the X axis, while parameter B_{5} refers to the maximal width from the same axis (shown in Figure 1, right).

Sterimol B_{2}–B_{4} parameters were initially used for obtaining the maximal width. However, in his second generation Sterimol approach, Verloop pointed out that due to their directional dependence on Sterimol B_{1}, discrepancies arose when computing those three parameters in cases where B_{1} can point to multiple directions. Since Sterimol B_{2} and B_{3} hardly contributed significantly to any regression functions obtained, and Sterimol B_{4} was practically equal to B_{5}, the parameters B_{2}–B_{4} were omitted.

Sterimol B_{1} parameter demonstrates the steric effects imposed by branching at the linking atom of a substituent. The more branches the linking atom bears, the larger Sterimol B_{1} value the substituent has. On the other hand, Sterimol B_{5} parameter is more susceptible to the steric effects of the substituent's terminus. In general, Sterimol B_{1} represents vicinal steric effects of the substituent, while Sterimol B_{5} represents remote steric effects.

Several open-source programs have already included the feature of calculating Sterimol parameters, such as Morfeus, Kallisto, and dbstep.

== Application in asymmetric catalysis ==
In the 2010s, machine learning emerged as a powerful tool for guiding catalyst discovery. More specifically, machine learning models such as multivariate linear regression have been applied to study the linear free energy relationships (LFERs) in catalytic asymmetric organic reactions. These relationships describe the effects that ligand substituents have on reaction outcomes, namely enantioselectivity, and can be extrapolated to predict the performance of ligands outside the known dataset. However, machine learning approaches require well-defined molecular descriptors for the steric and electronic properties of ligands in order to make accurate predictions. Sterimol parameters emerged as a good candidate for quantifying the steric environment induced by ligands.

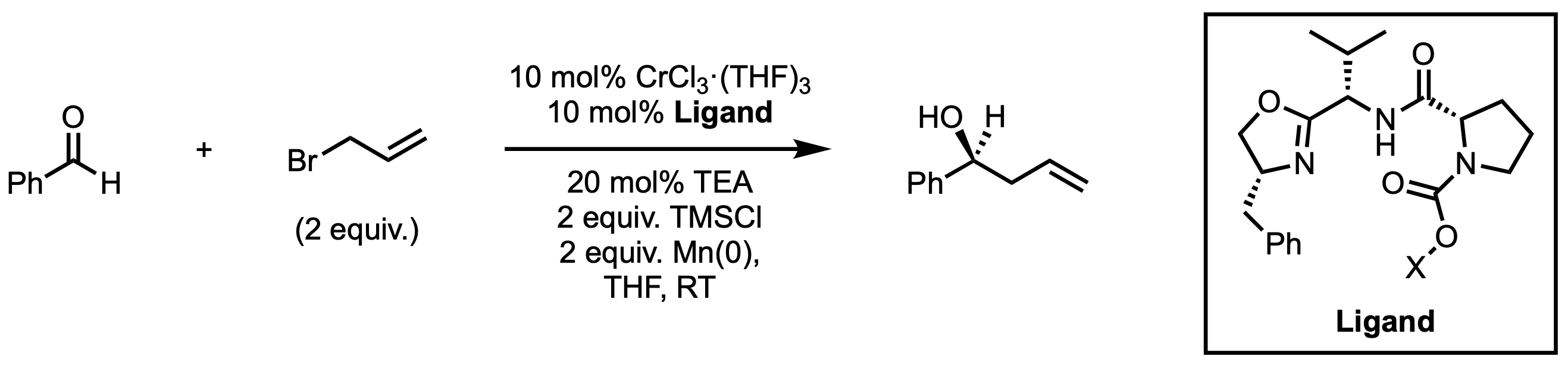
Figure 2: Asymmetric Nozaki-Hiyama-Kishi reaction

In Matthew Sigman's seminal work published in 2012, Sterimol parameters were implemented in asymmetric catalysis for the first time in the analysis of an asymmetric Nozaki-Hiyama-Kishi reaction (Figure 2). In initial ligand screening the team found that the steric hindrance of the ester substituent on the oxazoline-proline-based ligand scaffold was pertinent to the overall enantioselectivity of the reaction. When attempting to use the Charton modification of the Taft's parameters for probing the LFERs, they observed breaks in linearity with respect to several "isopropyl-like" substituents with large Charton values (Figure 3, left). However, this break did not exist when the Sterimol B_{1} parameter was used instead. All of the substituents studied demonstrated good linear correlation between their Sterimol B_{1} value and the reaction enantioselectivity (Figure 3, right).

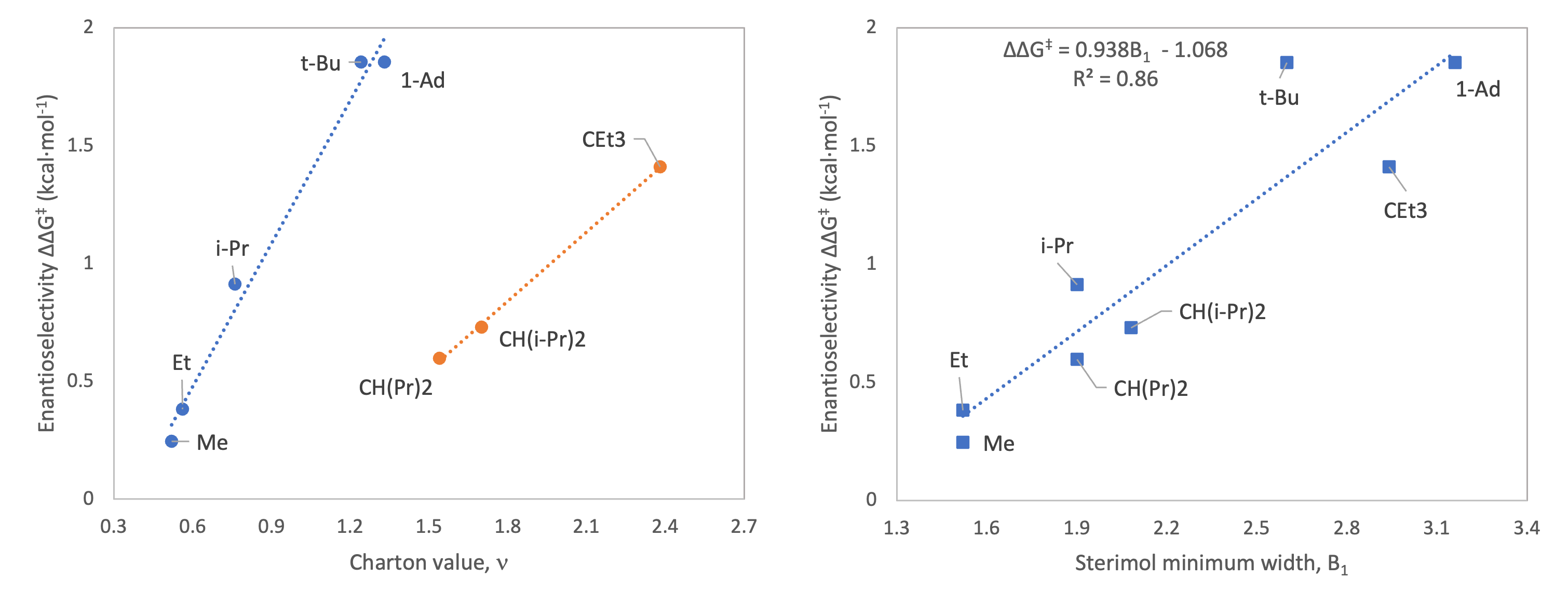
Figure 3: Correlations of Charton values and Sterimol B1 parameters to enantioselectivity

Sigman attributed the superiority of Sterimol B_{1} in this prediction over Charton values to the inherent limitations of the experimentally based Charton values. He noted that the Charton model assumes that the substituent can rapidly rotate around the X-axis. However, in the context of asymmetric catalysis, only one conformation of the substituent provides the transition state with lowest energy, which leads to the formation of the major enantiomer. Therefore, Charton values tend to overestimate the steric effects of substituents that are non-symmetrical around the X-axis, because they can only describe the net conformer of a certain substituent. Sterimol parameters, in contrast, are not derived from experimental results, which are sometimes idiosyncratic as a result of distinct mechanisms. By virtue of their origin, namely quantum chemical calculations, Sterimol parameters can more accurately interpret the steric effects of a substituent in its static form. Sterimol B_{1}, in particular, can approximate the steric repulsive effect of the exact conformer with the lowest energy. Table 1 demonstrates the differences of the two parameters. For example, while they have the same Sterimol B_{1} values, the Charton value of the isopropyl-like CHPr_{2} substituent is significantly larger than that of i-Pr due to overestimation. This explains why better correlation was obtained with Sterimol B_{1}.

Table 1: Comparison between Charton values and Sterimol B_{1} parameters
Charton parameters		B_{1} Sterimol parameters	
Group	Value	Group	Value
H	0	H	1
Me	0.52	Me	1.52
Et	0.56	Et	1.52
Ph	0.57	Bn	1.52
Bn	0.7	CH_{2}i-Pr	1.52
i-Pr	0.76	CH_{2}t-Bu	1.52
Cy	0.87	Ph	1.71
CH_{2}i-Pr	0.98	i-Pr	1.9
t-Bu	1.24	CHPr_{2}	1.9
Ad	1.33	Cy	1.91
CH_{2}t-Bu	1.34	CH(i-Pr)_{2}	2.08
CHEt_{2}	1.51	CHEt_{2}	2.13
CHPr_{2}	1.54	t-Bu	2.6
CH(i-Pr)_{2}	1.7	CEt_{3}	2.94
CEt_{3}	2.38	Ad	3.16

To date, the Sigman lab has applied Sterimol parameters in the analysis of several catalytic asymmetric reactions. Sterimol parameters are also utilized by chemists worldwide to improve the enantioselectivity for various catalytic reactions, such as conjugative addition, Tsuji-Trost reaction, C–H activation, cyclopropanation, etc.

== Weighted sterimol parameters ==
Following Sigman's work, the Paton lab developed a revised form of Sterimol parameters in 2019. Termed "weighted Sterimol" (wSterimol), this new depiction of Sterimol parameters considers the influence of conformational effects. Paton stated that enantioselectivity is a macroscopic observable, and multiple conformations should not be overlooked when generating descriptor values, especially for substituents with greater conformational flexibility. With this in mind, Paton designed the python-based program "wSterimol", which combines conformation search with Sterimol parameter calculation. In a fully automated fashion, the program performs conformer generation, geometry optimization, filtering and Sterimol computation. Finally, the program outputs weighted Sterimol values wB_{1}, wB_{5} and wL, which are generalized based on Boltzmann distribution. This user-friendly program has been applied in the studies of several asymmetric catalytic systems
