= Prelog strain =

Interactions between atomic groups on different parts of a ring molecule

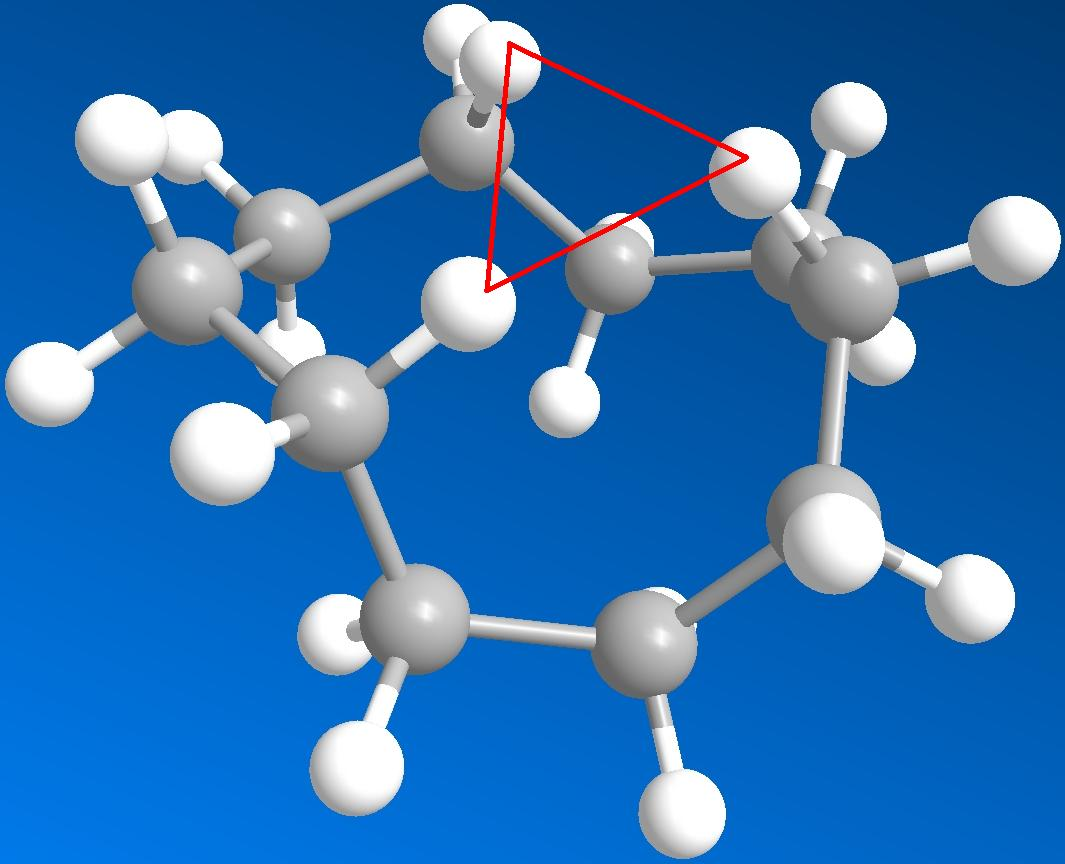
Cyclodecane in its lowest energy conformation. The red triangle indicates three hydrogens responsible for transannular strain. There is an identical interaction on the back of the molecule, as well.

In organic chemistry, transannular strain (also called Prelog strain after chemist Vladimir Prelog) is the unfavorable interactions of ring substituents on non-adjacent carbons. These interactions, called transannular interactions, arise from a lack of space in the interior of the ring, which forces substituents into conflict with one another. In medium-sized cycloalkanes, which have between 8 and 11 carbons constituting the ring, transannular strain can be a major source of the overall strain, especially in some conformations, to which there is also contribution from large-angle strain and Pitzer strain. In larger rings, transannular strain drops off until the ring is sufficiently large that it can adopt conformations devoid of any negative interactions.

Transannular strain can also be demonstrated in other cyclo-organic molecules, such as lactones, lactams, ethers, cycloalkenes, and cycloalkynes. These compounds are not without significance, since they are particularly useful in the study of transannular strain. Furthermore, transannular interactions are not relegated to only conflicts between hydrogen atoms, but can also arise from larger, more complicated substituents interacting across a ring.

== Thermodynamics ==
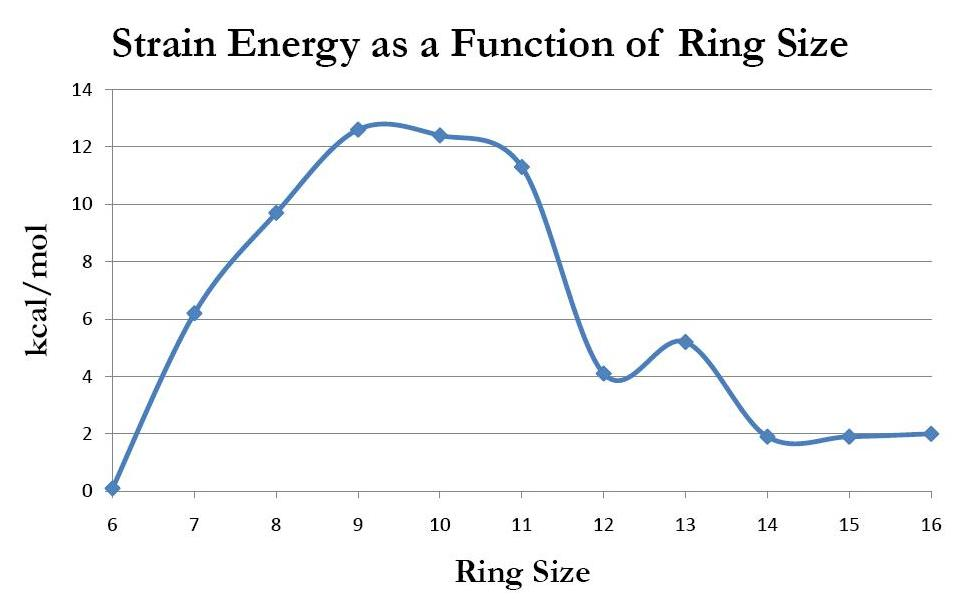
Strain increases significantly among medium-sized cycloalkanes.

By definition, strain implies discomfiture, so it should follow that molecules with large amounts of transannular strain should have higher energies than those without. Cyclohexane, for the most part, is without strain and is therefore quite stable and low in energy. Rings smaller than cyclohexane, like cyclopropane and cyclobutane, have significant tension caused by small-angle strain, but there is no transannular strain. While there is no small-angle strain present in medium-sized rings, there does exist something called large-angle strain. Some angle and torsional strain is used by rings with more than nine members to relieve some of the distress caused by transannular strain.

As the plot to the left indicates, the relative energies of cycloalkanes increases as the size of the ring increases, with a peak at cyclononane (with nine members in its ring.) At this point, the flexibility of the rings increases with increasing size; this allows for conformations that can significantly mitigate transannular interactions.

== Kinetics ==
Types of reaction	Rings						
Types of reaction	Small		Normal		Intermediate		Large
Types of reaction	3-	4-	5-	6-	7-	8- to 12-	≥13-
S_{N}1, S_{N}2, and free radical	very slow	slow	fast	slow	fast	fast	medium rate
addition to carbonyl group	very fast	fast	slow	fast	slow	slow	medium rate

Rates of reaction can be affected by the size of rings. Essentially each reaction should be studied on a case-by-case basis but some general trends have been seen. Molecular mechanics calculations of strain energy differences ΔSI between a sp^{2} and sp^{3} state in cycloalkanes show linear correlations with rates (as $\log k$) of many reactions involving the transition between sp^{2} and sp^{3} states, such as ketone reduction, alcohol oxidation or nucleophilic substitution, the contribution of transannular strain is below 3%.

Rings with transannular strain have faster S_{N}1, S_{N}2, and free radical reactions compared to most smaller and normal sized rings. Five membered rings show an exception to this trend. On the other hand, some nucleophilic addition reactions involving addition to a carbonyl group in general show the opposite trend. Smaller and normal rings, with five membered rings being the anomaly, have faster reaction rates while those with transannular strain are slower.

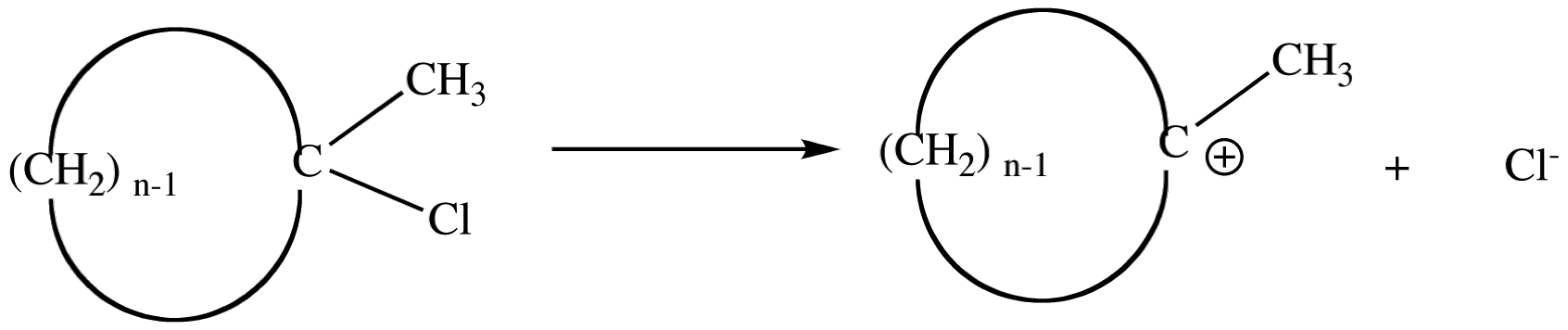
This S_{N}1 reaction was studied for n = 4–17. The data is shown in the table.

n	k_{1} (h^{−1}) at 25 °C	Relative rate
4	0.00224	0.211
5	1.32	124
6	0.0106	1.00
7	1.15	108
8	3.03	286
9	0.465	43.9
10	0.188	17.7
11	0.127	12.0
13	0.0302	2.85
15	0.0192	1.81
17	0.0201	1.90

One specific example of a study of rates of reactions for an S_{N}1 reaction is shown on the right. Various sized rings, ranging from four to seventeen members, were used to compare the relative rates and better understand the effect of transannular strain on this reaction. The solvolysis reaction in acetic acid involved the formation of a carbocation as the chloride ion leaves the cyclic molecule. This study fits the general trend seen above that rings with transannular strain show increased reactions rates compared to smaller rings in S_{N}1 reactions.

== Examples of transannular strain ==
=== Influence on regioselectivity ===
The regioselectivity of water elimination is highly influenced by ring size. When water is eliminated from cyclic tertiary alcohols by an E1 route, three major products are formed. The semicyclic isomer (so-called because the double bond is shared by a ring atom and an exocyclic atom) and the (E) endocyclic isomer are expected to predominate; the (Z) endocyclic isomer is not expected to be formed until the ring size is large enough to accommodate the awkward angles of the trans configuration. The exact population of each product relative to the others differs considerably depending upon the size of the ring involved. As the ring size increases, the semicyclic isomer decreases rapidly and the (E) endocyclic isomer increases, but after a certain point, the semicyclic isomer begins to increase again. This can be attributed to transannular strain; this strain is significantly reduced in the (E) endocyclic isomer because it has one less substituent in the ring than the semicyclic isomer.

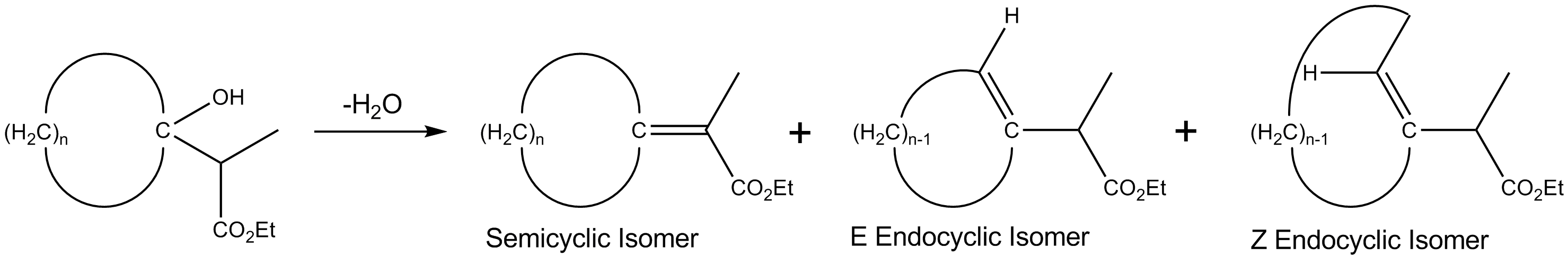
Products yielded from the elimination of water from cyclic tertiary alcohols.

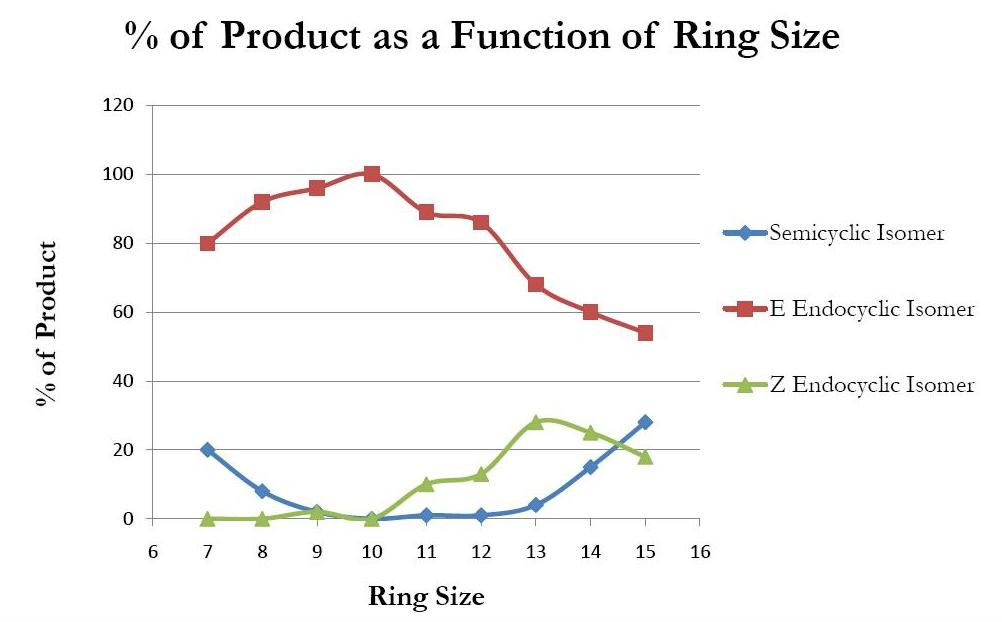
In the medium-size ring region, the percent of product is closely correlated with transannular strain.

=== Influence on medium-sized ring synthesis ===
One of the effects of transannular strain is the difficulty of synthesizing medium-sized rings. Illuminati et al. have studied the kinetics of intramolecular ring closing using the simple nucleophilic substitution reaction of ortho-bromoalkoxyphenoxides. Specifically, they studied the ring closing of 5 to 10 carbon cyclic ethers. They found that as the number of carbons increased, so did the enthalpy of activation for the reaction. This indicates that strain within the cyclic transition states is higher if there are more carbons in the ring. Since transannular strain is the largest source of strain in rings this size, the larger enthalpies of activation result in much slower cyclizations due to transannular interactions in the cyclic ethers.

=== Influence of bridges on transannular strain ===
Transannular strain can be eliminated by the simple addition of a carbon bridge. E,Z,E,Z,Z-[10]-annulene is quite unstable; while it has the requisite number of π-electrons to be aromatic, they are for the most part isolated. Ultimately, the molecule itself is very difficult to observe. However, by the simple addition of a methylene bridge between the 1 and 6 positions, a stable, flat, aromatic molecule can be made and observed.

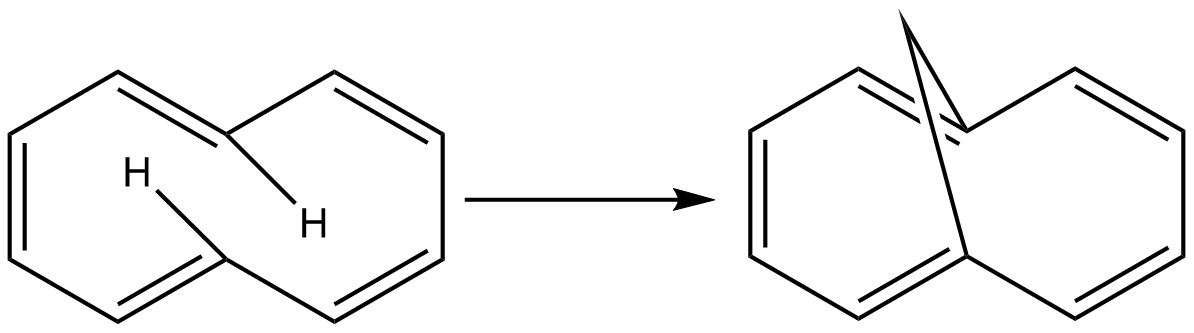
Addition of a methylene bridge significantly reduces transannular strain.
