= Strain (chemistry) =

When a molecule is deformed from its lowest-energy conformation by applied stress

In chemistry, a molecule experiences strain when its chemical structure undergoes some stress which raises its internal energy in comparison to a strain-free reference compound. The internal energy of a molecule consists of all the energy stored within it. A strained molecule has an additional amount of internal energy which an unstrained molecule does not. This extra internal energy, or strain energy, can be likened to a compressed spring. Much like a compressed spring must be held in place to prevent release of its potential energy, a molecule can be held in an energetically unfavorable conformation by the bonds within that molecule. Without the bonds holding the conformation in place, the strain energy would be released.

== Summary ==
=== Thermodynamics ===
The equilibrium of two molecular conformations is determined by the difference in Gibbs free energy of the two conformations. From this energy difference, the equilibrium constant for the two conformations can be determined.

$$K_{\rm eq}= \exp \left (-\frac{\Delta {G^\circ}}{RT} \right) \,$$

If there is a decrease in Gibbs free energy from one state to another, this transformation is spontaneous and the lower energy state is more stable. A highly strained, higher energy molecular conformation will spontaneously convert to the lower energy molecular conformation.

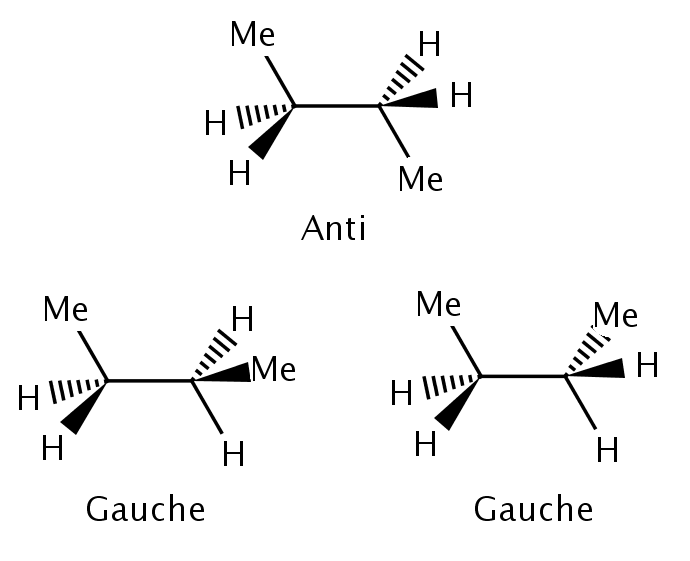
Examples of the anti and gauche conformations of butane.

Enthalpy and entropy are related to Gibbs free energy through the equation (at a constant temperature):

$$\Delta{G^\circ}=\Delta{H^\circ}-T\Delta{S^\circ}\,.$$

Enthalpy is typically the more important thermodynamic function for determining a more stable molecular conformation. While there are different types of strain, the strain energy associated with all of them is due to the weakening of bonds within the molecule. Since enthalpy is usually more important, entropy can often be ignored. This isn't always the case; if the difference in enthalpy is small, entropy can have a larger effect on the equilibrium. For example, n-butane has two possible conformations, anti and gauche. The anti conformation is more stable by 0.9 kcal mol^{−1}. We would expect that butane is roughly 82% anti and 18% gauche at room temperature. However, there are two possible gauche conformations and only one anti conformation. Therefore, entropy makes a contribution of 0.4 kcal in favor of the gauche conformation. We find that the actual conformational distribution of butane is 70% anti and 30% gauche at room temperature.

=== Determining molecular strain ===
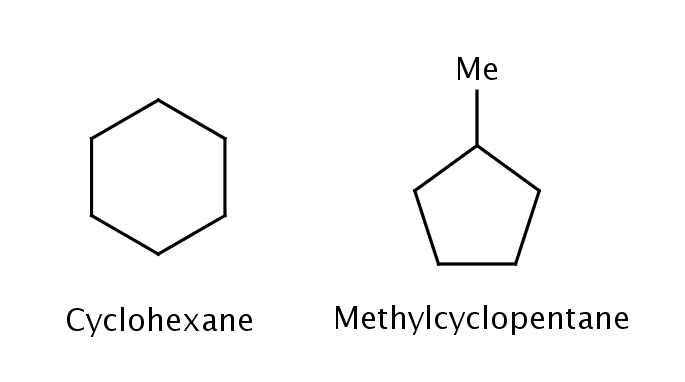
Images of cyclohexane and methylcyclopentane.

The standard heat of formation (Δ_{f}H°) of a compound is described as the enthalpy change when the compound is formed from its separated elements. When the heat of formation for a compound is different from either a prediction or a reference compound, this difference can often be attributed to strain. For example, Δ_{f}H° for cyclohexane is -29.9 kcal mol^{−1} while Δ_{f}H° for methylcyclopentane is -25.5 kcal mol^{−1}. Despite having the same atoms and number of bonds, methylcyclopentane is higher in energy than cyclohexane. This difference in energy can be attributed to the ring strain of a five-membered ring which is absent in cyclohexane. Experimentally, strain energy is often determined using heats of combustion which is typically an easy experiment to perform.

Determining the strain energy within a molecule requires knowledge of the expected internal energy without the strain. There are two ways do this. First, one could compare to a similar compound that lacks strain, such as in the previous methylcyclohexane example. Unfortunately, it can often be difficult to obtain a suitable compound. An alternative is to use Benson group increment theory. As long as suitable group increments are available for the atoms within a compound, a prediction of Δ_{f}H° can be made. If the experimental Δ_{f}H° differs from the predicted Δ_{f}H°, this difference in energy can be attributed to strain energy.

== Kinds of strain ==
=== Van der Waals strain ===
Van der Waals strain, or steric strain, occurs when atoms are forced to get closer than their Van der Waals radii allow. Specifically, Van der Waals strain is considered a form of strain where the interacting atoms are at least four bonds away from each other. The amount on steric strain in similar molecules is dependent on the size of the interacting groups; bulky tert-butyl groups take up much more space than methyl groups and often experience greater steric interactions.

The effects of steric strain in the reaction of trialkylamines and trimethylboron were studied by Nobel laureate Herbert C. Brown et al. They found that as the size of the alkyl groups on the amine were increased, the equilibrium constant decreased as well. The shift in equilibrium was attributed to steric strain between the alkyl groups of the amine and the methyl groups on boron.

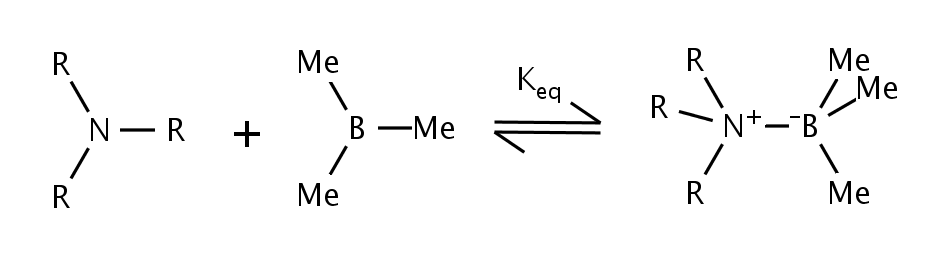
Reaction of trialkylamines and trimethylboron.

==== Syn-pentane strain ====

There are situations where seemingly identical conformations are not equal in strain energy. Syn-pentane strain is an example of this situation. There are two different ways to put both of the bonds the central in n-pentane into a gauche conformation, one of which is 3 kcal mol^{−1} higher in energy than the other. When the two methyl-substituted bonds are rotated from anti to gauche in opposite directions, the molecule assumes a cyclopentane-like conformation where the two terminal methyl groups are brought into proximity. If the bonds are rotated in the same direction, this doesn't occur. The steric strain between the two terminal methyl groups accounts for the difference in energy between the two similar, yet very different conformations.

==== Allylic strain ====
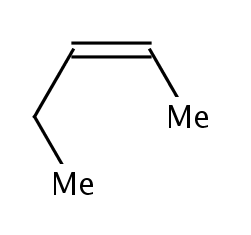
Allylic methyl and ethyl groups are close together.

Allylic strain, or A^{1,3} strain is closely associated to syn-pentane strain. An example of allylic strain can be seen in the compound 2-pentene. It's possible for the ethyl substituent of the olefin to rotate such that the terminal methyl group is brought near to the vicinal methyl group of the olefin. These types of compounds usually take a more linear conformation to avoid the steric strain between the substituents.

==== 1,3-diaxial strain ====
1,3-diaxial strain is another form of strain similar to syn-pentane. In this case, the strain occurs due to steric interactions between a substituent of a cyclohexane ring ('α') and gauche interactions between the alpha substituent and both methylene carbons two bonds away from the substituent in question (hence, 1,3-diaxial interactions). When the substituent is axial, it is brought near to an axial gamma hydrogen. The amount of strain is largely dependent on the size of the substituent and can be relieved by forming into the major chair conformation placing the substituent in an equatorial position. The difference in energy between conformations is called the A value and is well known for many different substituents. The A value is a thermodynamic parameter and was originally measured along with other methods using the Gibbs free energy equation and, for example, the Meerwein–Ponndorf–Verley reduction/Oppenauer oxidation equilibrium for the measurement of axial versus equatorial values of cyclohexanone/cyclohexanol (0.7 kcal mol^{−1}).

=== Torsional strain ===
Torsional strain is the resistance to bond twisting. In cyclic molecules, it is also called Pitzer strain.

Torsional strain occurs when atoms separated by three bonds are placed in an eclipsed conformation instead of the more stable staggered conformation. The barrier of rotation between staggered conformations of ethane is approximately 2.9 kcal mol^{−1}. It was initially believed that the barrier to rotation was due to steric interactions between vicinal hydrogens, but the Van der Waals radius of hydrogen is too small for this to be the case. Recent research has shown that the staggered conformation may be more stable due to a hyperconjugative effect. Rotation away from the staggered conformation interrupts this stabilizing force.

More complex molecules, such as butane, have more than one possible staggered conformation. The anti conformation of butane is approximately 0.9 kcal mol^{−1} (3.8 kJ mol^{−1}) more stable than the gauche conformation. Both of these staggered conformations are much more stable than the eclipsed conformations. Instead of a hyperconjugative effect, such as that in ethane, the strain energy in butane is due to both steric interactions between methyl groups and angle strain caused by these interactions.

=== Ring strain ===
According to the VSEPR theory of molecular bonding, the preferred geometry of a molecule is that in which both bonding and non-bonding electrons are as far apart as possible. In molecules, it is quite common for these angles to be somewhat compressed or expanded compared to their optimal value. This strain is referred to as angle strain, or Baeyer strain. The simplest examples of angle strain are small cycloalkanes such as cyclopropane and cyclobutane, which are discussed below. Furthermore, there is often eclipsing or Pitzer strain in cyclic systems. These and possible transannular interactions were summarized early by H.C. Brown as internal strain, or I-Strain. Molecular mechanics or force field approaches allow to calculate such strain contributions, which then can be correlated e.g. with reaction rates or equilibria. Many reactions of alicyclic compounds, including equilibria, redox and solvolysis reactions, which all are characterized by transition between sp2 and sp3 state at the reaction center, correlate with corresponding strain energy differences ΔSI (sp2 -sp3). The data reflect mainly the unfavourable vicinal angles in medium rings, as illustrated by the severe increase of ketone reduction rates with increasing ΔSI (Figure 1). Another example is the solvolysis of bridgehead tosylates with steric energy differences between corresponding bromide derivatives (sp3) and the carbenium ion as sp2- model for the transition state. (Figure 2)

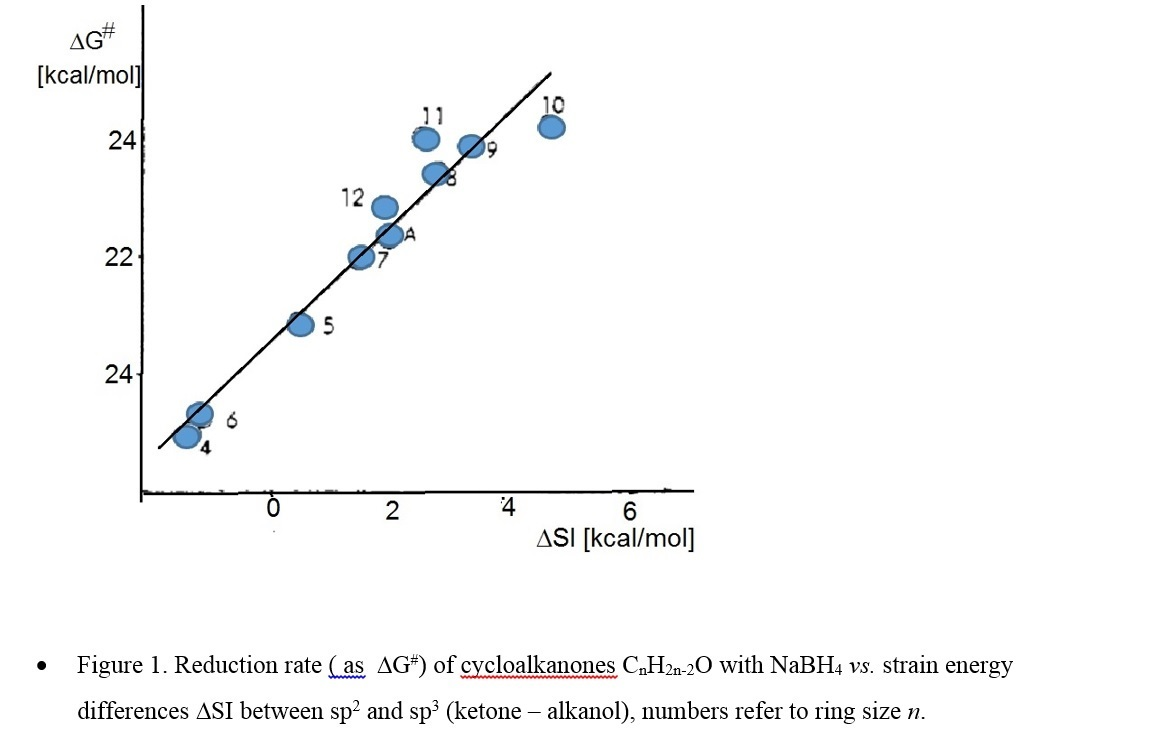
Figure 1 B

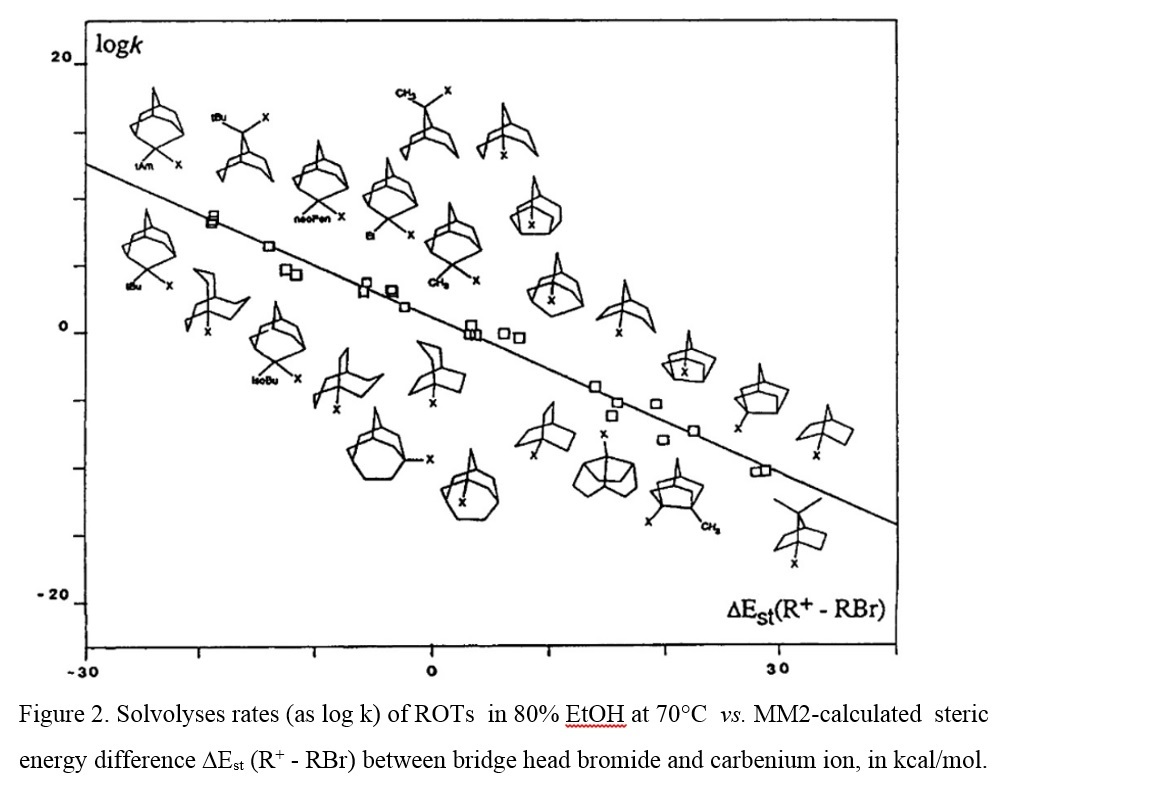
Figure 2 B

Strain of some common cycloalkane ring-sizes
Ring size	Strain energy (kcal mol^{−1})	Ring size	Strain energy (kcal mol^{−1})
3	27.5	10	12.4
4	26.3	11	11.3
5	6.2	12	4.1
6	0.1	13	5.2
7	6.2	14	1.9
8	9.7	15	1.9
9	12.6	16	2.0

In principle, angle strain can occur in acyclic compounds, but the phenomenon is rare.

==== Small rings ====
Cyclohexane is considered a benchmark in determining ring strain in cycloalkanes and it is commonly accepted that there is little to no strain energy. In comparison, smaller cycloalkanes are much higher in energy due to increased strain. Cyclopropane is analogous to a triangle and thus has bond angles of 60°, much lower than the preferred 109.5° of an sp^{3} hybridized carbon. Furthermore, the hydrogens in cyclopropane are eclipsed. Cyclobutane experiences similar strain, with bond angles of approximately 88° (it isn't completely planar) and eclipsed hydrogens. The strain energy of cyclopropane and cyclobutane are 27.5 and 26.3 kcal mol^{−1}, respectively. Cyclopentane experiences much less strain, mainly due to torsional strain from eclipsed hydrogens: its preferred conformations interconvert by a process called pseudorotation.

Ring strain can be considerably higher in bicyclic systems. For example, bicyclobutane, C_{4}H_{6}, is noted for being one of the most strained compounds that is isolatable on a large scale; its strain energy is estimated at 63.9 kcal mol^{−1} (267 kJ mol^{−1}).

==== Transannular strain ====
Medium-sized rings (7–13 carbons) experience more strain energy than cyclohexane, due mostly to deviation from ideal vicinal angles, or Pitzer strain. Molecular mechanics calculations indicate that transannular strain, also known as Prelog strain, does not play an essential role. Transannular reactions however, such as 1,5-shifts in cyclooctane substitution reactions, are well known.

==== Bicyclic systems ====
The amount of strain energy in bicyclic systems is commonly the sum of the strain energy in each individual ring. This isn't always the case, as sometimes the fusion of rings induces some extra strain.

==== Strain in allosteric systems ====
In synthetic allosteric systems there are typically two or more conformers with stability differences due to strain contributions. Positive cooperativity for example results from increased binding of a substrate A to a conformer C2 which is produced by binding of an effector molecule E. If the conformer C2 has a similar stability as another equilibrating conformer C1 a fit induced by the substrate A will lead to binding of A to C2 also in absence of the effector E. Only if the stability of the conformer C2 is significantly smaller, meaning that in absence of an effector E the population of C2 is much smaller than that of C1, the ratio K2/K1 which measures the efficiency of the allosteric signal will increase. The ratio K2/K1 can be related directly to the strain energy difference between the conformers C1 and C2; if it is small higher concentrations of A will directly bind to C2 and make the effector E inefficient. In addition, the response time of such allosteric switches depends on the strain of the conformer interconversion transitions state.

== See also ==
- Strain (materials science)
