= Ring strain =

Instability in molecules with bonds at unnatural angles

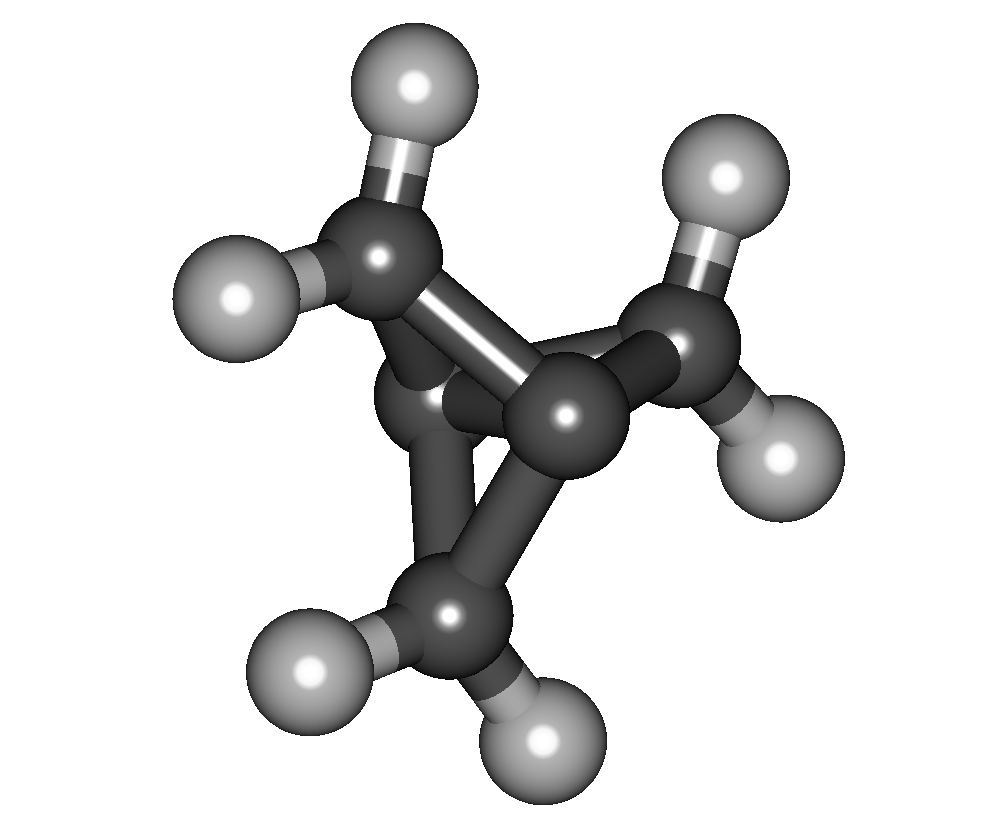
1.1.1-Propellane (C_{2}(CH_{2})_{3}) is one of the most strained molecules known.

In organic chemistry, ring strain is a type of instability that exists when bonds in a molecule form angles that deviate from their normal values as a result of being part of a ring. This type of strain is most commonly discussed for small rings such as cyclopropanes and cyclobutanes, whose internal angles are substantially smaller than the idealized value of approximately 109°. Because of their high strain, the heat of combustion for these small rings is elevated.

Ring strain results from a combination of angle strain, conformational strain or Pitzer strain (torsional eclipsing interactions), and transannular strain, also known as van der Waals strain or Prelog strain. The simplest examples of angle strain are small cycloalkanes such as cyclopropane and cyclobutane.

Ring strain energy can be attributed to the energy required for the distortion of bond and bond angles in order to close a ring.

The avoidance or reduction of ring strain can help direct or accelerate chemical reactions.

== History ==
Adolf von Baeyer received a Nobel Prize in 1905 for the discovery of the Baeyer strain theory, which was an explanation of the relative stabilities of cyclic molecules Baeyer's work assumed that the rings in cyclic compounds were flat. Around the same time, Hermann Sachse|de postulated that rings were not flat but existed in other folded or twisted conformations. Ernst Mohr later combined the two theories to explain the stability of six-membered rings and their frequency in nature.

== Some concepts ==
- Maximum bond strength results from effective overlap of atomic orbitals in a chemical bond.
- Angle strain occurs when bond angles deviate from the ideal bond angles to achieve maximum bond strength in a specific chemical conformation. Angle strain typically is observed in cyclic molecules, which lack the flexibility of acyclic molecules
- Strained rings exhibit enhanced reactivity.

=== Energetics ===
Angle strain destabilizes a molecule, as manifested in elevated heat of combustion. A quantitative measure for angle strain is strain energy. Angle strain and torsional strain combine to create ring strain that affects cyclic molecules.

$$\ce{C}_{n}\ce{H}_{2n} + \tfrac{3n}{2}\ce{O2} \longrightarrow n\ce{CO2} + n\ce{H2O} - \Delta H_\text{combustion}$$

Normalized energies that allow comparison of ring strains are obtained by measuring per methylene group (CH_{2}) of the molar heat of combustion in the cycloalkanes.

ΔH_{combustion} per CH_{2} − 658.6 kJ = strain per CH_{2}

The value 658.6 kJ per mole is obtained from an unstrained long-chain alkane.

Strain of some common cycloalkane ring-sizes
Ring size	Strain energy (kcal/mol)	Ring size	Strain energy (kcal/mol)
3	27.5	10	12.4
4	26.3	11	11.3
5	6.2	12	4.1
6	0.1	13	5.2
7	6.2	14	1.9
8	9.7	15	1.9
9	12.6	16	2.0

== Cycloalkanes ==
In alkanes, optimum overlap of atomic orbitals is achieved when bond angles are near 109.5°, the angle for tetrahedral geometry. The most common cyclic compounds have five or six carbons in their ring.

In simple cycloalkanes, each carbon is bonded nonpolar covalently to two carbons and two hydrogen. The carbons have sp^{3} hybridization and should have ideal bond angles of 109.5°. Due to the limitations of cyclic structure, however, the ideal angle is only achieved in a six carbon ring—cyclohexane in chair conformation. For other cycloalkanes, the bond angles deviate from ideal.

=== Monocycles ===
- cyclopropane (29 kcal/mol), C_{3}H_{6} – the C-C-C bond angles are 60° whereas tetrahedral 109.5° bond angles are expected. The intense angle strain leads to nonlinear orbital overlap of its sp^{3} orbitals. Because of the bond's instability, cyclopropane is more reactive than other alkanes. Since any three points make a plane and cyclopropane has only three carbons, cyclopropane is planar. The H-C-H bond angle is 115° whereas 106° is expected as in the CH_{2} groups of propane.
- cyclobutane (26.3 kcal/mol), C_{4}H_{8} – if cyclobutane were completely square planar, its bond angles would be 90° whereas tetrahedral 109.5° bond angles are expected. However, the actual C-C-C bond angle is 88° because it has a slightly folded form to relieve some torsional strain at the expense of slightly more angle strain. The high strain energy of cyclobutane is primarily from angle strain.
- cyclopentane (7.4 kcal/mol), C_{5}H_{10} – if it was a completely regular planar pentagon its bond angles would be 108°, but tetrahedral 109.5° bond angles are expected. However, it has an unfixed puckered shape that undulates up and down.
- cyclohexane (1.3 kcal/mol), C_{6}H_{12} – Although the chair conformation is able to achieve ideal angles, the unstable half-chair conformation has angle strain in the C-C-C angles which range from 109.86° to 119.07°.

=== Bicyclics ===
Bicyclic hydrocarbons can exhibit particularly high ring strain.

- bicyclo[1.1.0]butane (66.3 kcal/mol), C_{4}H_{6}
- bicyclo[1.2.0]pentane (54.7 kcal/mol), C_{5}H_{8}
- bicyclo[1.3.0]hexane (26 kcal/mol), C_{6}H_{10}
- norbornane (16.6 kcal/mol), C_{7}H_{12}

Ring strain can be considerably higher in bicyclic systems. For example, bicyclobutane, C_{4}H_{6}, is noted for being one of the most strained compounds that is isolatable on a large scale; its strain energy is estimated at 63.9 kcal mol^{−1} (267 kJ mol^{−1}). The propellanes are extreme examples of strained rings that isolable.

== Cyclic alkenes ==
=== Monocyclic alkenes ===
Cycloalkenes generally have more ring strain than cycloalkanes, which is seen when comparing cyclopropane and cyclopropene. Cyclic alkenes are subject to strain resulting from distortion of the sp^{2}-hybridized carbon centers. Small trans-cycloalkenes are particularly strained. The smallest trans-cycloalkane that has been isolated is trans-cyclooctene. trans-Cycloheptene has been detected, but its lifetime at room temperature is only a few second. trans-Cyclohexene is proposed as an intermediate in some reactions. Small cis-cycloalkenes have much less ring strain than their trans isomers.

=== More complex cyclic alkenes ===
Strain is also evident or at least invoked in some polycyclic alkenes. Angle strain is the basis of Bredt's rule, which dictates that bridgehead carbon centers are not incorporated in alkenes because the resulting alkene would be strained. Some aspects of C_{60}'s reactivity are attributed to its pyramidalized carbon centres,

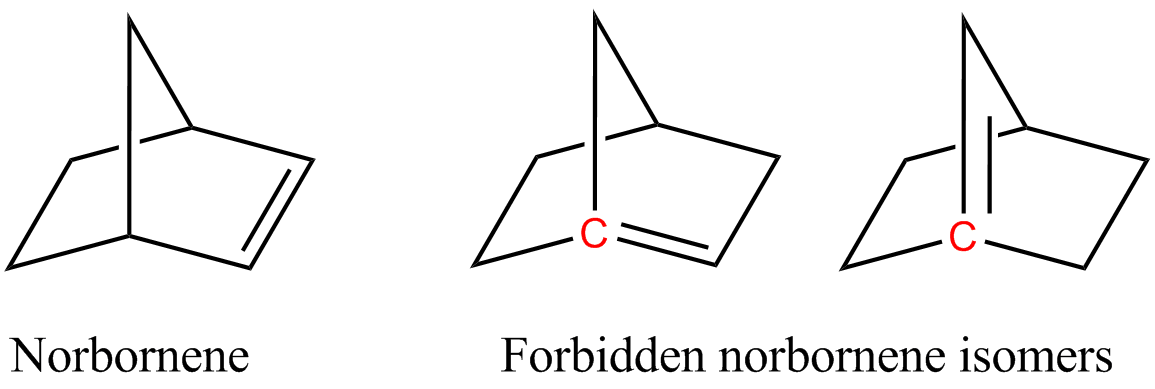
Bredt's rule which indicates that alkenes rarely incorporate bridgehead carbon centers. This rule is a consequence of angle strain.

== Torsional strain (Pitzer strain) ==
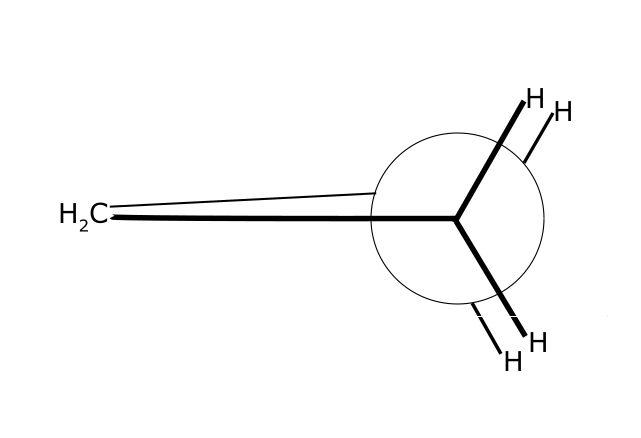
Newman projection of cyclopropane showing eclipsing interactions contributing to torsional strain

In some molecules, torsional strain can contribute to ring strain in addition to angle strain. One example of such a molecule is cyclopropane. Cyclopropane's carbon-carbon bonds form angles of 60°, far from the preferred angle of 109.5° angle in alkanes, so angle strain contributes most to cyclopropane's ring strain. However, as shown in the Newman projection of the molecule, the hydrogen atoms are eclipsed, causing some torsional strain as well.

== Examples ==
Molecules with a high amount of ring strain consist of three, four, and some five-membered rings, including: cyclopropanes, cyclopropenes, cyclobutanes, cyclobutenes, epoxides, aziridines, cyclopentenes, and norbornenes. These molecules have bond angles between ring atoms which are more acute than the optimal tetrahedral (109.5°) and trigonal planar (120°) bond angles required by their respective sp^{3} and sp^{2} bonds. Because of the smaller bond angles, the bonds have higher energy and adopt more p-character to reduce the energy of the bonds. In addition, the ring structures of cyclopropanes/enes and cyclclobutanes/enes offer very little conformational flexibility. Thus, the substituents of ring atoms exist in an eclipsed conformation in cyclopropanes and between gauche and eclipsed in cyclobutanes, contributing to higher ring strain energy in the form of van der Waals repulsion.

Cyclopropane has a lesser amount of ring strain since it has the least amount of unsaturation; as a result, increasing the amount of unsaturation leads to greater ring strain. For example, cyclopropene has a greater amount of ring strain than cyclopropane because it has more unsaturation.

== Research ==
Some types of click chemistry exploit strained rings. The Nobel Prize winning work of Carolyn Bertozzi for example involves biolabeling using specialized cyclooctynes. Ring strain can be used to drive many reactions in organic synthesis such ring opening metathesis polymerisation and photo-induced ring opening of cyclobutenes

Increased potential energy from ring strain also can be used to increase the energy released by explosives or increase their shock sensitivity. For example, the shock sensitivity of the explosive 1,3,3-Trinitroazetidine could partially or primarily explained by its ring strain.

== Applications ==
Possibly the most common practical application of ring strain is the ring-opening of epoxides, e.g. in ethoxylations to produce surfactants.

== See also ==
- Alkane stereochemistry
