= Cyclohexane conformation =

Structures of cyclohexane

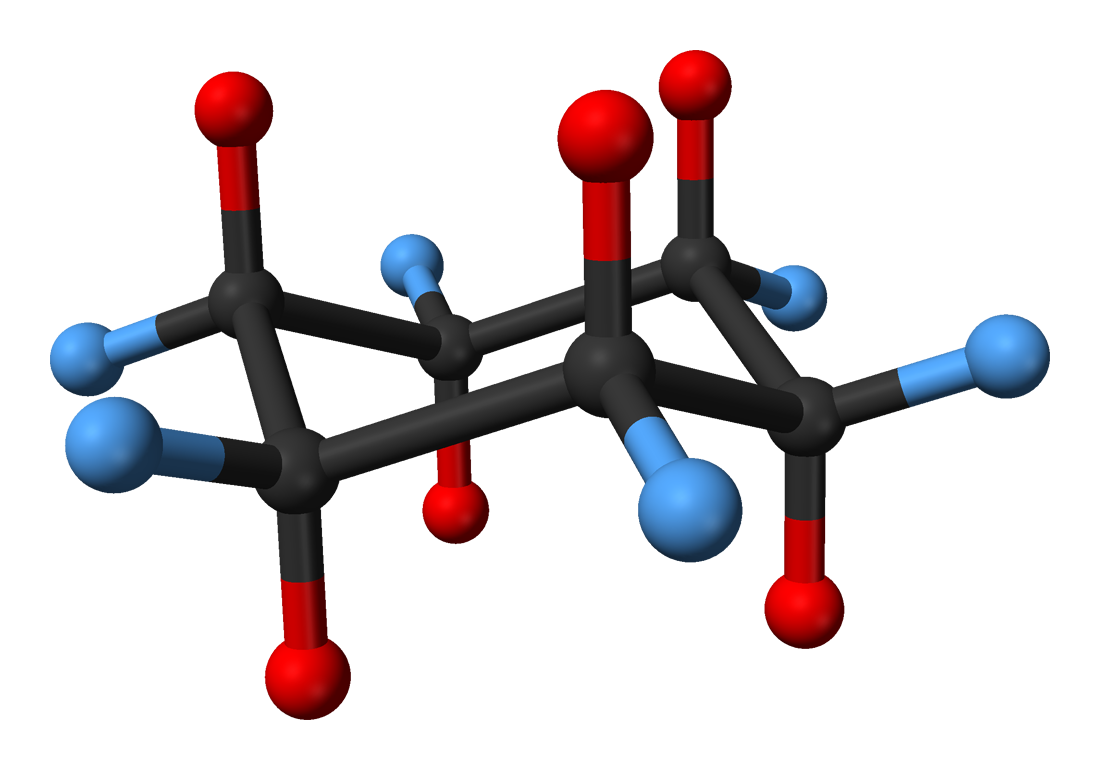
A cyclohexane molecule in chair conformation. Hydrogen atoms in axial positions are shown in red, while those in equatorial positions are in blue.

Cyclohexane conformations are any of several three-dimensional shapes adopted by cyclohexane. Because many compounds feature structurally similar six-membered rings, the structure and dynamics of cyclohexane are important prototypes of a wide range of compounds.

The internal angles of a regular, flat hexagon are 120°, while the preferred angle between successive bonds in a carbon chain is about 109.5°, the tetrahedral angle (the arc cosine of −1/3). Therefore, the cyclohexane ring tends to assume non-planar (warped) conformations, which have all angles closer to 109.5° and therefore a lower strain energy than the flat hexagonal shape.

Consider the carbon atoms numbered from 1 to 6 around the ring. If we hold carbon atoms 1, 2, and 3 stationary, with the correct bond lengths and the tetrahedral angle between the two bonds, and then continue by adding carbon atoms 4, 5, and 6 with the correct bond length and the tetrahedral angle, we can vary the three dihedral angles for the sequences (1,2,3,4), (2,3,4,5), and (3,4,5,6). The next bond, from atom 6, is also oriented by a dihedral angle, so we have four degrees of freedom. But that last bond has to end at the position of atom 1, which imposes three conditions in three-dimensional space. If the bond angle in the chain (6,1,2) should also be the tetrahedral angle then we have four conditions. Normally this would mean that there are no degrees of freedom of conformation, giving a finite number of solutions. With atoms 1, 2, and 3 fixed, there are two solutions, called chair (depending on whether the dihedral angle for (1,2,3,4) is positive or negative), but it turns out that there is also a continuum of solutions, a topological circle where angle strain is zero, including the twist boat and the boat conformations. All the conformations on this continuum have a twofold axis of symmetry running through the ring, whereas the chair conformations do not (they have D_{3d} symmetry, with a threefold axis running through the ring). It is because of the symmetry of the conformations on this continuum that it is possible to satisfy all four constraints with a range of dihedral angles at (1,2,3,4). On this continuum the energy varies because of Pitzer strain related to the dihedral angles. The twist-boat has a lower energy than the boat. In order to go from the chair conformation to a twist-boat conformation or the other chair conformation, bond angles have to be changed, leading to a high-energy half-chair conformation. So the relative energies are: chair < twist-boat < boat < half-chair with chair being the most stable and half-chair the least. All relative conformational energies are shown below. At room temperature the molecule can easily move among these conformations, but only chair and twist-boat can be isolated in pure form, because the others are not at local energy minima.

The boat and twist-boat conformations, as said, lie along a continuum of zero angle strain. If there are substituents that allow the different carbon atoms to be distinguished, then this continuum is like a circle with six boat conformations and six twist-boat conformations between them, three "right-handed" and three "left-handed". (Which should be called right-handed is unimportant.) But if the carbon atoms are indistinguishable, as in cyclohexane itself, then moving along the continuum takes the molecule from the boat form to a "right-handed" twist-boat, and then back to the same boat form (with a permutation of the carbon atoms), then to a "left-handed" twist-boat, and then back again to the achiral boat. The passage from boat → right-twist-boat → boat → left-twist-boat → boat constitutes a full pseudorotation.

== Coplanar carbons ==
Another way to compare the stability within two molecules of cyclohexane in the same conformation is to evaluate the number of coplanar carbons in each molecule. Coplanar carbons are carbons that are all on the same plane. Increasing the number of coplanar carbons increases the number of eclipsing substituents. This increases the overall torsional strain and decreases the stability of the conformation. Cyclohexane diminishes the torsional strain from eclipsing substituents through adopting a conformation with fewer coplanar carbons. For example, if a half-chair conformation contains four coplanar carbons and another half-chair conformation contains five coplanar carbons, the conformation with four coplanar carbons will be more stable.

== Principal conformers ==
The different conformations are called "conformers", a blend of the words "conformation" and "isomer".

=== Chair conformation ===
The chair conformation is the most stable conformer. At 298 K (25 °C), 99.99% of all molecules in a cyclohexane solution adopt this conformation.

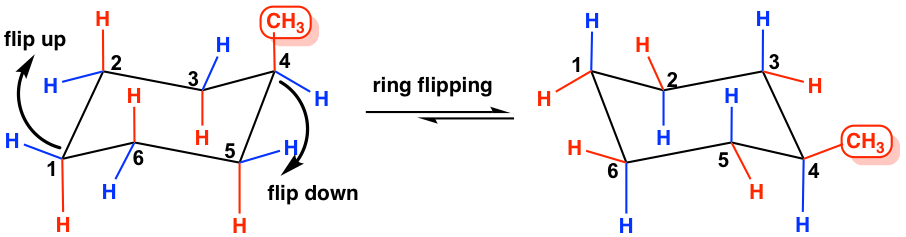
Chair conformation of methylcyclohexane with ring flip

The C–C ring of the chair conformation has the same shape as the 6-membered rings in the diamond cubic lattice. This can be modeled as follows. Consider a carbon atom to be a point with four half-bonds sticking out towards the vertices of a tetrahedron. Place it on a flat surface with one half-bond pointing straight up. Looking from directly above, the other three half-bonds will appear to point outwards towards the vertices of an equilateral triangle, so the bonds will appear to have an angle of 120° between them. Arrange six such atoms above the surface so that these 120° angles form a regular hexagon. Reflecting three of the atoms to be below the surface yields the desired geometry.

All carbon centers are equivalent. They alternate between two parallel planes, one containing C1, C3 and C5, and the other containing C2, C4, and C6. The chair conformation is left unchanged after a rotation of 120° about the symmetry axis perpendicular to these planes, as well as after a rotation of 60° followed by a reflection in the midpoint plane, resulting in a symmetry group of D_{3d}. While all C–C bonds are tilted relative to the plane, diametrically opposite bonds (such as C1–C2 and C4–C5) are parallel to each other.

Six of the twelve C–H bonds are axial, pointing upwards or downwards almost parallel to the symmetry axis. The other six C–H bonds are equatorial, oriented radially outwards with an upwards or downwards tilt. Each carbon center has one axial C–H bond (pointed alternately upwards or downwards) and one equatorial C–H bond (tilted alternately downwards or upwards), enabling each X–C–C–Y unit to adopt a staggered conformation with minimal torsional strain. In this model, the dihedral angles for series of four carbon atoms going around the ring alternate between exactly +60° (gauche^{+}) and −60° (gauche^{−}).

The chair conformation cannot be deformed without changing bond angles or lengths. It can be represented as two linked chains, C1–C2–C3–C4 and C1–C6–C5–C4, each mirroring the other, with opposite dihedral angles. The C1–C4 distance depends on the absolute value of this dihedral angle, so in a rigid model, changing one angle requires changing the other angle. If both dihedral angles change while remaining opposites of each other, it is not possible to maintain the correct C–C–C bond angles at C1 and C4.

The chair geometry is often preserved when the hydrogen atoms are replaced by halogens or other simple groups. However, when these hydrogens are substituted for a larger group, additional strain may occur due to diaxial interactions between pairs of substituents occupying the same-orientation axial position, which are typically repulsive due to steric crowding.

=== Boat and twist-boat conformations ===
The boat conformations have higher energy than the chair conformations. The interaction between the two flagpole hydrogens, in particular, generates steric strain. Torsional strain also exists between the C2–C3 and C5–C6 bonds (carbon number 1 is one of the two on a mirror plane), which are eclipsed — that is, these two bonds are parallel one to the other across a mirror plane. Because of this strain, the boat configuration is unstable (i.e. is not a local energy minimum).

The molecular symmetry is C_{2v}.

The boat conformations spontaneously distorts to twist-boat conformations. Here the symmetry is D_{2}, a purely rotational point group with three twofold axes. This conformation can be derived from the boat conformation by applying a slight twist to the molecule so as to remove eclipsing of two pairs of methylene groups. The twist-boat conformation is chiral, existing in right-handed and left-handed versions. The xyz positions of the carbon atoms for one of the two enantiomers of the twist-boat giving bond lengths of 1 and tetrahedral bond angles are:
$$\begin{array}{c|ccc}
&x&y&z\\
\hline
\text{C}1 & \sqrt{7/12-\sqrt{1/6}}+\sqrt{1/3} & 0 & 0 \\
\text{C}2 & \sqrt{7/12-\sqrt{1/6}} & \sqrt{1-\sqrt{1/6}} & \sqrt{\sqrt{1/6}-1/3} \\
\text{C}3 &-\sqrt{7/12-\sqrt{1/6}} & \sqrt{1-\sqrt{1/6}} &-\sqrt{\sqrt{1/6}-1/3} \\
\text{C}4 &-\sqrt{7/12-\sqrt{1/6}}-\sqrt{1/3} & 0 & 0 \\
\text{C}5 &-\sqrt{7/12-\sqrt{1/6}} &-\sqrt{1-\sqrt{1/6}} & \sqrt{\sqrt{1/6}-1/3} \\
\text{C}6 & \sqrt{7/12-\sqrt{1/6}} &-\sqrt{1-\sqrt{1/6}} &-\sqrt{\sqrt{1/6}-1/3}
\end{array}$$
In this model, the dihedral angles for the chains 1-2-3-4 and 4-5-6-1 are approximately +70.64°, and for the other four −33.16°, and are the opposites for the other enantiomer. This is a slightly twisted version of a boat conformation:
$$\begin{array}{c|ccc}
&x&y&z\\
\hline
\text{C}1 & \sqrt{11/12} & 0 & -\sqrt{2/27} \\
\text{C}2 & \sqrt{25/132} & \sqrt{50/99} & \sqrt{8/27} \\
\text{C}3 &-\sqrt{25/132} & \sqrt{8/11} & -\sqrt{2/27} \\
\text{C}4 &-\sqrt{11/12}  & 0 & -\sqrt{2/27} \\
\text{C}5 &-\sqrt{25/132} &-\sqrt{50/99} & \sqrt{8/27} \\
\text{C}6 & \sqrt{25/132} &-\sqrt{8/11} & -\sqrt{2/27}
\end{array}$$

It is also a twisted version (twisting the opposite way) of the boat obtained by negating the y and z coordinates of the above.

The concentration of the twist-boat conformation at room temperature is less than 0.1%, but at 1,073 K (800 °C) it can reach 30%. Rapid cooling of a sample of cyclohexane from 1,073 K (800 °C) to 40 K (−233 °C) will freeze in a large concentration of twist-boat conformation, which will then slowly convert to the chair conformation upon heating.

=== Half-chair conformation ===
The half-chair conformation of cyclohexane is an intermediate stage in the "ring flip" between two chair conformations. It's a high-energy state due to torsional and angle strain, making it less stable than both the chair and boat conformations.

== Dynamics ==
=== Chair to chair ===
Cyclohexane chair flip (ring inversion) reaction via boat conformation 4. Structures of the significant conformations are shown: chair 1, half-chair 2, twist-boat 3 and boat 4. When ring flip happens completely from chair to chair, hydrogens that were previously axial (blue H in upper-left structure) turn equatorial and equatorial ones (red H in upper-left structure) turn axial. It is not necessary to go through the boat form.

The interconversion of chair conformers is called ring flipping or chair-flipping. Carbon–hydrogen bonds that are axial in one configuration become equatorial in the other, and vice versa. At room temperature the two chair conformations rapidly equilibrate. The proton NMR spectrum of cyclohexane is a singlet at room temperature, with no separation into separate signals for axial and equatorial hydrogens.

In one chair form, the dihedral angle of the chain of carbon atoms (1,2,3,4) is positive whereas that of the chain (1,6,5,4) is negative, but in the other chair form, the situation is the opposite. So both these chains have to undergo a reversal of dihedral angle. When one of these two four-atom chains flattens to a dihedral angle of zero, we have the half-chair conformation, at a maximum energy along the conversion path. When the dihedral angle of this chain then becomes equal (in sign as well as magnitude) to that of the other four-atom chain, the molecule has reached the continuum of conformations, including the twist boat and the boat, where the bond angles and lengths can all be at their normal values and the energy is therefore relatively low. After that, the other four-carbon chain has to switch the sign of its dihedral angle in order to attain the target chair form, so again the molecule has to pass through the half-chair as the dihedral angle of this chain goes through zero. Switching the signs of the two chains sequentially in this way minimizes the maximum energy state along the way (at the half-chair state) — having the dihedral angles of both four-atom chains switch sign simultaneously would mean going through a conformation of even higher energy due to angle strain at carbons 1 and 4.

The detailed mechanism of the chair-to-chair interconversion has been the subject of much study and debate. The half-chair state (D, in figure below) is the key transition state in the interconversion between the chair and twist-boat conformations. The half-chair has C_{2} symmetry. The interconversion between the two chair conformations involves the following sequence: chair → half-chair → twist-boat → half-chair′ → chair′.

=== Twist-boat to twist-boat ===
The boat conformation (C, below) is a transition state, allowing the interconversion between two different twist-boat conformations. While the boat conformation is not necessary for interconversion between the two chair conformations of cyclohexane, it is often included in the reaction coordinate diagram used to describe this interconversion because its energy is considerably lower than that of the half-chair, so any molecule with enough energy to go from twist-boat to chair also has enough energy to go from twist-boat to boat. Thus, there are multiple pathways by which a molecule of cyclohexane in the twist-boat conformation can achieve the chair conformation again.

Conformation name and relative energy: (A) chair; (B) twist-boat, 21 kJ/mol (5 kcal/mol); (C) boat, 25 kJ/mol (6 kcal/mol); and (D) half-chair, 43 kJ/mol (10 kcal/mol).

== Substituted derivatives ==
The conformer of methylcyclohexane with equatorial methyl is favored by 1.74 kcal/mol (7.3 kJ/mol) relative to the conformer where methyl is axial.

In cyclohexane, the two chair conformations have the same energy. The situation becomes more complex with substituted derivatives.

=== Monosubstituted cyclohexanes ===
A monosubstituted cyclohexane is one in which there is one non-hydrogen substituent in the cyclohexane ring. The most energetically favorable conformation for a monosubstituted cyclohexane is the chair conformation with the non-hydrogen substituent in the equatorial position because it prevents high steric strain from 1,3 diaxial interactions. In methylcyclohexane the two chair conformers are not isoenergetic. The methyl group prefers the equatorial orientation. The preference of a substituent towards the equatorial conformation is measured in terms of its A value, which is the Gibbs free energy difference between the two chair conformations. A positive A value indicates preference towards the equatorial position. The magnitude of the A values ranges from nearly zero for very small substituents such as deuterium, to about 5 kcal/mol (21 kJ/mol) for very bulky substituents such as the tert-butyl group. Thus, the magnitude of the A value will also correspond to the preference for the equatorial position. Though an equatorial substituent has no 1,3 diaxial interaction that causes steric strain, it has a Gauche interaction in which an equatorial substituent repels the electron density from a neighboring equatorial substituent.

=== Disubstituted cyclohexanes ===
For 1,2- and 1,4-disubstituted cyclohexanes, a cis configuration leads to one axial and one equatorial group. Such species undergo rapid, degenerate chair flipping. For 1,2- and 1,4-disubstituted cyclohexane, a trans configuration, the diaxial conformation is effectively prevented by its high steric strain. For 1,3-disubstituted cyclohexanes, the cis form is diequatorial and the flipped conformation suffers additional steric interaction between the two axial groups. trans-1,3-Disubstituted cyclohexanes are like cis-1,2- and cis-1,4- and can flip between the two equivalent axial/equatorial forms.

Cis-1,4-Di-tert-butylcyclohexane has an axial tert-butyl group in the chair conformation and conversion to the twist-boat conformation places both groups in more favorable equatorial positions. As a result, the twist-boat conformation is more stable by 0.47 kJ/mol (0.11 kcal/mol) at 125 K (−148 °C) as measured by NMR spectroscopy.

Also, for a disubstituted cyclohexane, as well as more highly substituted molecules, the aforementioned A values are additive for each substituent. For example, if calculating the A value of a dimethylcyclohexane, any methyl group in the axial position contributes 1.70 kcal/mol- this number is specific to methyl groups and is different for each possible substituent. Therefore, the overall A value for the molecule is 1.70 kcal/mol per methyl group in the axial position.

=== 1,3 diaxial interactions and gauche interactions ===
1,3 Diaxial interactions occur when the non-hydrogen substituent on a cyclohexane occupies the axial position. This axial substituent is in the eclipsed position with the axial substituents on the 3-carbons relative to itself (there will be two such carbons and thus two 1,3 diaxial interactions). This eclipsed position increases the steric strain on the cyclohexane conformation and the confirmation will shift towards a more energetically favorable equilibrium.

Gauche interactions occur when a non-hydrogen substituent on a cyclohexane occupies the equatorial position. The equatorial substituent is in a staggered position with the 2-carbons relative to itself (there will be two such carbons and thus two 1,2 gauche interactions). This creates a dihedral angle of ~60°. This staggered position is generally preferred to the eclipsed positioning.

=== Effects of substituent size on stability ===
Once again, the conformation and position of groups (i.e. substituents) larger than a singular hydrogen are critical to the overall stability of the molecule. The larger the group, the less likely to prefer the axial position on its respective carbon. Maintaining said position with a larger size costs more energy from the molecule as a whole because of steric repulsion between the large groups' nonbonded electron pairs and the electrons of the smaller groups (i.e. hydrogens). Such steric repulsions are absent for equatorial groups. The cyclohexane model thus assesses steric size of functional groups on the basis of gauche interactions. The gauche interaction will increase in energy as the size of the substituent involved increases. For example, a t-butyl substituent would sustain a higher energy gauche interaction as compared to a methyl group, and therefore, contribute more to the instability of the molecule as a whole.

In comparison, a staggered conformation is thus preferred; the larger groups would maintain the equatorial position and lower the energy of the entire molecule. This preference for the equatorial position among bulkier groups lowers the energy barriers between different conformations of the ring. When the molecule is activated, there will be a loss in entropy due to the stability of the larger substituents. Therefore, the preference of the equatorial positions by large molecules (such as a methyl group) inhibits the reactivity of the molecule and thus makes the molecule more stable as a whole.

== Effects on conformational equilibrium ==
Conformational equilibrium is the tendency to favor the conformation where cyclohexane is the most stable. This equilibrium depends on the interactions between the molecules in the compound and the solvent. Polarity and nonpolarity are the main factors in determining how well a solvent interacts with a compound. Cyclohexane is considered nonpolar, meaning that there is no electronegative difference between its bonds and its overall structure is symmetrical. Due to this, when cyclohexane is immersed in a polar solvent, it will have less solvent distribution, which signifies a poor interaction between the solvent and solute. This produces a limited catalytic effect. Moreover, when cyclohexane comes into contact with a nonpolar solvent, the solvent distribution is much greater, showing a strong interaction between the solvent and solute. This strong interaction yields a heighten catalytic effect.

== Heterocyclic analogs ==
Heterocyclic analogs of cyclohexane are pervasive in sugars, piperidines, dioxanes, etc. They exist generally follow the trends seen for cyclohexane, i.e. the chair conformer being most stable. The axial–equatorial equilibria (A values) are however strongly affected by the replacement of a methylene by O or NH. Illustrative are the conformations of the glucosides. 1,2,4,5-Tetrathiane ((CH_{2}S_{2})_{2}) lacks the unfavorable 1,3-diaxial interactions of cyclohexane. Consequently, its twist-boat conformation is populated; in the corresponding tetramethyl structure, 3,3,6,6-tetramethyl-1,2,4,5-tetrathiane, the twist-boat conformation dominates.

== Historical background ==
In 1890, Hermann Sachse, a 28-year-old assistant in Berlin, published instructions for folding a piece of paper to represent two forms of cyclohexane he called symmetrical and asymmetrical (what we would now call chair and boat). He clearly understood that these forms had two positions for the hydrogen atoms (again, to use modern terminology, axial and equatorial), that two chairs would probably interconvert, and even how certain substituents might favor one of the chair forms (Sachse–Mohr theory). Because he expressed all this in mathematical language, few chemists of the time understood his arguments. He had several attempts at publishing these ideas, but none succeeded in capturing the imagination of chemists. His death in 1893 at the age of 31 meant his ideas sank into obscurity. It was only in 1918 that Ernst Mohr, based on the molecular structure of diamond that had recently been solved using the then very new technique of X-ray crystallography, was able to successfully argue that Sachse's chair was the pivotal motif. Derek Barton and Odd Hassel shared the 1969 Nobel Prize in Chemistry for work on the conformations of cyclohexane and various other molecules.

== Practical applications ==
Cyclohexane is the most stable of the cycloalkanes, due to the stability of adapting to its chair conformer. This conformer stability allows cyclohexane to be used as a standard in lab analyses. More specifically, cyclohexane is used as a standard for pharmaceutical reference in solvent analysis of pharmaceutical compounds and raw materials. This specific standard signifies that cyclohexane is used in quality analysis of food and beverages, pharmaceutical release testing, and pharmaceutical method development; these various methods test for purity, biosafety, and bioavailability of products. The stability of the chair conformer of cyclohexane gives the cycloalkane a versatile and important application when regarding the safety and properties of pharmaceuticals.
