= A value =

Measurements of stable atom orientations

The A-value for a methyl group is 1.74 as derived from the chemical equilibrium above. This means it costs 1.74 kcal/mol (7.3 kJ/mol) of energy to have a methyl group in the axial position compared to the equatorial position.

A-values are numerical values used in the determination of the most stable orientation of atoms in a molecule (conformational analysis), as well as a general representation of steric bulk. A-values are derived from energy measurements of the different cyclohexane conformations of a monosubstituted cyclohexane chemical. Substituents on a cyclohexane ring prefer to reside in the equatorial position to the axial. The difference in Gibbs free energy (ΔG) between the higher energy conformation (axial substitution) and the lower energy conformation (equatorial substitution) is the A-value for that particular substituent.

== Utility ==
A-values help predict the conformation of cyclohexane rings. The most stable conformation will be the one which has the substituent or substituents equatorial. When multiple substituents are taken into consideration, the conformation where the substituent with the largest A-value is equatorial is favored.

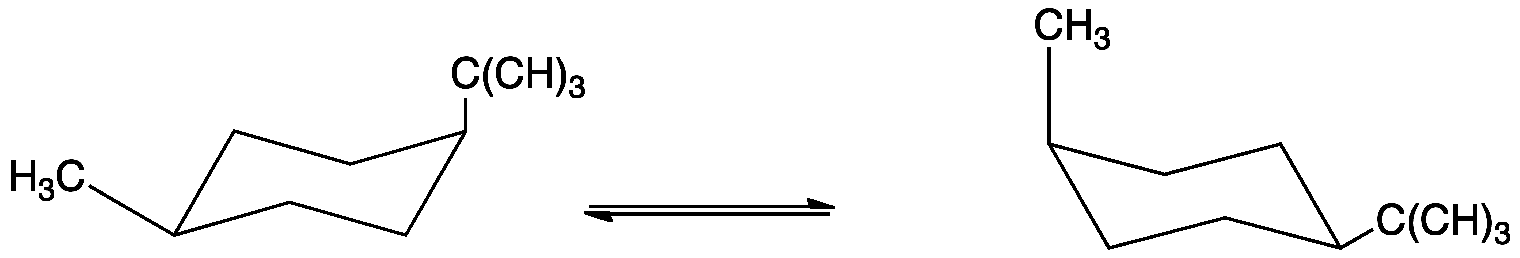
A methyl substituent has a significantly smaller A-value than a tert-butyl substituent; therefore the most stable conformation has the tert-butyl in the equatorial position.

The utility of A-values can be generalized for use outside of cyclohexane conformations. A-values can help predict the steric effect of a substituent. In general, the larger a substituent's A-value, the larger the steric effect of that substituent. A methyl group has an A-value of 1.74 while tert-butyl group has an A-value of ~5. Because the A-value of tert-butyl is higher, tert-butyl has a larger steric effect than methyl. This difference in steric effects can be used to help predict reactivity in chemical reactions.

== Free energy considerations ==
Steric effects play a major role in the assignment of configurations in cyclohexanes. One can use steric hindrances to determine the propensity of a substituent to reside in the axial or equatorial plane. It is known that axial bonds are more hindered than the corresponding equatorial bonds. This is because substituents in the axial position are relatively close to two other axial substituents. This makes it very crowded when bulky substituents are oriented in the axial position. These types of steric interactions are commonly known as 1,3 diaxial interactions. These types of interactions are not present with substituents at the equatorial position.

There are generally considered three principle contributions to the conformational free energy:

1. Baeyer strain, defined as the strain arising from deformation of bond angles.
2. Pitzer strain, defined as the torsional strain arising from 1,2 interactions between groups attached to contiguous carbons,
3. Van der Waals interactions, which are similar to 1,3 diaxial interactions.

=== Enthalpic components ===
When comparing relative stability, 6- and 7-atom interactions can be used to approximate differences in enthalpy between conformations. Each 6-atom interaction is worth 0.9 kcal/mol (3.8 kJ/mol) and each 7-atom interaction is worth 4 kcal/mol (17 kJ/mol).

The dashed lines indicate 6-atom interactions found in this conformation of ethyl cyclohexane, which amounts to approximately 2.7 kcal/mol (11 kJ/mol) in the enthalpic term of Free Energy.

The dashed lines here signify the 7 atom interactions, which contribute approximately 8 kcal/mol (33 kJ/mol) to the enthalpic term making this conformation unrealistically high in energy.

=== Entropic components ===
Entropy also plays a role in a substituent's preference for the equatorial position. The entropic component is determined by the following formula:

$$\Delta S = R \ln \sigma$$

Where σ is equal to the number of microstates available for each conformation.

Possible axial conformations of ethyl cyclohexane.

Possible equatorial conformations of ethyl cyclohexane.

Due to the larger number of possible conformations of ethyl cyclohexane, the A value is reduced from what would be predicted based purely on enthalpic terms. Due to these favorable entropic conditions, the steric relevance of an ethyl group is similar to that of a methyl substituent.

== Table of A-values ==
A-values (in kcal/mol) of some common substituents
Substituent	A-value	Substituent	A-value	Substituent	A-value
D	0.006	CH_{2}Br	1.79	OSi(CH_{3})_{3}	0.74
F	0.15	CH(CH_{3})_{2}	3.0	OH	0.87
Cl	0.43	c-C_{6}H_{11}	2.15	OCH_{3}	0.6
Br	0.38	C(CH_{3})_{3}	>4	OCD_{3}	0.56
I	0.43	Ph	2.5	OCH_{2}CH_{3}	0.9
CN	0.17	CO_{2}H	1.35	O-Ac	0.6
NC	0.21	CO_{2}^{−}	1.92	O-TFA	0.68
NCO	0.51	CO_{2}CH_{3}	1.27	OCHO	0.27
NCS	0.28	CO_{2}Et	1.2	O-Ts	0.5
N=C=NR	1	CO_{2}^{i}Pr	0.96	ONO_{2}	0.59
CH_{3}	1.7	COCl	1.25	NH_{2}	1.6
CF_{3}	2.1	COCH_{3}	1.17	NHCH_{3}	1
CH_{2}CH_{3}	1.75	SH	0.9	N(CH_{3})_{2}	2.1
CH=CH_{2}	1.35	SMe	0.7	NH_{3}^{+}	1.9
CCH	0.41	SPh	0.8	NO_{2}	1.1
CH_{2}^{t}Bu	2	S^{−}	1.3	HgBr	~0
CH_{2}OTs	1.75	SOPh	1.9	HgCl	0.3
		SO_{2}Ph	2.5	Si(CH_{3})_{3}	2.5

== Applications ==
=== Predicting reactivity ===
One of the original experiments performed by Winston and Holness was measuring the rate of oxidation in trans and cis substituted rings using a chromium catalyst. The large tert-butyl group used locks the conformation of each molecule, placing it equatorial (cis compound shown).

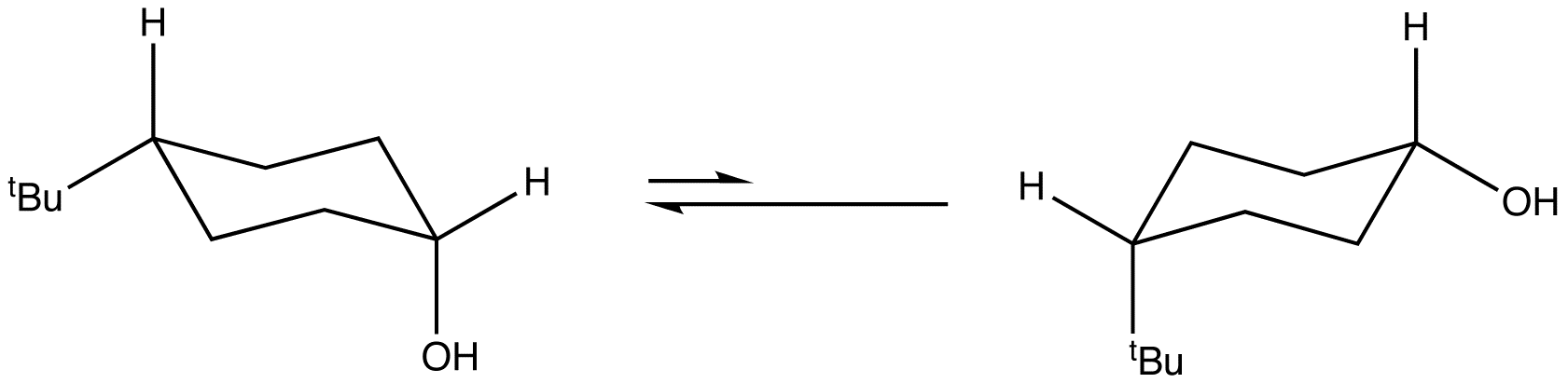
Possible chair conformations of cis-4-tert-butyl-cyclohexan-1-ol

It was observed that the cis compound underwent oxidation at a much faster rate than the trans compound. The proposition was that the large hydroxyl group in the axial position was disfavored and formed the carbonyl more readily to relieve this strain. The trans compound had rates identical to those found in the monosubstituted cyclohexanol.

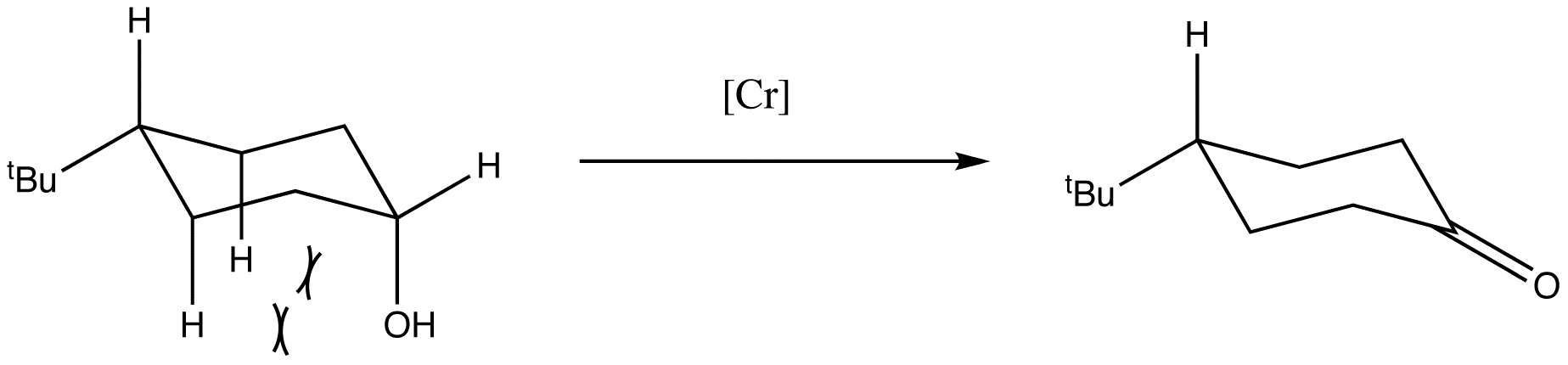
Chromium oxidation of cis-4-tert-butyl-cyclohexan-1-ol

=== Approximating intramolecular force strength using A-values ===
Using the A-values of the hydroxyl and isopropyl subunit, the energetic value of a favorable intramolecular hydrogen bond can be calculated.

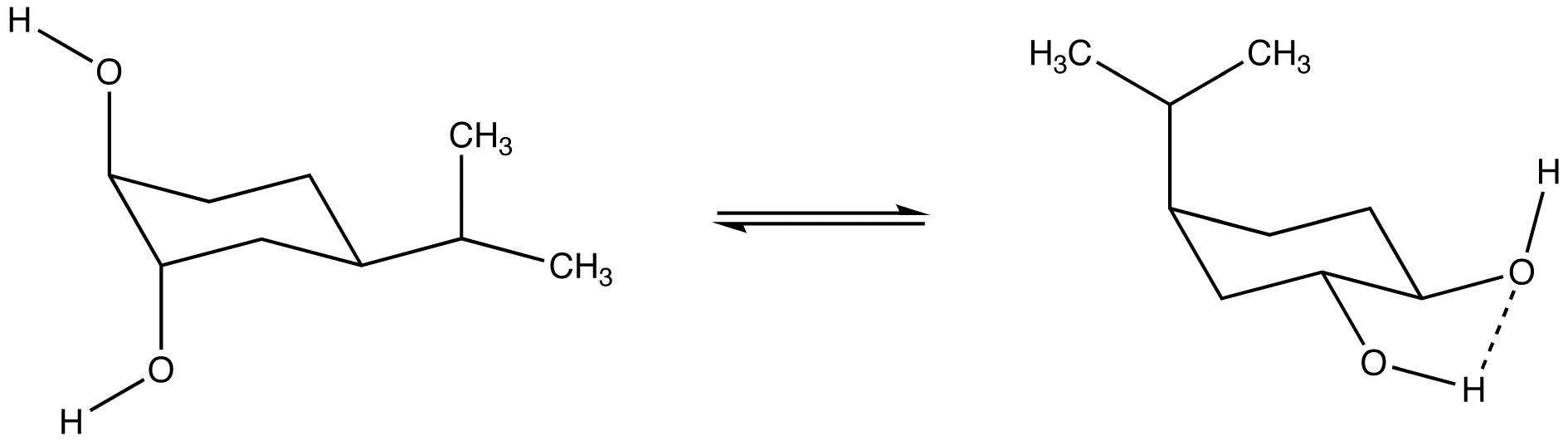
Possible chair conformations and the favorable hydrogen bond available in the conformation where both hydroxyl substituents are equatorial

== Limitations ==
A-Values are measured using a mono-substituted cyclohexane ring, and are an indication of only the sterics a particular substituent imparts on the molecule. This leads to a problem when there are possible stabilizing electronic factors in a different system. The carboxylic acid substituent shown below is axial in the ground state, despite a positive A-value. From this observation, it is clear that there are other possible electronic interactions that stabilize the axial conformation.

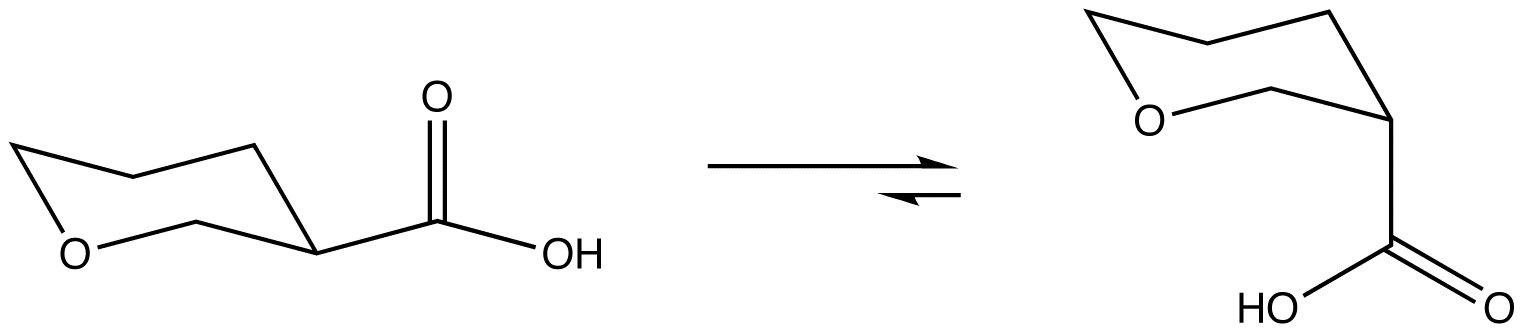
Equilibrium representation of a chair flip of a carboxylic acid; the axial position is preferred due to favorable electronic factors, despite a steric bias favoring the equatorial position.

Other preferences for the axial conformation can arise from the anomeric effect, gauche interactions, small adjacent spirocycles and more.

== Other considerations ==
A-values do not predict the physical size of a molecule, only the steric effect. For example, the tert-butyl group (A-value=4.9) has a larger A-value than the trimethylsilyl group (A-value=2.5), yet the tert-butyl group actually occupies less space. This difference can be attributed to the longer length of the carbon–silicon bond as compared to the carbon–carbon bond of the tert-butyl group. The longer bond allows for less interactions with neighboring substituents, which effectively makes the trimethylsilyl group less sterically hindering, thus, lowering its A-value. This can also be seen when comparing the halogens. Bromine, iodine, and chlorine all have similar A-values even though their atomic radii differ. A-values then, predict the apparent size of a substituent, and the relative apparent sizes determine the differences in steric effects between compounds. Thus, A-values are useful tools in determining compound reactivity in chemical reactions.
