= C8H14 =

The molecular formula C_{8}H_{14} (molar mass: 110.20 g/mol) may refer to:

- Allylcyclopentane
- Biisobutenyl
- Bimethallyl
- Cyclooctenes
  - cis-Cyclooctene
  - trans-Cyclooctene
- Methylcycloheptene
- Methylenecycloheptane
- 1,7-Octadiene
- Octynes
  - 1-Octyne
  - 2-Octyne
  - 3-Octyne
  - 4-Octyne
- Bicyclooctane
  - Bicyclo[2.2.2]octane
  - Bicyclo[3.3.0]octane
  - Bicyclo[3.2.1]octane
