= C10H18 =

The molecular formula C_{10}H_{18} may refer to:

- Bornane
- Cyclodecene
- Decalin
- Decynes
  - 1-Decyne
  - 2-Decyne
  - 3-Decyne
  - 4-Decyne
  - 5-Decyne, also known as dibutylethyne
- Spirodecane
