= C6H10 =

The molecular formula C_{6}H_{10} (molar mass: 82.14 g/mol) may refer to many dozens of compounds. Some well studied examples:

- Cyclohexene
- 2,3-Dimethyl-1,3-butadiene
- 1,2-Hexadiene
- 1,3-Hexadiene
- 1,4-Hexadiene
- 1,5-Hexadiene
- 2,4-Hexadiene
- 1-Hexyne
- 2-Hexyne
- 3-Hexyne
- Methylenecyclopentane
- Bicyclo[2.1.1]hexane
- 3,3-Dimethyl-1-butyne
- 4-Methyl-1-pentyne
- 4-Methyl-2-pentyne
- 3-Methyl-1-pentyne
