= Octyne =

Octynes are alkynes with one triple bond and the molecular formula C_{8}H_{14}.

The isomers are:

- 1-Octyne
- 2-Octyne
- 3-Octyne
- 4-Octyne
