= Cycloalkene =

Hydrocarbon compound containing a non-aromatic ring with a C=C bond

In organic chemistry, a cycloalkene or cycloolefin is a type of alkene hydrocarbon which contains a closed ring of carbon atoms and either one or more double bonds, but has no aromatic character. Some cycloalkenes, such as cyclobutene and cyclopentene, can be used as monomers to produce polymer chains. Due to geometrical considerations, smaller cycloalkenes are almost always the cis isomers, and the term cis tends to be omitted from the names. Cycloalkenes require considerable p-orbital overlap in the form of a bridge between the carbon-carbon double bond; however, this is not feasible in smaller molecules due to the increase of strain that could break the molecule apart. In greater carbon number cycloalkenes, the addition of CH_{2} substituents decreases strain. trans-Cycloalkenes with 7 or fewer carbons in the ring will not occur under normal conditions because of the large amount of ring strain needed. In larger rings (8 or more atoms), cis–trans isomerism of the double bond may occur. This stability pattern forms part of the origin of Bredt's rule, the observation that alkenes do not form at the bridgehead of many types of bridged ring systems because the alkene would necessarily be trans in one of the rings.

== Examples ==
Cyclopropene

Cyclobutene

Cyclopentene

Cyclohexene

Cycloheptene

Cyclopentadiene

1,3-Cyclohexadiene

1,4-Cyclohexadiene

Cycloheptatriene

1,5-Cyclooctadiene

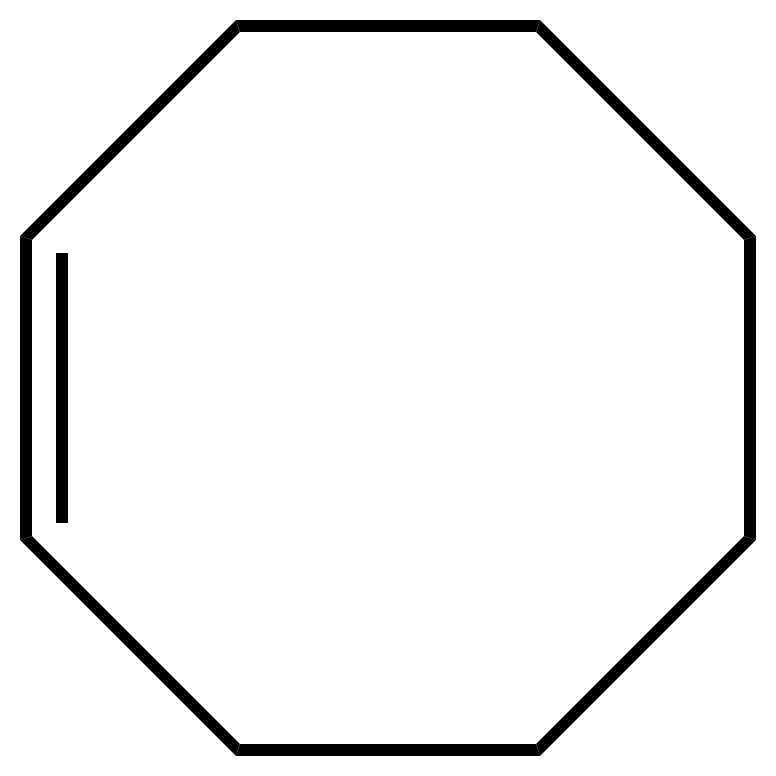
cis-cyclooctene

trans-cyclooctene

== Nomenclature ==
Cycloalkenes follow a similar nomenclature system to alkenes, but the carbons are numbered starting at a carbon on the double bond and then through the double bond and around the ring. This method is used to keep the index numbers small.

1-methylcyclohexene

3-methylcyclohexene

== Properties ==
Cycloalkenes with a small ring have about 20° more bond angle strain than a cycloalkane of the same size. This is because the bond angle for an alkene, C-C=C, is 122°, while the bond angle for an alkane, C-C-C, is 112°. When these carbons form a small ring, the alkene which has a larger bond angle will have to compress more than the alkane causing more bond angle strain.

Cycloalkenes have a lower melting point than cycloalkanes of the same size. The lowered melting point is due to the double bond preventing the compound from compact packing.

Cycloalkenes generally reflect physical properties of their cycloalkane. In physical states, only the smaller cycloalkenes are gases while the others are mostly liquid. These molecules are also more reactive than cycloalkanes due to increased electron density shifts of the double bond.

== Trans isomers ==
As previously mentioned, cis-isomers of cycloalkenes exhibit more stability than trans-isomers; however, on an experimental and computational level, this property is only applicable to cycloalkenes with 10 carbons or less. As the number of carbons increase, the possibility of a trans-isomer occurring also increase. The geometrical considerations as analyzed by computational analysis are as follows.

The most stable trans-isomers of 10 ring or greater cycloalkenes exhibit 4 irregularities from standard geometric norms. The first irregularity is twisted planes of substituents along the C=C. Using C=C as the stable axis, 2 substituents of 1 carbon can be visualized on the same plane, equally applied to the other carbon. These planes are not planar and instead one carbon substituent plane twists along the axis away or toward the other carbon’s plane. This twisting leads to pyramidalization forming a pyramidal alkene which is the second irregularity. A greater angle of twisting, usually results in lower carbon number rings and decreases as the carbon number increases. Pyramidalization is important in highered number rings, because it increases p-orbital overlap for stability, and reduces torsional strain.

Bond length between the C=C and corresponding vinylic carbons also vary. In smaller cycloalkenes, it is expected for the bonds to be greater in length uniformly to account for increased strain, but for example, trans-cycloheptane has varying bond lengths. Also, the vinylic carbons on trans cyclohexanes exhibit longer bond lengths than their respective cis isomer for trans-cycloheptane through trans-cyclononene (7 carbon and 9 carbon cycloalkenes).

== Synthesis reactions ==
=== Ring-closing metathesis ===
Ring-closing metathesis switches out functional groups from one or multiple terminal alkenes to form a cycloalkene. This process can be used to form cycloalkenes of either E or Z configurations, depending on the stereochemistry of the second ring strain.

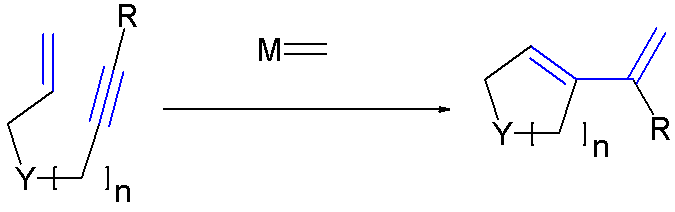
Formation of a cycloalkane via ring closing metathesis

=== Birch reduction ===
Birch reduction is a possible method to reduce aromatic compounds into cycloalkenes, specifically cyclohexadiene.

Formation of a cycloalkane via Birch Reduction

=== Diels-Alder reaction ===
The Diels-Alder reaction, also known as cycloaddition, combines a conjugated diene and an alkene to form cycloalkene. This is a concerted process, with bonds forming and breaking simultaneously.

Formation of a cycloalkane via a Diels-Alder Reaction

=== Cyclization reactions ===
Cyclization reactions, or intramolecular addition reactions, can be used to form cycloalkenes. These reactions primarily form cyclopentenones, a cycloalkene that contains two functional groups: the cyclopentene and a ketone group. However, other cycloalkenes, such as Cyclooctatetraene, can be formed as a result of this reaction.

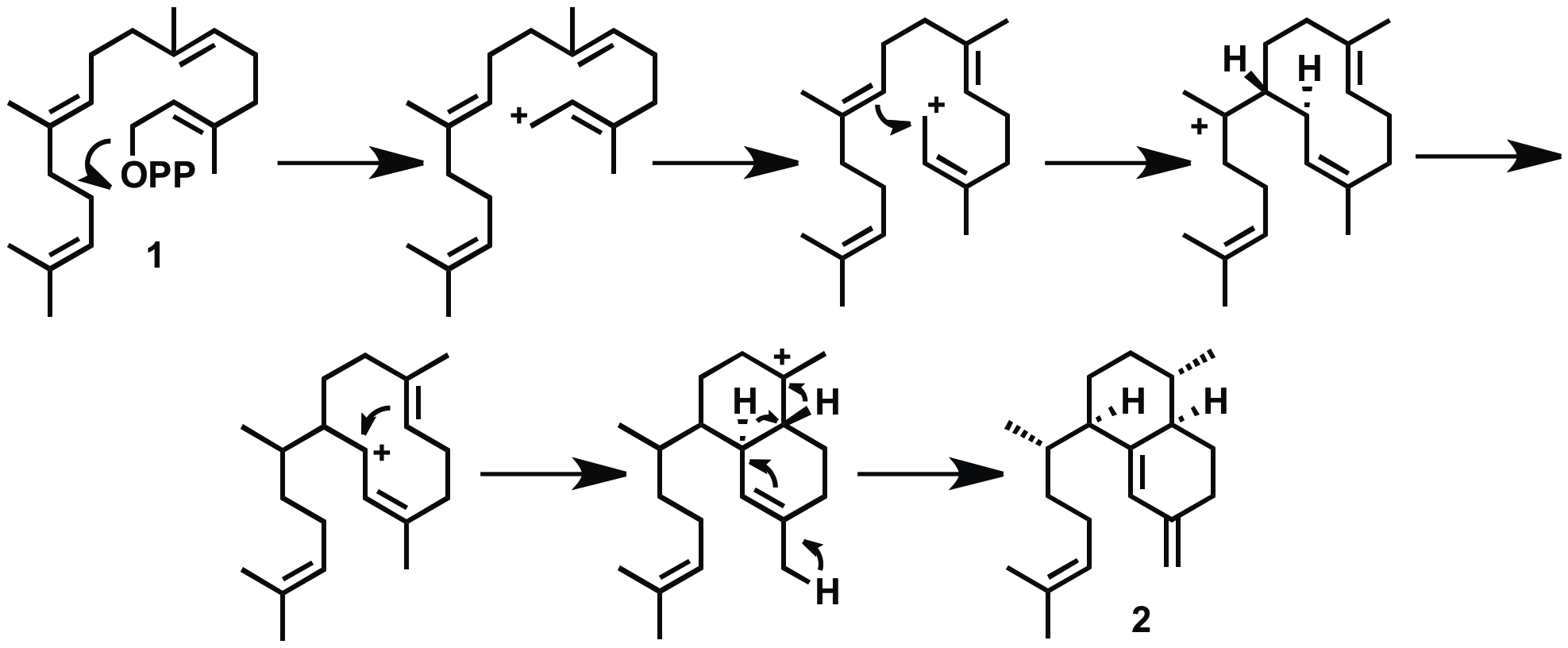
Formation of a cyclohexane from a non-cyclic compound via a Cyclization Reaction

=== Electrocyclic reactions ===
Reactions of conjugated double-bond systems can be synthesized into cycloalkenes through electrocyclic reactions. Addition of heat or photolysis causes a reversible reaction that causes one pi bond to become a sigma bond, which closes the ring and creates a cycloalkene.

Formation of a cycloalkane via an electrocyclic reaction

=== Intramolecular McMurry reaction ===
When two carbonyl groups are coupled and undergo a McMurry reaction, there is a possibility of the formation of cycloalkenes under specific conditions. When both carbonyls are within the same molecule and not sufficiently separated from each other, a cycloalkene can be formed through an intramolecular McMurry reaction.

== See also ==
- Perfluorocycloalkene (PFCA)
- Alicyclic compound
- Olefin
- Cycloalkyne
- Cycloalkane
- White spirit
