= Hexyne =

The hexynes are a subgroup from the group of alkynes. It consists of several isomeric compounds having the formula C_{6}H_{10}.

The linear and branched members are:

- 1-Hexyne (n-butylacetylene)
- 2-Hexyne (methylpropylacetylene)
- 3-Hexyne (diethylacetylene)
- 3-methylpent-1-yne
- 4-methylpent-1-yne
- 4-methylpent-2-yne
- 3,3-dimethylbut-1-yne
