= Cycloheptene =

cis-Cycloheptene

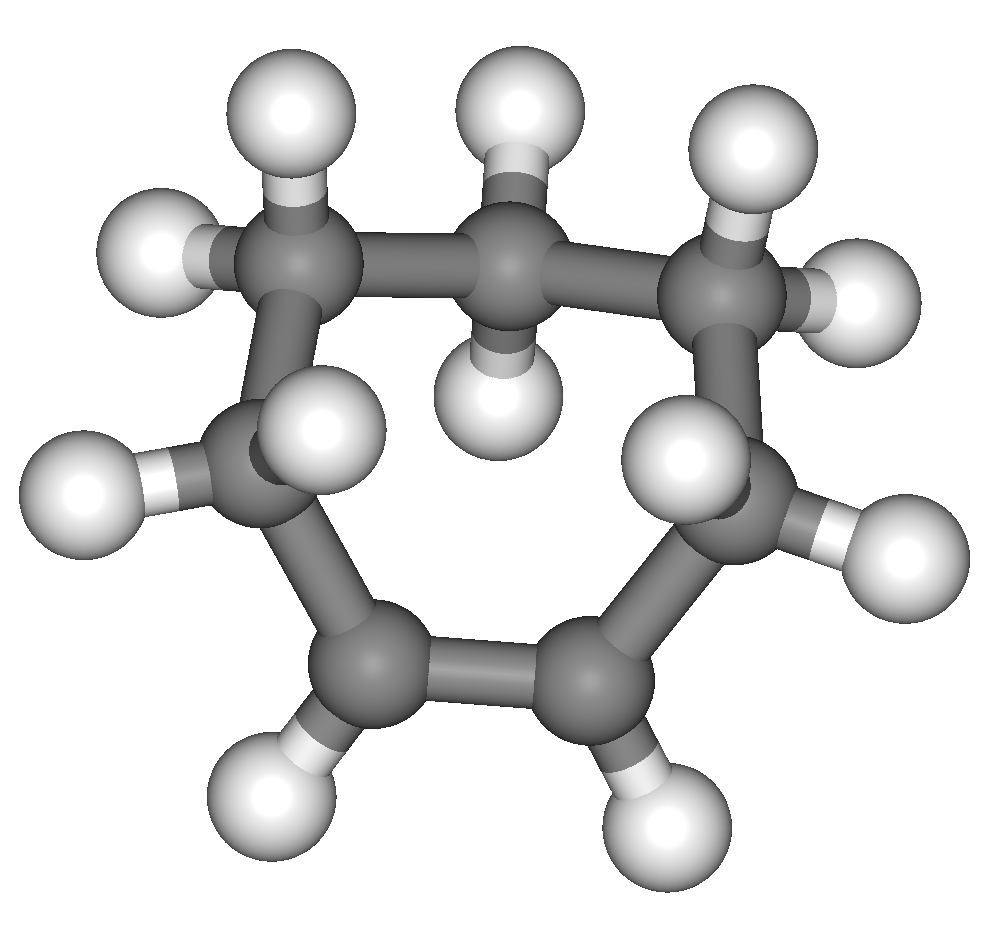

Names
- Preferred IUPAC name Cycloheptene
- Other names cis-Cycloheptene

Identifiers
CAS Number	628-92-2
3D model (JSmol)	Interactive image
ChemSpider	11857
ECHA InfoCard	100.010.056
PubChem CID	12363
UNII	KRY3SY05AH
CompTox Dashboard (EPA)	DTXSID4074560
- InChI: InChI=1S/C7H12/c1-2-4-6-7-5-3-1/h1-2H,3-7H2 Key: ZXIJMRYMVAMXQP-UHFFFAOYSA-N; InChI=1/C7H12/c1-2-4-6-7-5-3-1/h1-2H,3-7H2 Key: ZXIJMRYMVAMXQP-UHFFFAOYAQ
- SMILES: C\1=C\CCCCC/1

Properties
Chemical formula	C_{7}H_{12}
Molar mass	96.17 g/mol
Density	0.824 g/cm^{3}
Boiling point	112 to 114.7 °C (233.6 to 238.5 °F; 385.1 to 387.8 K)
- Except where otherwise noted, data are given for materials in their standard state (at 25 °C [77 °F], 100 kPa). verify (what is ?) Infobox references

Cycloheptene is a 7-membered cycloalkene with a flash point of −6.7 °C. It is a raw material in organic chemistry and a monomer in polymer synthesis. Cycloheptene can exist as either the cis- or the trans-isomer.

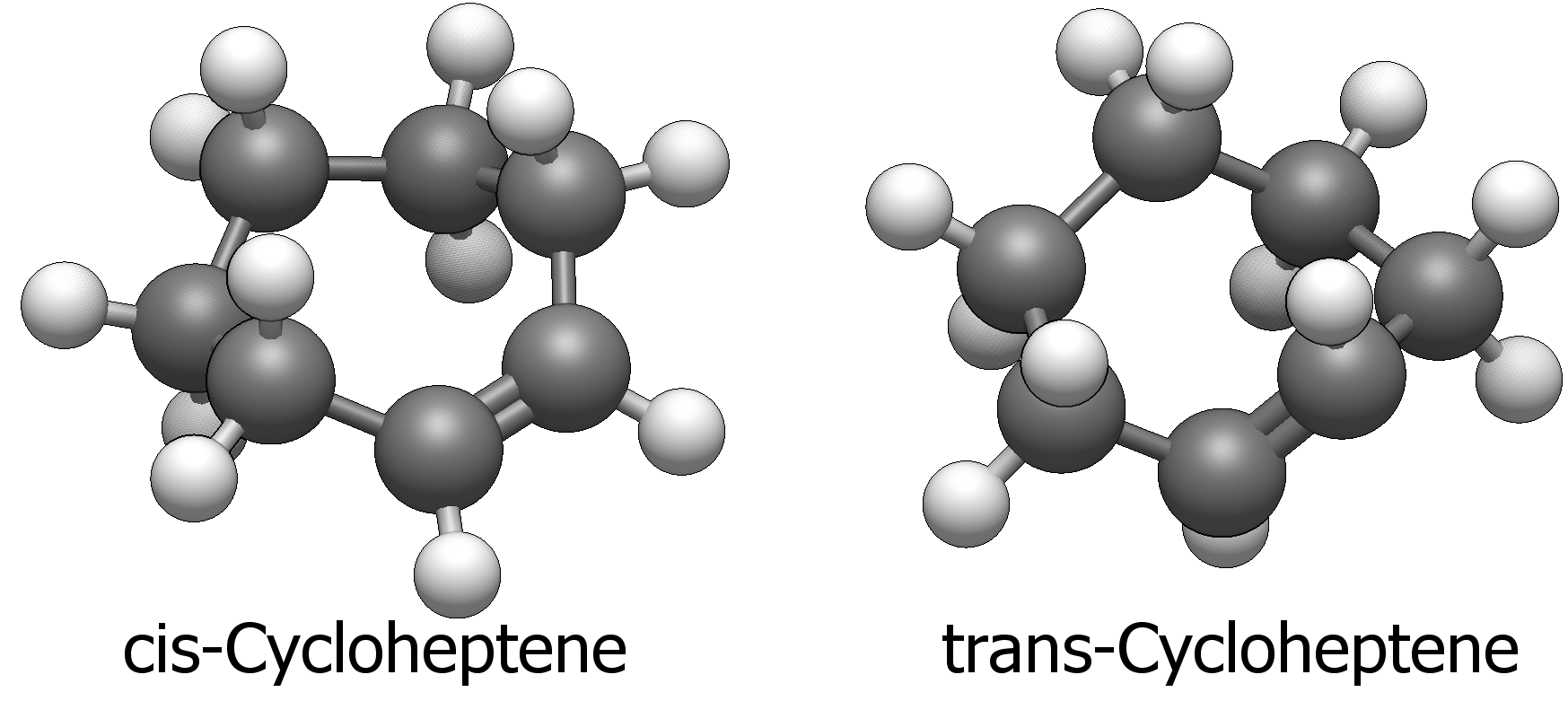

== trans-Cycloheptene ==
Under normal conditions, the cycloheptene double bond forms the cis isomer. However, the unstable, anti-Bredt, trans isomer is an accessible reactive intermediate. Methyl benzoate catalyzes singlet photosensitization; irradiating cis-cycloheptene and it with ultraviolet light at −35 °C produces a detectible trans-cycloheptene population.

The trans isomer is very strained, and the unsaturated carbons are partly pyramidal. The pyramidalization angle is estimated at 37° and the p orbital misalignment 30.1°. The isomer decomposes facily through a dimolecular, diradical pathway, even at temperatures too low for double-bond rotation.
