= Decyne =

Decynes are alkynes with one triple bond and the molecular formula C_{10}H_{18}.

The isomers are:

- 1-Decyne
- 2-Decyne
- 3-Decyne
- 4-Decyne
- 5-Decyne
