= 1,2-Dibromohexane =

Names
- IUPAC name 1,2-Dibromohexane

Identifiers
CAS Number	624-20-4
3D model (JSmol)	Interactive image
ChemSpider	92527
EC Number	613-031-5
PubChem CID	102451
CompTox Dashboard (EPA)	DTXSID40883511
- InChI: InChI=1S/C6H12Br2/c1-2-3-4-6(8)5-7/h6H,2-5H2,1H3 Key: NUUUANNAZVEWHM-UHFFFAOYSA-N
- SMILES: CCCCC(CBr)Br

Properties
Chemical formula	C_{6}H_{12}Br_{2}
Molar mass	243.970 g·mol^{−1}
Appearance	Colorless liquid
Boiling point	90 °C (194 °F; 363 K) (2.4 kPa)
Refractive index (n_{D})	1.5010 (20 °C)

Hazards
- GHS labelling
Pictograms	(GHS07: Exclamation mark)
Signal word	Warning
Hazard statements	H315, H319, H335
Precautionary statements	P261, P264, P264+P265, P271, P280, P302+P352, P304+P340, P305+P351+P338, P319, P321, P332+P317, P337+P317, P362+P364, P403+P233, P405, P501
- Except where otherwise noted, data are given for materials in their standard state (at 25 °C [77 °F], 100 kPa). Infobox references

1,2-Dibromohexane is a haloalkane with the chemical formula C_{6}H_{12}Br_{2}. It is a colorless liquid with a relatively high boiling point (90 °C).

== Synthesis and reactions ==
1,2-Dibromohexane can be prepared by the bromination of 1-hexene. Elemental bromine and 1-hexene react together in an inert solvent to give 1,2-dibromohexane in high yields.

1,2-Dibromohexane can be used to synthesize 1-hexyne by reacting it with potassium hydroxide in triethylene glycol in a dehydrohalogenation reaction. Alternatively, it also reacts with sodium amide in ammonia to yield 1-hexyne.
