= Cyclooctene =

Chemical compound

Possible isomers of cyclooctene.

Cyclooctene is the cycloalkene with a formula C_{8}H_{14}. Its molecule has a ring of 8 carbon atoms, connected by seven single bonds and one double bond.

Cyclooctene is notable because it is the smallest cycloalkene that can exist stably as either the cis or trans stereoisomer, with cis-cyclooctene being the most common. Theoretical analysis implies a total of 16 conformational and configurational isomers, all chiral, forming 8 enantiomeric pairs. The cis isomer can adopt various conformations, the most stable one being shaped like a ribbon. The most stable conformation of trans-cyclooctene is shaped like the 8-carbon equivalent of the chair conformation of cyclohexane.

Longer cycloalkene rings such as the ten-carbon cyclodecene also occur as cis and trans isomers.
