= Julius Bredt =

German organic chemist (1855–1937)

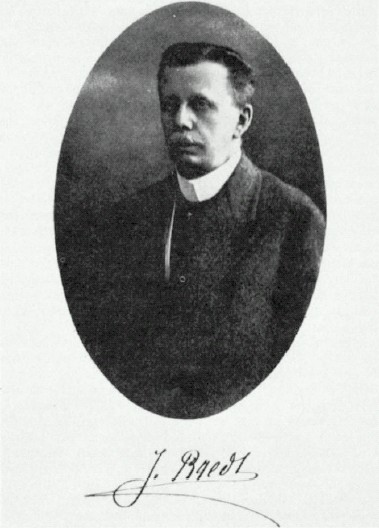
- Julius Bredt
- Born: 29 March 1855; Berlin, Germany
- Died: 21 September 1937 (aged 82); Aachen, Germany
- Education: University of Strasbourg
- Known for: Bredt's rule
- Scientific career
- Workplaces: Aachen University of Technology
- Doctoral advisor: Rudolph Fittig

Julius Bredt (29 March 1855 – 21 September 1937) was a German organic chemist. He was the first to determine, in 1893, the correct structure of camphor. Bredt also proposed in 1924 that a double bond cannot be placed at the bridgehead of a bridged ring system, a statement now known as Bredt's rule. The rule however, has been contradicted since, by a publication 100 years later.

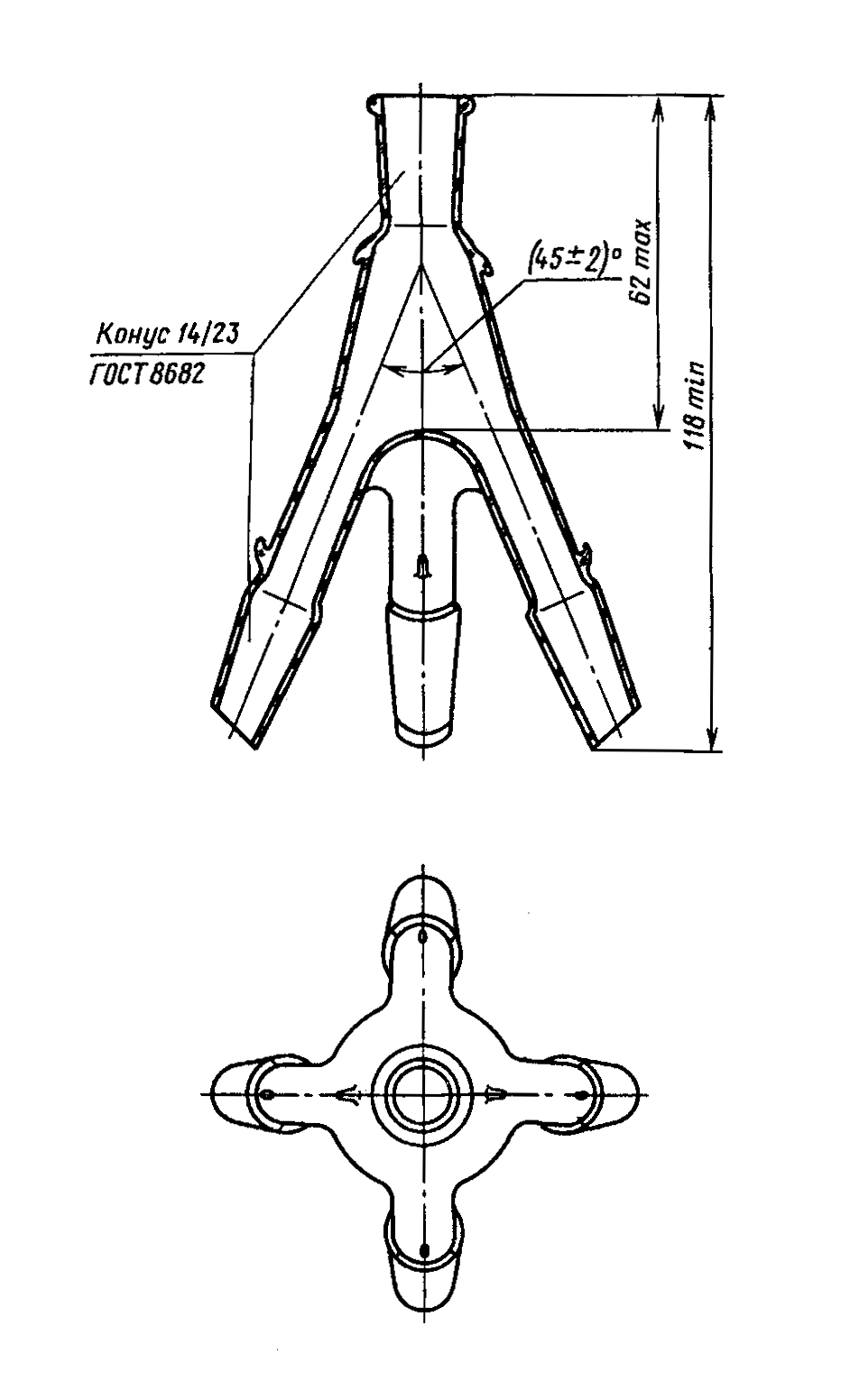
Bredt distributor - ground glass adapter invented by Bredt

== Awards ==
There is a Julius Bredt lecture in his remembrance at the RWTH Aachen University.
