= Supramolecular chirality =

Supramolecular assemblies that are non-superposable on their mirror images

In chemistry, the term supramolecular chirality is used to describe supramolecular assemblies that are non-superposable on their mirror images.

Chirality in supramolecular chemistry implies the non-symmetric arrangement of molecular components in a non-covalent assembly. Chirality may arise in a supramolecular system if one of its component is chiral or if achiral components arrange in a non symmetrical way to produce a supermolecule that is chiral.
