= Kenneth Nyitray Trueblood =

American chemist

Kenneth Nyitray Trueblood (1920–1998) was an American chemist known for pioneering work in the use of computers to determine chemical structures. His work is recognized as significantly contributing to Nobel Prizes being awarded to his long-term collaborators Dorothy Hodgkin and Donald Cram. He published 140 research papers. His organization of a departmental X-ray crystallography lab served as a worldwide model for other chemistry departments.

Trueblood was a Guggenheim fellow for the academic year 1976–1977. He was chair of the UCLA Department of Chemistry from 1965 to 1970 and 1990–1991. He was dean of UCLA's College of Letters and Science from 1971 to 1974, and chair of its Academic Senate from 1983 to 1984.

In 2018, UCLA created the Kenneth N. Trueblood Endowed Chair in Chemistry & Biochemistry and appointed Neil K. Garg as the inaugural chairholder.
