= Neil Garg =

American organic chemist

Neil K. Garg
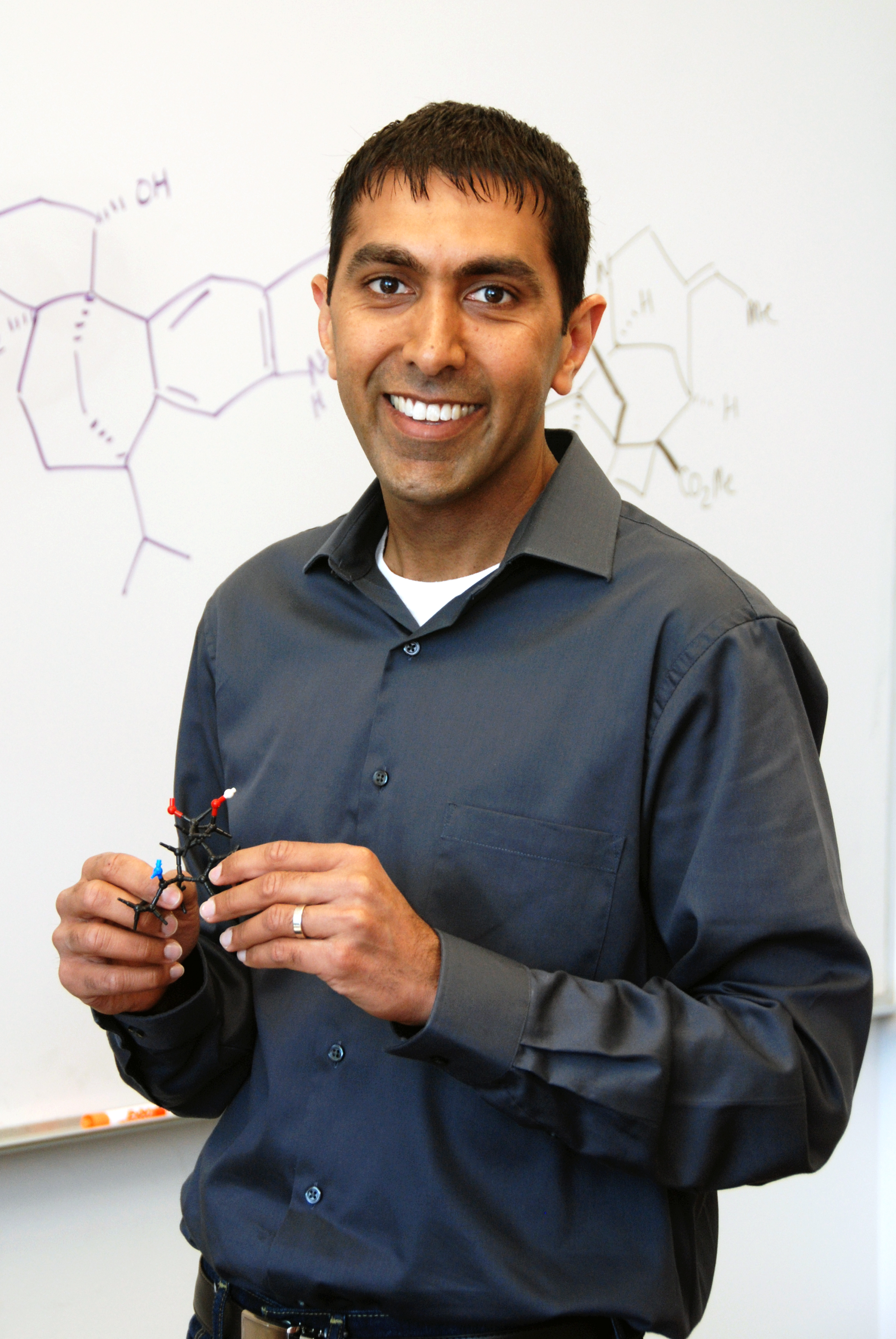
- Neil Garg is a Distinguished Professor in the Department of Chemistry and Biochemistry at UCLA.
- Born: December 18, 1978 (age 47)
- Education: NYU (B.S., 2000); California Institute of Technology (Ph.D., 2005)
- Awards: Centenary Prize (RSC), David A. Evans Award (ACS), Robert Foster Cherry Award, Elias J. Corey Award, Arthur C. Cope Scholar Award (ACS), Guggenheim Fellowship, Mukaiyama Award, Horizon Prize (RSC)
- Scientific career
- Fields: Chemistry
- Workplaces: University of California, Irvine; University of California, Los Angeles
- Doctoral advisor: Brian M. Stoltz
- Other academic advisors: Marc Walters (Undergraduate, NYU); Larry Overman (Postdoc, UC Irvine)
- Website: https://garg.chem.ucla.edu

Neil K. Garg is a Distinguished professor of chemistry and holds the Kenneth N. Trueblood Endowed Chair at the University of California, Los Angeles.

Garg's research is in synthetic and physical organic chemistry. His group challenges long-standing paradigms of reactivity and develops practical synthetic methods.

The Garg lab is known for making breakthroughs in catalysis, especially strong bond activation of esters and amides using nickel catalysts, and in the understanding and use of distorted, strained intermediates, such as arynes, cyclic alkynes, cyclic allenes, and cyclic 1,2,3-trienes. In 2024, they developed practical synthetic chemistry of anti-Bredt olefins, addressing the 100-year old textbook rule known as Bredt's Rule. They also developed synthetic chemistry of cubene and quadricyclene and brought the physical organic chemistry concepts of alkene pyramidalization and twisting, non-integer bond orders, and diradicaloids to the synthetic community.

The Garg laboratory has completed the total syntheses of many natural products, including welwitindolinones, akuammilines, tubingensin alkaloids, and lissodendoric acid A. In 2020, Garg co-Founded ElectraTect, Inc.

Garg is also a prominent educator and science communicator. He has received many accolades for his classroom teaching, including the Cherry Award. He has inspired a series of student-created music videos to encourage students to learn organic chemistry. He has led other projects, such as the Organic Coloring Book series, The O-Chem (Re)-Activity Book, the Backside Attack smartphone app, QR Chem, RS Chemistry, Virtual Reality Chemistry, ChemMatch, Biology And Chemistry Online Notes (BACON). and #MentorFirst. In 2023, Garg created a successful summer camp called Chem Kids to teach organic chemistry to children.

== Career ==
Garg received his B.S. from New York University in 2000. He went on to earn his Ph.D. at the California Institute of Technology, where he studied organic chemistry under the supervision of Brian Stoltz as a DoD NDSEG Fellow, completing his studies in 2005. Upon completion of his graduate work, he held an NIH post-doctoral appointment in the laboratory of Larry Overman at University of California - Irvine from 2005 to 2007.

Garg was promoted to Distinguished Professor at UCLA in 2020. In 2018, he became the inaugural holder of the Kenneth N. Trueblood Endowed Chair in Chemistry & Biochemistry. He has served as Vice Chair for the Department of Chemistry and Biochemistry (2012-2016) and (2023–present) and served as the Department Chair (2019–2023). He also served as Faculty-in-Residence in the UCLA dormitories from 2012-2021.

== Awards and honors ==
Garg has received more than fifty honors and awards for his research and teaching.

- Centenary Prize, Royal Society of Chemistry, 2026.
- ACS David A. Evans Award for the Advancement and Education of Organic Synthesis, 2025
- Horizon Prize from the Royal Society of Chemistry, 2024
- AAAS Mani L. Bhaumik Award for Public Engagement with Science, 2023
- Mukaiyama Award, 2022
- Horizon Prize from the Royal Society of Chemistry, 2021
- Edward Leete Award from the ACS, 2019
- James Flack Norris Award for Outstanding Achievement in the Teaching of Chemistry, 2019
- New York University's Distinguished Alumnus Award, 2019
- Robert Foster Cherry Award for Great Teaching, 2018
- ACS Elias J. Corey Award for Outstanding Original Contribution in Organic Synthesis, 2017
- Guggenheim Fellowship, 2016
- California's Professor of the Year, Carnegie Foundation for the Advancement of Teaching, 2015
- Arthur C. Cope Scholar Award, 2015
- Camille Dreyfus Teacher-Scholar Award, 2013
- AP Sloan Research Fellowship, 2012
