= Handedness (disambiguation) =

Handedness is a human attribute reflecting the unequal distribution of fine motor skill between the left and right hands.

Handedness may also refer to:

- Chirality, Greek for handedness, used to describe similar concepts in other fields:
  - Chirality (chemistry), a property of molecules having a non-superimposable mirror image
  - Chirality (electromagnetism), an electromagnetic propagation in chiral media
  - Chirality (mathematics), the property of a figure not being identical to its mirror image
  - Chirality (physics), when a phenomenon is not identical to its mirror image
  - Sinistral and dextral, terms in biology and geology
- Orientation (vector space), an asymmetry that makes a reflection impossible to replicate by means of a simple rotation
- Handedness of a helix, a spiral structure
  - Handedness of screw threads, springs, or propellers, in mechanics and engineering
