= 2-Hexyne =

Names
- Preferred IUPAC name Hex-2-yne

Identifiers
| CAS Number | 764-35-2 |
| 3D model (JSmol) | Interactive image |
| ChemSpider | 31016 |
| ECHA InfoCard | 100.011.015 |
| EC Number | 212-117-6 |
| PubChem CID | 33629 |
| UNII | EC0WA2IXU7 |
| CompTox Dashboard (EPA) | DTXSID9074725 |
- InChI: InChI=1S/C6H10/c1-3-5-6-4-2/h3,5H2,1-2H3 Key: MELUCTCJOARQQG-UHFFFAOYSA-N
- SMILES: CCCC#CC

Properties
| Chemical formula | C_{6}H_{10} |
| Molar mass | 82.146 g·mol^{−1} |
| Density | 0.7317 |
| Melting point | −88 °C (−126 °F; 185 K) |
| Boiling point | 83.8 °C (182.8 °F; 356.9 K) |
| Refractive index (n_{D}) | 1.4135 |

Hazards
- GHS labelling
| Pictograms | (GHS02: Flammable) (GHS07: Exclamation mark) (GHS08: Health hazard) |
| Signal word | Danger |
| Hazard statements | H225, H304, H315, H319 |
| Precautionary statements | P210, P233, P240, P241, P242, P243, P264, P280, P301+P310, P302+P352, P303+P361+P353, P305+P351+P338, P321, P331, P332+P313, P337+P313, P362, P370+P378, P403+P235, P405, P501 |

Related compounds
| Related compounds | 3-Hexyne, 1-Hexyne |
- Except where otherwise noted, data are given for materials in their standard state (at 25 °C [77 °F], 100 kPa). Infobox references

2-Hexyne is an organic compound that belongs to the alkyne group. Just like its isomers, it also has the chemical formula of C_{6}H_{10}.

== Reactions ==
2-Hexyne can be semihydrogenated to yield 2-hexene or fully hydrogenated to hexane. With appropriate noble metal catalysts it can selectively form cis-2-hexene.

2-Hexyne can act as a ligand on gold atoms.

With strong sulfuric acid, the ketone 2-hexanone is produced. However this reaction also causes polymerization and charring.

Under heat and pressure 2-hexyne polymerizes to linear oligomers and polymers. This can be hastened by some catalysts such as molybdenum pentachloride with tetraphenyl tin. However Ziegler–Natta catalysts have no action as the triple bond is hindered.
