= Allylcyclopentane =

Names
- Preferred IUPAC name (Prop-2-en-1-yl)cyclopentane
- Other names Allylcyclopentane; 2-Propenylcyclopentane; 2-Propen-1-ylcyclopentane; 3-Cyclopentyl-1-propene

Identifiers
CAS Number	3524-75-2
3D model (JSmol)	Interactive image
Beilstein Reference	4-05-00-00272
ChemSpider	69505
ECHA InfoCard	100.020.494
EC Number	222-542-9
Gmelin Reference	2036419
PubChem CID	77059
UNII	CKL3Z8PQ4A
CompTox Dashboard (EPA)	DTXSID20188733
- InChI: InChI=1/C8H14/c1-2-5-8-6-3-4-7-8/h2,8H,1,3-7H2
- SMILES: C=C\CC1CCCC1

Properties
Chemical formula	C_{8}H_{14}
Molar mass	110.200 g·mol^{−1}
Appearance	Colourless liquid
Density	0.793 g cm^{−3}
Melting point	−111 °C
Boiling point	127 °C (261 °F; 400 K)
Solubility in water	insoluble
Solubility	chloroform
log P	3.569
Vapor pressure	14.5 mmHg (at 25 °C)
Refractive index (n_{D})	1.4412

Hazards
- Occupational safety and health (OHS/OSH)
Main hazards	Highly flammable. Harmful by inhalation, in contact with skin and if swallowed.
- GHS labelling
Pictograms	(GHS02: Flammable) (GHS07: Exclamation mark)
Signal word	Danger
Hazard statements	H225, H302, H312, H332
Precautionary statements	P210, P233, P240, P241, P242, P243, P261, P264, P270, P271, P280, P301+P312, P302+P352, P303+P361+P353, P304+P312, P304+P340, P312, P322, P330, P363, P370+P378, P403+P235, P501
Flash point	13.9 °C (57.0 °F; 287.0 K) closed cup
Safety data sheet (SDS)	Sigma-Aldrich MSDS
- Except where otherwise noted, data are given for materials in their standard state (at 25 °C [77 °F], 100 kPa). Infobox references

Allylcyclopentane is a hydrocarbon that has the formula C_{8}H_{14}. This compound is a colourless liquid at room temperature. It has been prepared from cyclopentylmagnesium bromide and allyl bromide.
