= Cyclodecene =

Cycloalkene

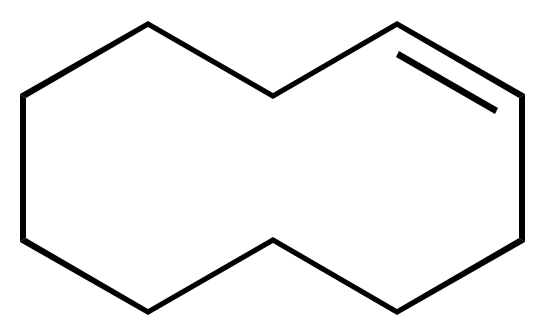
(Z)-Cyclodecene
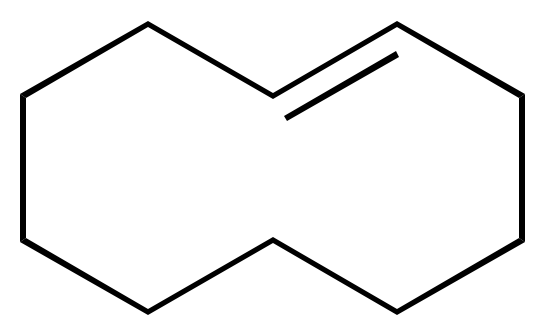
(E)-Cyclodecene

Names
- IUPAC name (Z)-Cyclodecene, (E)-Cyclodecene
- Other names cis-Cyclodecene, trans-Cyclodecene

Identifiers
CAS Number	cis Z: 935-31-9; trans E: 2198-20-1
3D model (JSmol)	cis Z: Interactive image; trans E: Interactive image
ChemSpider	cis Z: 4517575; trans E: 13044
EC Number	cis Z: 213-301-9
PubChem CID	cis Z: 5365612; trans E: 5364362
CompTox Dashboard (EPA)	cis Z: DTXSID00870806
- InChI: InChI=1S/C10H18/c1-2-4-6-8-10-9-7-5-3-1/h1-2H,3-10H2/b2-1- Key: UCIYGNATMHQYCT-UPHRSURJSA-N; trans E: InChI=1S/C10H18/c1-2-4-6-8-10-9-7-5-3-1/h1-2H,3-10H2/b2-1+ Key: UCIYGNATMHQYCT-OWOJBTEDSA-N
- SMILES: cis Z: C\1=C\CCCCCCCC/1; trans E: C1CCCC/C=C/CCC1

Properties
Chemical formula	C_{10}H_{18}
Molar mass	138.254 g·mol^{−1}
Density	g/mL
Boiling point	193 °C (379 °F; 466 K)

Hazards
- GHS labelling
Pictograms	(GHS07: Exclamation mark)
Signal word	Warning
Hazard statements	H315, H319, H335
Precautionary statements	P261, P264, P271, P280, P302+P352, P304+P340, P305+P351+P338, P312, P321, P332+P313, P337+P313, P362, P403+P233, P405, P501
Flash point	59 °C (138 °F; 332 K)
- Except where otherwise noted, data are given for materials in their standard state (at 25 °C [77 °F], 100 kPa). Infobox references

Cyclodecene is a cycloalkene with a ten-membered ring, with two possible geometric isomers, denoted cis-cyclodecene and trans-cyclodecene, or (Z)-cyclodecene and (E)-cyclodecene.
