= Dimethylbutadiene =

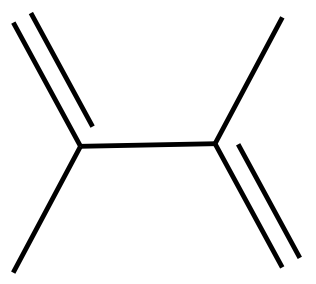

Names
- Preferred IUPAC name 2,3-Dimethylbuta-1,3-diene
- Other names Biisopropenyl; Diisopropenyl; 2,3-Dimethylbutadiene; 2,3-Dimethylenebutane

Identifiers
| CAS Number | 513-81-5 |
| 3D model (JSmol) | Interactive image |
| ChemSpider | 10124 |
| ECHA InfoCard | 100.007.430 |
| EC Number | 208-172-0 |
| PubChem CID | 10566 |
| UNII | 61TUU25HCO |
| CompTox Dashboard (EPA) | DTXSID2022046 |
- InChI: InChI=1S/C6H10/c1-5(2)6(3)4/h1,3H2,2,4H3 Key: SDJHPPZKZZWAKF-UHFFFAOYSA-N; InChI=1/C6H10/c1-5(2)6(3)4/h1,3H2,2,4H3 Key: SDJHPPZKZZWAKF-UHFFFAOYAQ
- SMILES: CC(=C)C(=C)C

Properties
| Chemical formula | C_{6}H_{10} |
| Molar mass | 82.146 g·mol^{−1} |
| Density | 0.7222g / cm^{3} |
| Melting point | −76 °C (−105 °F; 197 K) |
| Boiling point | 69 °C (156 °F; 342 K) |
| Vapor pressure | 269 mm Hg (37.7 °C) |

Hazards
- Occupational safety and health (OHS/OSH)
| Main hazards | Flammable and irritant |
- GHS labelling
| Pictograms | (GHS02: Flammable) |
| Flash point | −1 °C (30 °F; 272 K) |
- Except where otherwise noted, data are given for materials in their standard state (at 25 °C [77 °F], 100 kPa). Infobox references

Dimethylbutadiene, formally referred to as 2,3-dimethyl-1,3-butadiene, is an organic compound with the formula (CH_{3})_{2}C_{4}H_{4}. It is colorless liquid which served an important role in the early history of synthetic rubber. It is now a specialty reagent.

== Synthesis ==
Dimethylbutadiene is readily prepared by an acid catalyzed dehydration reaction of pinacol:

HO(CH_{3})_{2}C−C(CH_{3})_{2}OH → CH_{3}(CH_{2}=C−C=CH_{2})CH_{3} + 2 H_{2}O

The current industrial route involves dimerization of propene followed by dehydrogenation.

== Applications ==
In 1909, Fritz Hofmann and a team working at Bayer succeeded in polymerizing dimethylbutadiene. It was then called methyl isoprene because it has one more methyl group than isoprene. Their polymer was the first synthetic rubber. The polymer had a number of deficiencies relative to natural rubber. The Bayer synthesis of dimethylbutadiene involved the dehydration of pinacol, as described above.

== Reactions ==
Dimethylbutadiene readily undergoes Diels-Alder reactions and reacts faster than 1,3-butadiene. Its effectiveness in this reaction is attributed to the stabilization of the cis-conformation owing to the influence of the methyl groups on the C2 and C3 positions.

Diels-Alder reaction using 2,3-dimethyl-1,3-butadiene and N-ethylmaleimide
