= Bredt's rule =

Empirical observation in organic chemistry

In organic chemistry, Bredt's rule is the empirical observation that bridged molecules tend only to possess a double bond at the bridgehead in large ring systems. The rule is named after Julius Bredt, who first discussed it in 1902 and codified it in 1924.

An anti-Bredt molecule is a molecule which does not follow Bredt's rule. For example, two of the following norbornene isomers violate Bredt's rule and were long considered too unstable to make.

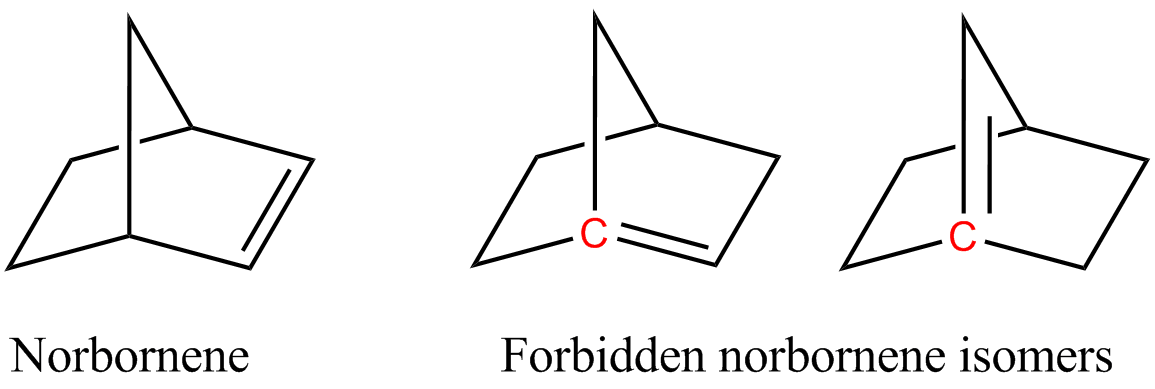
Bridgehead atoms violating Bredt's rule in red

== Causes and consequences ==
Bredt's rule results from geometric strain: a double bond at a bridgehead atom necessarily must be trans in at least one ring. For small rings (fewer than eight atoms), a trans alkene cannot be achieved without substantial angle and ring and angle strain (the p orbitals are improperly aligned for a π bond through twisting and pyramidalization). Bredt's rule also applies to carbocations and, to a lesser degree, free radicals, because these intermediates also prefer a planar geometry with 120° angles and sp^{2} hybridization. It generally does not apply to hypervalent heteroatoms, although they are commonly written with a formal double bond.

Bredt's rule can predict the viability of competing elimination reactions in a bridged system. For example, the metal alkyl complexes usually decompose quickly via beta elimination, but Bredt strain prevents tetranorbornyl complexes from doing so. Bicyclo[5.3.1]undecane-11-one-1-carboxylic acid undergoes decarboxylation on heating to 132 °C, but the similar compound bicyclo[2.2.1]heptan-7-one-1-carboxylic acid remains stable beyond 500 °C, because the decarboxylation proceeds through an anti-Bredt enol.

Bredt's rule may also prevent a molecule from resonating with certain valence bond isomers. 2-Quinuclidonium does not exhibit the usual reactivity of an amide, because the iminoether tautomer would violate the rule.

== Anti-Bredt molecules ==
There has been active research to seek anti-Bredt molecules, with success quantified in S, the non-bridgehead atom count. The above norbornene system has S = 5, and Fawcett originally postulated that stability required S ≥ 9 in bicyclic systems and S ≥ 11 in tricyclic systems. For bicyclic systems examples now indicate a limit of S ≥ 7, with several such compounds having been prepared. Bridgehead double bonds can be found in some natural products.

Anti-Bredt molecules were historically difficult to synthesize and even harder to isolate, but advances in chemical synthesis have overcome the rule. Early breakthroughs came from Wiseman, Keese, Wiberg, and others, validating anti-Bredt olefin intermediates through trapping reactions. Mehta (2002) reported an approach to anti-Bredt alkenes for ring-closing metathesis and Khan (2015) generated transient anti-bredt enones and trapped them with methanol or water.

Following these studies, in 2024, Houk and Garg discovered a solution to synthesizing and using anti-Bredt olefins in cycloadditions. Later computational studies showed the energetics and stereoelectronic requirements for how anti-Bredt olefins can be generated, despite their high strain. The discovery of a palladium-catalyzed annulation of an anti-Bredt olefin was recently reported.

== See also ==
- trans-Cyclooctene — smallest trans cycloalkene that can be readily isolated
