= Pyramidal alkene =

Pyramidal alkenes are alkenes in which the two carbon atoms making up the double bond are not coplanar with their four substituents. This deformation results from geometric constraints. Pyramidal alkenes are of interest because much can be learned from them about the nature of chemical bonding.

== Energetics ==
Twisting to a 90° dihedral angle between two of the groups on the carbons requires less energy than the strength of a pi bond, and the bond still holds. The carbons of the double bond become pyramidal, which allows preserving some p orbital alignment—and hence pi bonding. The other two attached groups remain at a larger dihedral angle. This contradicts a common textbook assertion that the two carbons retain their planar nature when twisting, in which case the p orbitals would rotate enough away from each other to be unable to sustain a pi bond. In a 90°-twisted alkene, the p orbitals are only misaligned by 42° and the strain energy is only around 40 kcal/mol. In contrast, a fully broken pi bond has an energetic cost of around 65 kcal/mol.

== Examples ==
In cycloheptene (1.1) the cis isomer is an ordinary unstrained molecule, but the heptane ring is too small to accommodate a trans-configured alkene group resulting in strain and twisting of the double bond. The p-orbital misalignment is minimized by a degree of pyramidalization. In the related anti-Bredt molecules, it is not pyramidalization but twisting that dominates.

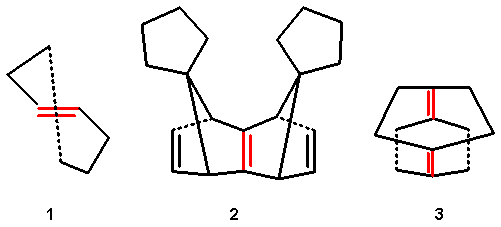
Figure 1. Pyramidal alkenes

Pyramidalized cage alkenes also exist where symmetrical bending of the substituents predominates without p-orbital misalignment.

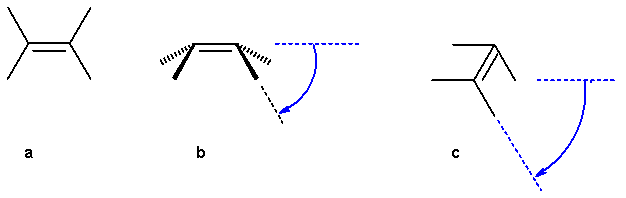
Figure 2. Angle definitions

The pyramidalization angle φ (b) is defined as the angle between the plane defined by one of the doubly bonded carbons and its two substituents and the extension of the double bond and is calculated as:
$$\cos \varphi =  - \frac {\cos(\angle \mathrm{RCC})} {\cos(\frac{1}{2}\angle \mathrm{RCR})}$$

the butterfly bending angle or folding angle ψ (c) is defined as the angle between two planes and can be obtained by averaging the two torsional angles R_{1}C=CR_{3} and R_{2}C=CR_{4}.

In alkenes 1.2 and 1.3 these angles are determined with X-ray crystallography as respectively 32.4°/22.7° and 27.3°/35.6°. Although stable, these alkenes are very reactive compared to ordinary alkenes. They are liable to dimerization creating cyclobutane rings, or react with oxygen to epoxides.

The compound tetradehydrodianthracene, also with a 35° pyramidalization angle, is synthesized in a photochemical cycloaddition of bromoanthracene followed by elimination of hydrogen bromide.

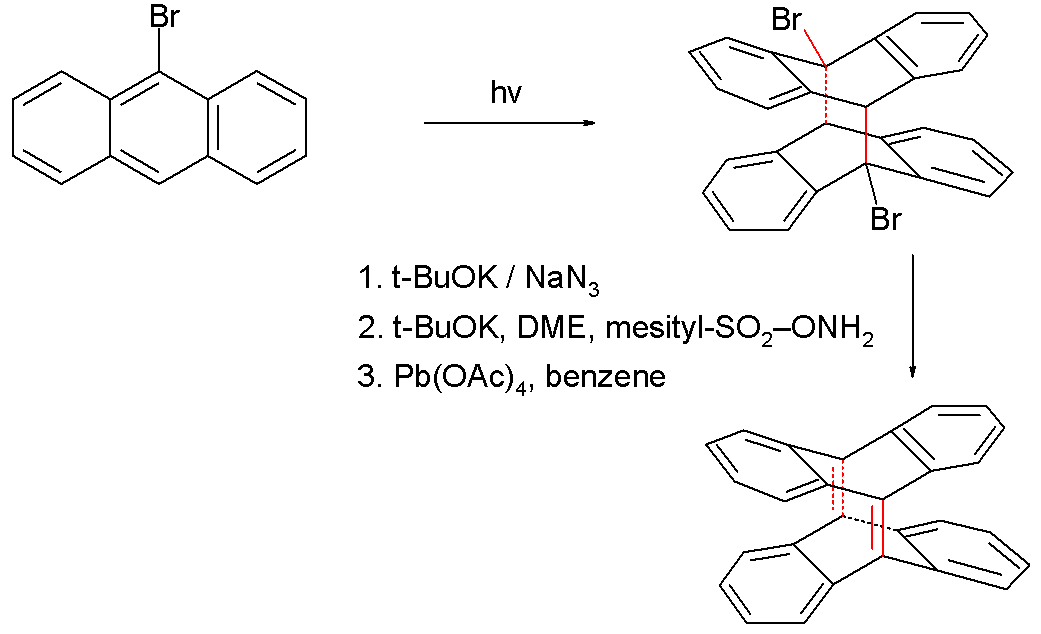
Figure 3. Tetradehydrodianthracene synthesis

This compound is very reactive in Diels–Alder reactions due to through-space interactions between the two alkene groups. This enhanced reactivity enabled in turn the synthesis of the first-ever Möbius aromat.

In one study, the strained alkene 4.4 was synthesized with the highest pyramidalizion angles yet, 33.5° and 34.3°. This compound is the double Diels–Alder adduct of the diiodocyclophane 4.1 and anthracene 4.3 by reaction in presence of potassium tert-butoxide in refluxing dibutyl ether through a diaryne intermediate 4.2. This is a stable compound but will slowly react with oxygen to an epoxide when left standing as a chloroform solution.

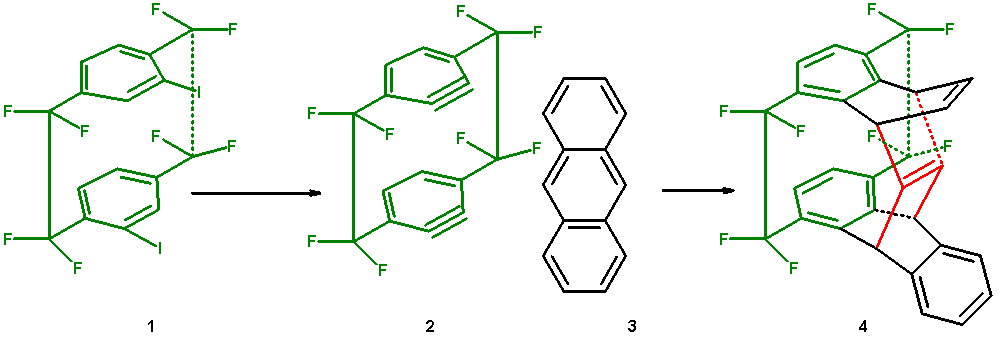
Figure 4. Cyclophane anthracene adduct

In one study, isolation of a pyramidal alkene is not even possible by matrix isolation at extremely low temperatures unless stabilized by metal coordination:

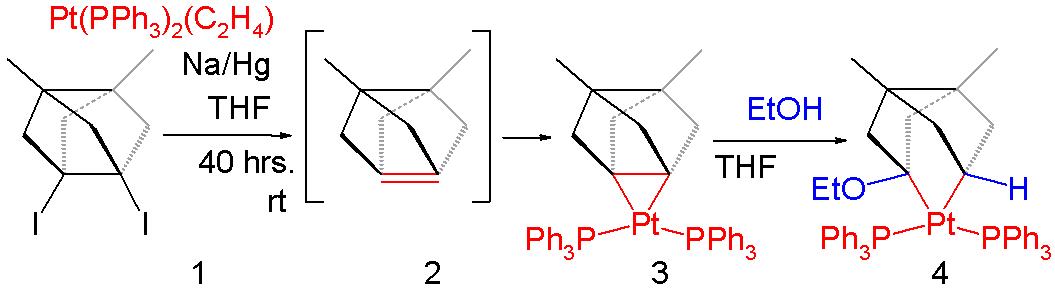
Figure 5. (Ph_{3}P)_{2}Pt complex of 3,7-dimethyltricyclo[3.3.0.0^{3,7}]oct-1(5)-ene

A reaction of the diiodide 5.1 in Figure 5 with sodium amalgam in the presence of ethylenebis(triphenylphosphine)platinum(0) does not give the intermediate alkene 5.2 but the platinum stabilized 5.3. The sigma bond in this compound is destroyed in reaction with ethanol.

Isobenzvalene (tricyclo[3.1.0.0^{2,6}]hex-1(6)-ene), an isomer of benzene, has been synthesized and trapped by a Diels–Alder reaction with anthracene.

Dodecahedrane dehydrogenates to C20 fullerene, as well as a variety of partially-unsaturated clusters. The latter are thermodynamically quite stable despite extremely pyramidalized alkenes (φ ≈ 40°).

In 2024, Neil Garg and Kendall Houk reported a general way to make pyramidalized anti-Bredt olefins, violating Bredt's Rule, and later described chemistry of cubene and quadricyclene. They introduced the term "hyperpyramidalized" to describe the severe pyramidalization of cubene and quadricyclene carbons and showed correlations between pyramidalization and non-integer bond orders.
