= 5-Decyne =

Names
- Preferred IUPAC name Dec-5-yne
- Other names: Dibutylethyne; Dibutylacetylene; Dec-5-yne; 1,2-Dibutylacetylene

Identifiers
CAS Number	1942-46-7
3D model (JSmol)	Interactive image
ChemSpider	15222
ECHA InfoCard	100.204.680
MeSH	C028997
PubChem CID	16030
UNII	88G1AII0AH
CompTox Dashboard (EPA)	DTXSID70173038
- InChI: InChI=1S/C10H18/c1-3-5-7-9-10-8-6-4-2/h3-8H2,1-2H3 Key: JWBQJUFCNOLNNC-UHFFFAOYSA-N
- SMILES: CCCCC#CCCCC

Properties
Chemical formula	C_{10}H_{18}
Molar mass	138.254 g·mol^{−1}
Density	0.766 g/ml
Boiling point	177 °C (351 °F; 450 K)
- Except where otherwise noted, data are given for materials in their standard state (at 25 °C [77 °F], 100 kPa). Infobox references

5-Decyne, also known as dibutylethyne, is a type of alkyne with a triple bond at its fifth carbon (the '5-' indicates the location of the triple bond in the chain). Its formula is C_{10}H_{18}. Its density at 25 °C and otherwise standard conditions is 0.766 g/ml. The boiling point is 177 °C. The average molar mass is 138.25 g/mol.

5-Decyne forms a group of symmetric alkynes with 4-octyne, 3-hexyne, and 2-butyne.

== See also ==
- 1-Decyne
