= 2-Octyne =

Names
- Preferred IUPAC name Oct-2-yne
- Other names Amylmethylacetylene; Methylpentylacetylene

Identifiers
CAS Number	2809-67-8
3D model (JSmol)	Interactive image
ChemSpider	16791
ECHA InfoCard	100.018.685
EC Number	220-553-3
PubChem CID	17769
UNII	YP28K987X2
CompTox Dashboard (EPA)	DTXSID10182366
- InChI: InChI=1S/C8H14/c1-3-5-7-8-6-4-2/h3,5,7-8H2,1-2H3 Key: QCQALVMFTWRCFI-UHFFFAOYSA-N; InChI=1/C8H14/c1-3-5-7-8-6-4-2/h3,5,7-8H2,1-2H3 Key: QCQALVMFTWRCFI-UHFFFAOYAD
- SMILES: CC#CCCCCC

Properties
Chemical formula	C_{8}H_{14}
Molar mass	110.200 g·mol^{−1}
Density	0.759 g/mL
Boiling point	137 °C (279 °F; 410 K)
- Except where otherwise noted, data are given for materials in their standard state (at 25 °C [77 °F], 100 kPa). Infobox references

2-Octyne, also known as methylpentylethyne and oct-2-yne, is a type of alkyne with a triple bond at its second carbon (the '2-' indicates the location of the triple bond in the chain). Its formula is C_{8}H_{14}. Its density at 25 °C and otherwise stable conditions is 0.759 g/ml. The boiling point is 137 °C. The average molar mass is 110.20 g/mol.

It is formed by isomerization of 1-octyne catalyzed by a Yb^{II} complex.
