= 1-Decyne =

- $\scriptstyle\ce{CH3-CH2-CH2-CH2-CH2-CH2-CH2-CH2-C#CH}$

Names
- Preferred IUPAC name Dec-1-yne
- Other names 1-Decyne

Identifiers
CAS Number	764-93-2
3D model (JSmol)	Interactive image
ChEBI	CHEBI:87322
ChemSpider	12456
ECHA InfoCard	100.011.029
EC Number	212-132-8
PubChem CID	12997
UNII	ULR28GD98Q
CompTox Dashboard (EPA)	DTXSID60870766
- InChI: InChI=1S/C10H18/c1-3-5-7-9-10-8-6-4-2/h1H,4-10H2,2H3 Key: ILLHQJIJCRNRCJ-UHFFFAOYSA-N; InChI=1/C10H18/c1-3-5-7-9-10-8-6-4-2/h1H,4-10H2,2H3 Key: ILLHQJIJCRNRCJ-UHFFFAOYAE
- SMILES: C(#C)CCCCCCCC

Properties
Chemical formula	C_{10}H_{18}
Molar mass	138.254 g·mol^{−1}
Appearance	Colorless liquid
Density	0.767 g/cm^{3}
Melting point	−44 °C (−47 °F; 229 K)
Boiling point	174 °C (345 °F; 447 K)
Refractive index (n_{D})	1.426–1.428

Hazards
- GHS labelling
Pictograms	(GHS02: Flammable) (GHS05: Corrosive) (GHS07: Exclamation mark) (GHS09: Environmental hazard)
Signal word	Danger
Hazard statements	H226, H315, H318, H335, H410
Precautionary statements	P210, P233, P240, P241, P242, P243, P261, P264, P271, P273, P280, P302+P352, P303+P361+P353, P304+P340, P305+P351+P338, P310, P312, P321, P332+P313, P362, P370+P378, P391, P403+P233, P403+P235, P405, P501
Flash point	48 °C (118 °F; 321 K)
Safety data sheet (SDS)	External MSDS

Related compounds
Related Alkynes	Octyne; Nonyne; Undecyne; Dodecyne
Related compounds	Decane; Decanol; Decene
- Except where otherwise noted, data are given for materials in their standard state (at 25 °C [77 °F], 100 kPa). verify (what is ?) Infobox references

1-Decyne is the organic compound with the formula C_{8}H_{17}C≡CH. It is a terminal alkyne. A colorless liquid, 1-decyne is used as a model substrate when evaluating methodology in organic synthesis. It participates in a number of classical reactions including Suzuki-Miyaura couplings, Sonogashira couplings, Huisgen cycloadditions, and borylations.

Under the catalysis of platinum, it reacts with hydrogen to produce decane.

== See also ==
- 5-Decyne
