= Cis-Cyclooctene =

cis-Cyclooctene

Names
- Preferred IUPAC name (Z)-Cyclooctene
- Other names cis-Cyclooctene

Identifiers
CAS Number	931-87-3
3D model (JSmol)	Interactive image
ChEBI	CHEBI:229204
ChemSpider	553642
ECHA InfoCard	100.012.040
EC Number	213-243-4
PubChem CID	638079
UNII	AE340T3540
CompTox Dashboard (EPA)	DTXSID20883615
- InChI: InChI=1S/C8H14/c1-2-4-6-8-7-5-3-1/h1-2H,3-8H2/b2-1- Key: URYYVOIYTNXXBN-UPHRSURJSA-N; InChI=1/C8H14/c1-2-4-6-8-7-5-3-1/h1-2H,3-8H2/b2-1- Key: URYYVOIYTNXXBN-UPHRSURJBT
- SMILES: C\1=C\CCCCCC/1

Properties
Chemical formula	C_{8}H_{14}
Molar mass	110.200 g·mol^{−1}
Density	0.846 g/mL
Melting point	−16 °C (3 °F; 257 K)
Boiling point	145 to 146 °C (293 to 295 °F; 418 to 419 K)

Hazards
- GHS labelling
Pictograms	(GHS02: Flammable) (GHS08: Health hazard)
Signal word	Danger
Hazard statements	H226, H304
Precautionary statements	P210, P233, P240, P241, P242, P243, P280, P301+P310, P303+P361+P353, P331, P370+P378, P403+P235, P405, P501
- Except where otherwise noted, data are given for materials in their standard state (at 25 °C [77 °F], 100 kPa). Infobox references

cis-Cyclooctene is a cycloalkene with the formula (CH_{2})_{6}(CH)_{2}. It is a colorless liquid that is used industrially to produce a polymer. It is also a ligand in organometallic chemistry.

Cyclooctene is the smallest cycloalkene that can be isolated as both the cis- and trans-isomer. cis-Cyclooctene is shaped like the 8-carbon equivalent chair conformation of cyclohexane.

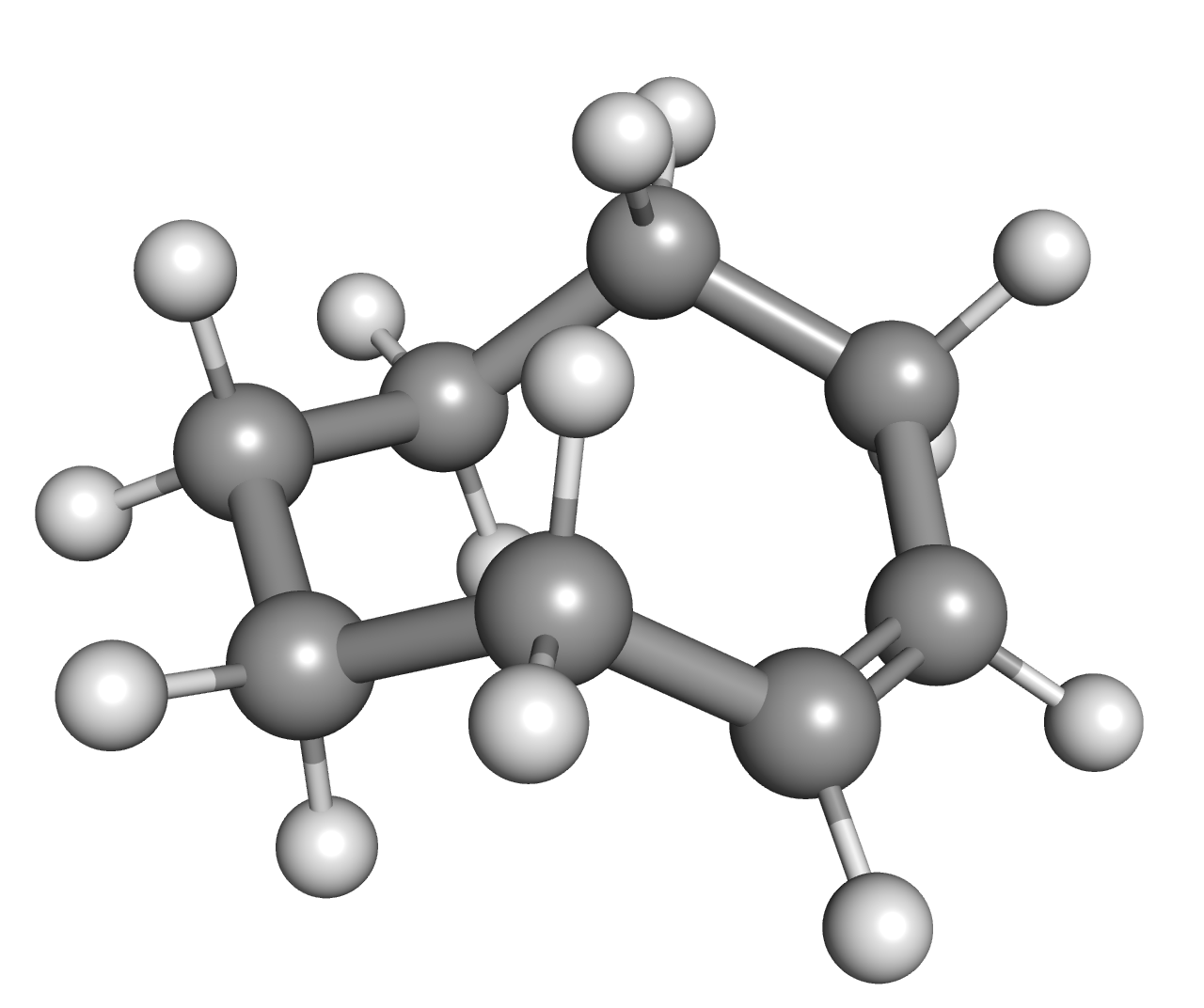
cis-Cyclooctene in chair conformation

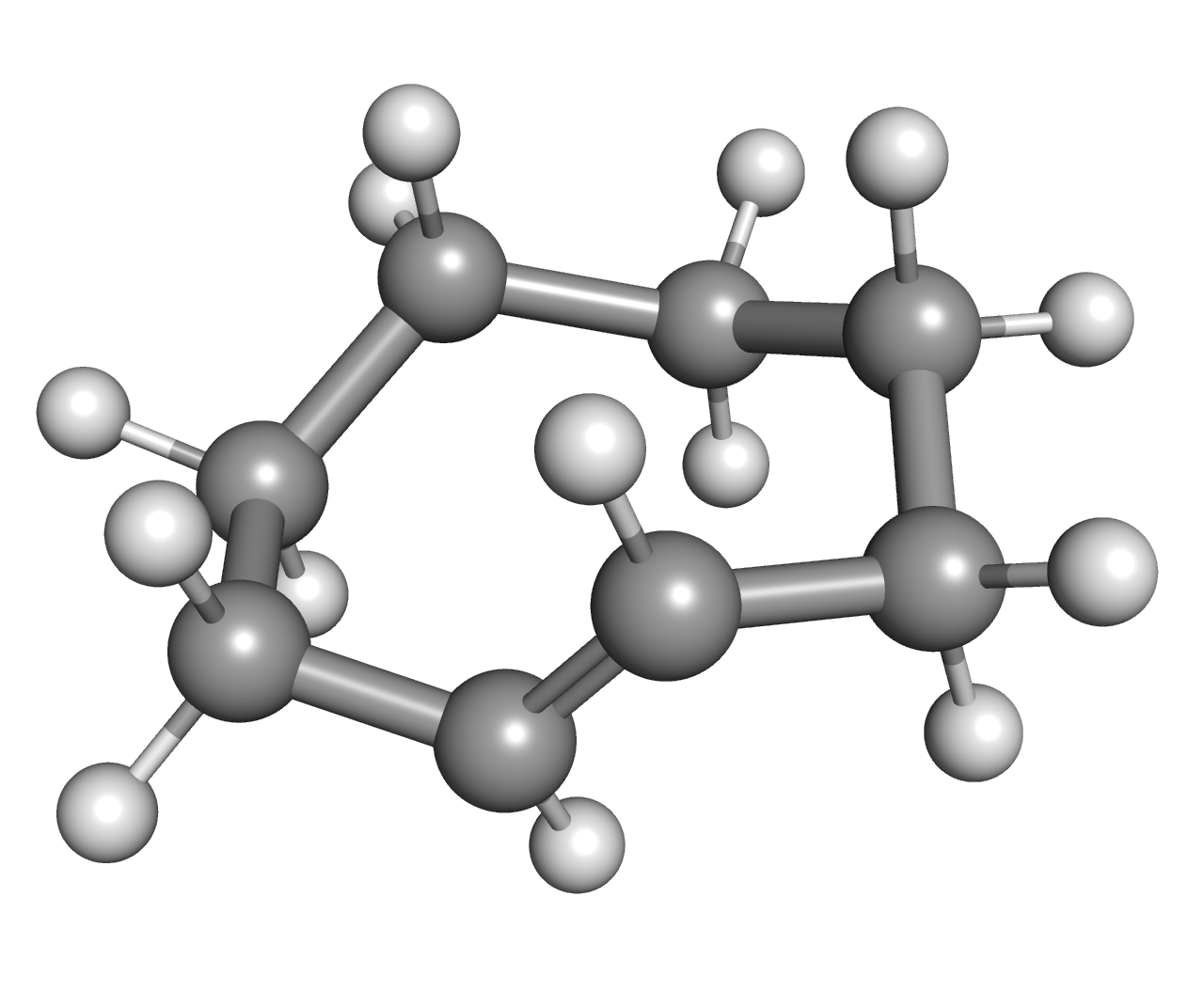
(R_{p})-trans-Cyclooctene in crown conformation

== Uses and reactions ==
Cyclooctene undergoes ring-opening metathesis polymerization to give polyoctenamers, which are marketed under the name Vestenamer.

cis-Cyclooctene (COE) is a substrate known for quite selectively forming the epoxide, as compared to other cycloalkenes, e.g. cyclohexene. Low amounts of radical by-products are found only. This behaviour is attributed to the difficulty of functionalizing allylic CH centers, which almost orthogonal allylic C-H bonds. Therefore, if radicals are around, they tend to form epoxide via an addition-elimination mechanism.

It is used as an easily displaced ligand in organometallic chemistry, e.g. chlorobis(cyclooctene)rhodium dimer and chlorobis(cyclooctene)iridium dimer.
