= 4-Octyne =

Names
- Preferred IUPAC name Oct-4-yne
- Other names: Dipropylacetylene; 1,2-Dipropylacetylene; Dipropylethyne

Identifiers
| CAS Number | 1942-45-6 |
| 3D model (JSmol) | Interactive image |
| ChemSpider | 15221 |
| ECHA InfoCard | 100.016.119 |
| EC Number | 217-730-2 |
| PubChem CID | 16029 |
| UNII | IJI0Q2V1Z6 |
| CompTox Dashboard (EPA) | DTXSID6074338 |
- InChI: InChI=1S/C8H14/c1-3-5-7-8-6-4-2/h3-6H2,1-2H3 Key: GZTNBKQTTZSQNS-UHFFFAOYSA-N; InChI=1/C8H14/c1-3-5-7-8-6-4-2/h3-6H2,1-2H3 Key: GZTNBKQTTZSQNS-UHFFFAOYAB
- SMILES: CCCC#CCCC

Properties
| Chemical formula | C_{8}H_{14} |
| Molar mass | 110.200 g·mol^{−1} |
| Appearance | colorless liquid |
| Density | 0.751 g/mL |
| Melting point | −103 °C (−153 °F; 170 K) |
| Boiling point | 131–132 °C (268–270 °F; 404–405 K) |
- Except where otherwise noted, data are given for materials in their standard state (at 25 °C [77 °F], 100 kPa). Infobox references

4-Octyne, also known as dipropylethyne, is a type of alkyne with a triple bond at its fourth carbon (the '4-' indicates the location of the triple bond in the chain). Its formula is C_{8}H_{14}.

4-Octyne forms with 5-decyne, 3-hexyne, and 2-butyne a group of symmetric alkynes.

== Preparation ==
One method for synthesizing 4-octyne is the reaction between acetylene and two equivalents of 1-bromopropane. Acetylene is first deprotonated by a base to give an anion, which then undergoes nucleophilic substitution with the bromopropane. The resulting alkyne is again deprotonated and reacts similarly with a second molecule of bromopropane. This reaction can be carried out in liquid ammonia at −70 °C with sodium amide as the base.

Another synthetic route is the elimination reaction of 4,5-dibromooctane, which can be done in similar conditions.

== Properties ==
4-octyne is a colorless liquid at room temperature. Its density at 25 °C and otherwise stable conditions is 0.751 g/mL. The boiling point is 131–132 °C. The average molar mass is 110.20 g/mol.
