= 1-Hexyne =

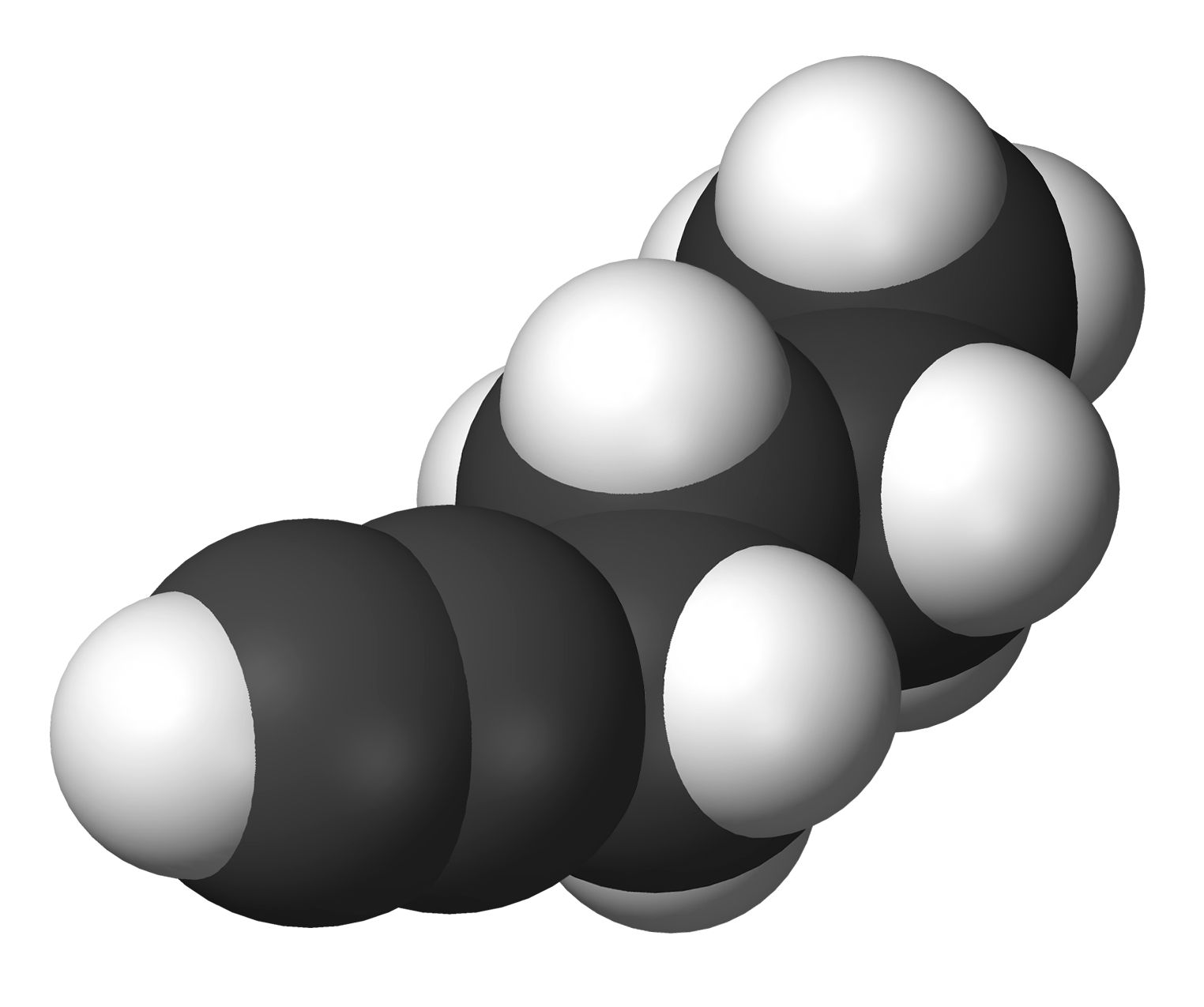

Names
- Preferred IUPAC name Hex-1-yne
- Other names n-Butylacetylene

Identifiers
CAS Number	693-02-7
3D model (JSmol)	Interactive image
ChEBI	CHEBI:176793
ChemSpider	12209
ECHA InfoCard	100.010.671
EC Number	211-736-9
PubChem CID	12732
UNII	5FZF2F38F5
CompTox Dashboard (EPA)	DTXSID30870753
- InChI: InChI=1S/C6H10/c1-3-5-6-4-2/h1H,4-6H2,2H3 Key: CGHIBGNXEGJPQZ-UHFFFAOYSA-N
- SMILES: CCCCC#C

Properties
Chemical formula	C_{6}H_{10}
Molar mass	82.146 g·mol^{−1}
Appearance	colorless liquid (impure samples can appear yellowish)
Density	0.72 g/cm^{3}
Melting point	−132 °C (−206 °F; 141 K)
Boiling point	71 to 72 °C (160 to 162 °F; 344 to 345 K)
Solubility in water	0.36 g/L

Hazards
- Occupational safety and health (OHS/OSH)
Main hazards	Irritant, Flammable, Health Hazard
- GHS labelling
Pictograms	(GHS02: Flammable) (GHS07: Exclamation mark) (GHS08: Health hazard)
Signal word	Danger
Hazard statements	H225, H304, H315, H319, H335
Precautionary statements	P210, P233, P240, P241, P242, P243, P261, P264, P271, P280, P301+P310, P302+P352, P303+P361+P353, P304+P340, P305+P351+P338, P312, P321, P331, P332+P313, P337+P313, P362, P370+P378, P403+P233, P403+P235, P405, P501
Flash point	−20 °C (−4 °F; 253 K)
- Except where otherwise noted, data are given for materials in their standard state (at 25 °C [77 °F], 100 kPa). verify (what is ?) Infobox references

1-Hexyne is a hydrocarbon consisting of a straight six-carbon chain having a terminal alkyne. Its molecular formula is HC_{2}C_{4}H_{9}. A colorless liquid, it is one of three isomers of hexyne. It is used as a reagent in organic synthesis.

== Synthesis and reactions ==
1-Hexyne can be prepared by the reaction of monosodium acetylide with butyl bromide:

NaC_{2}H + BrC_{4}H_{9} → HC_{2}C_{4}H_{9} + NaBr

Its reactivity illustrates the behavior of terminal alkylacetylenes. The hexyl derivative is common test substrate because it is conveniently volatile. It undergoes deprotonation at C-3 and C-1 with butyl lithium:

HC_{2}C_{4}H_{9} + 2 BuLi → LiC_{2}CH(Li)C_{3}H_{7} + 2 BuH

This reaction allows alkylation at the 3-position.

Catechol borane adds to 1-hexyne to give the 1-hexenyl borane.

1-Hexyne reacts with diethyl fumarate to produce n-hexylsuccinic acid.

== See also ==
- 2-Hexyne
- 3-Hexyne
