= 3-Hexyne =

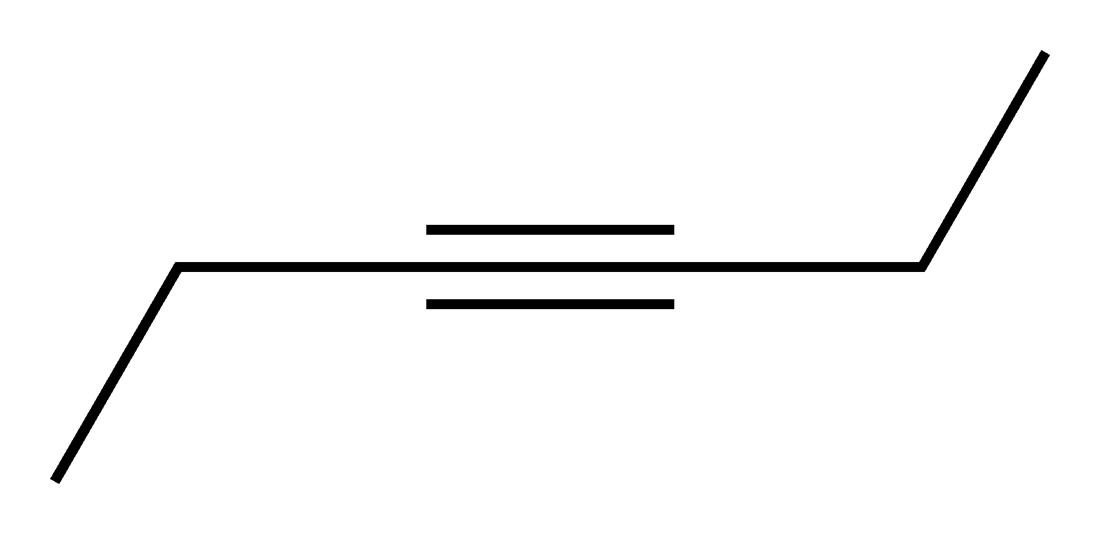
- Structural formula

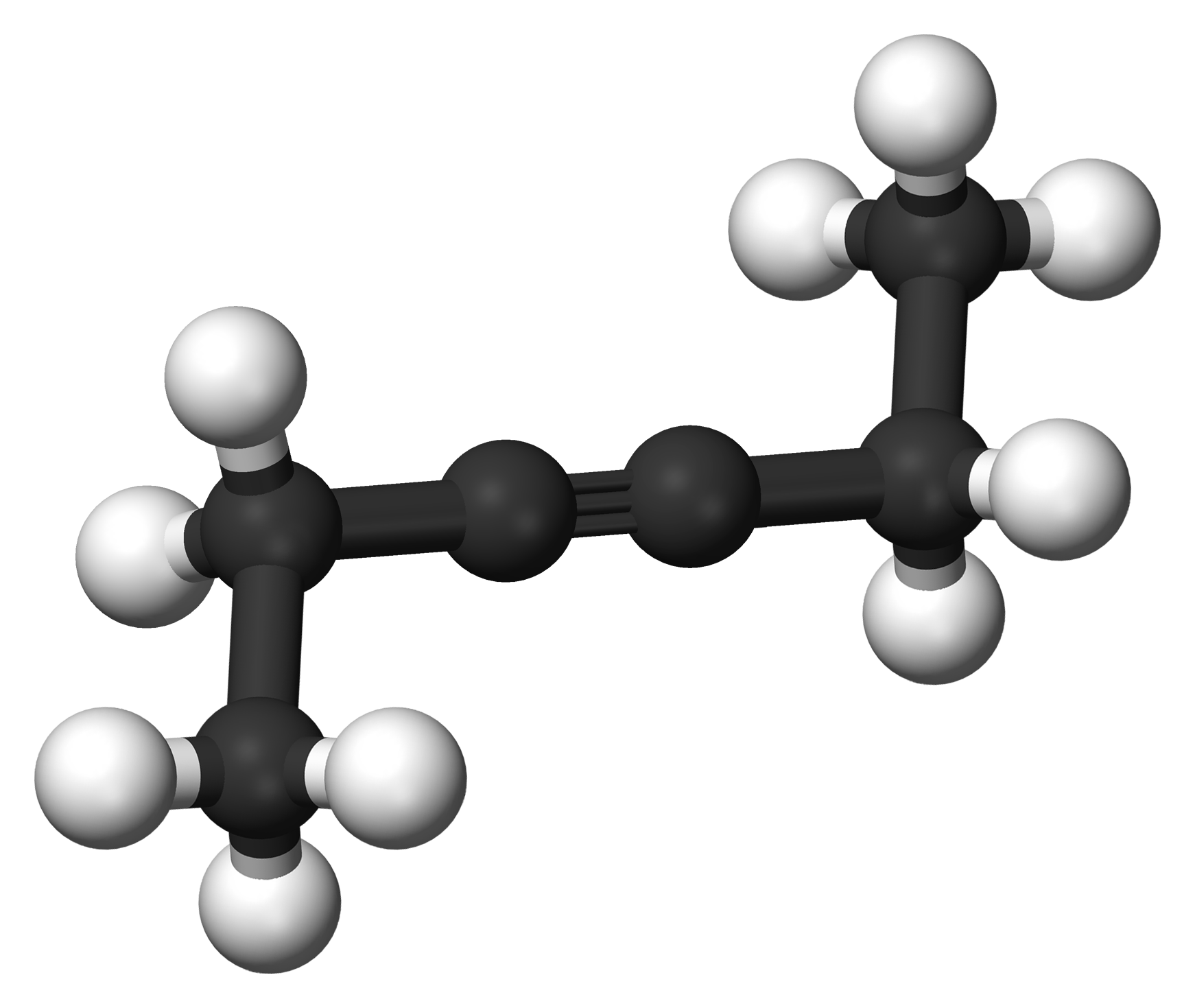
- Ball-and-stick model

Names
- Preferred IUPAC name Hex-3-yne
- Other names Diethylacetylene

Identifiers
CAS Number	928-49-4
3D model (JSmol)	Interactive image; Interactive image
ChemSpider	12979
ECHA InfoCard	100.011.977
EC Number	213-173-4
PubChem CID	13568
UNII	9GTQ990Q4K
CompTox Dashboard (EPA)	DTXSID30239144
- InChI: InChI=1S/C6H10/c1-3-5-6-4-2/h3-4H2,1-2H3 Key: DQQNMIPXXNPGCV-UHFFFAOYSA-N; InChI=1/C6H10/c1-3-5-6-4-2/h3-4H2,1-2H3 Key: DQQNMIPXXNPGCV-UHFFFAOYAF
- SMILES: C(#CCC)CC; CCC#CCC

Properties
Chemical formula	C_{6}H_{10}
Molar mass	82.146 g·mol^{−1}
Appearance	Colorless liquid
Density	0.723 g/cm^{3}
Melting point	−105 °C (−157 °F; 168 K)
Boiling point	81 to 82 °C (178 to 180 °F; 354 to 355 K)
Solubility in water	low

Hazards
- GHS labelling
Pictograms	(GHS02: Flammable) (GHS07: Exclamation mark) (GHS08: Health hazard)
Signal word	Danger
Hazard statements	H225, H304, H315, H319, H335
Precautionary statements	P210, P233, P240, P241, P242, P243, P261, P264, P271, P280, P301+P310, P302+P352, P303+P361+P353, P304+P340, P305+P351+P338, P312, P321, P331, P332+P313, P337+P313, P362, P370+P378, P403+P233, P403+P235, P405, P501
Flash point	−14 °C (7 °F; 259 K)
- Except where otherwise noted, data are given for materials in their standard state (at 25 °C [77 °F], 100 kPa). verify (what is ?) Infobox references

3-Hexyne is the organic compound with the formula C_{2}H_{5}CCC_{2}H_{5}. This colorless liquid is one of three isomeric hexynes. 3-Hexyne forms with 5-decyne, 4-octyne, and 2-butyne a series of symmetric alkynes. It is a reagent in organometallic chemistry.

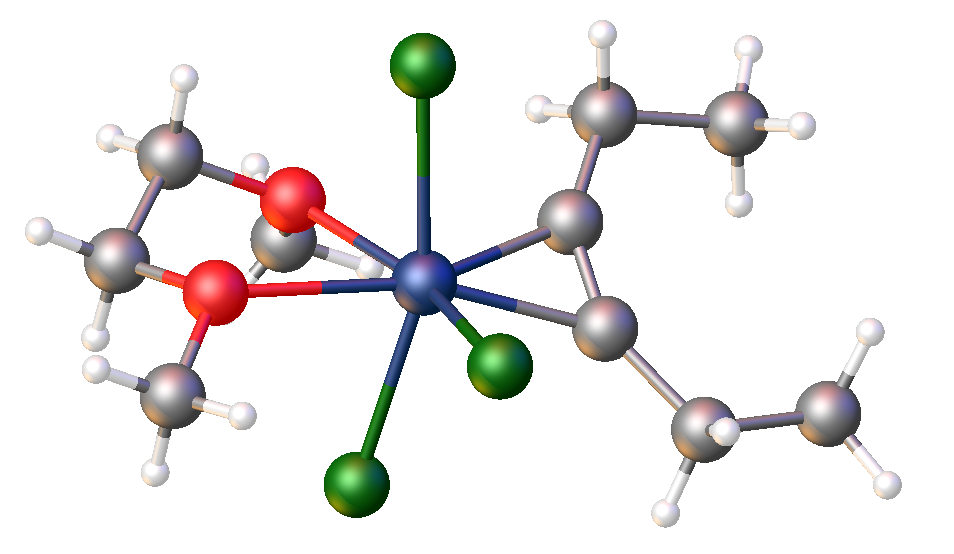
Structure of the coordination complex NbCl_{3}(dimethoxyethane)(3-hexyne).
