= Trans-Cyclooctene =

trans-Cyclooctene
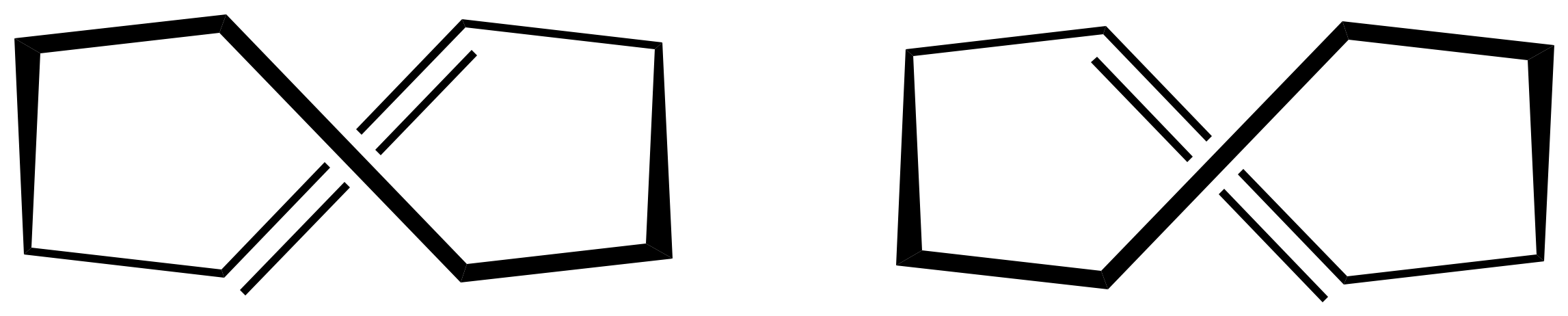

Names
- Preferred IUPAC name (E)-Cyclooctene
- Other names trans-Cyclooctene

Identifiers
CAS Number	931-89-5
3D model (JSmol)	Interactive image
ChEBI	CHEBI:73156
ChemSpider	10265272
EC Number	213-245-5
PubChem CID	5463599
CompTox Dashboard (EPA)	DTXSID101316275
- InChI: InChI=1S/C8H14/c1-2-4-6-8-7-5-3-1/h1-2H,3-8H2/b2-1+ Key: URYYVOIYTNXXBN-OWOJBTEDSA-N
- SMILES: C1CCC/C=C/CC1

Properties
Chemical formula	C_{8}H_{14}
Molar mass	110.200 g·mol^{−1}
Appearance	colorless liquid
Density	0.848 g/mL
Melting point	−59 °C (−74 °F; 214 K)
Boiling point	143 °C (1 atm); 68-72 °C (100 torr)

Hazards
- GHS labelling
Pictograms	(GHS02: Flammable) (GHS08: Health hazard)
Signal word	Danger
- Except where otherwise noted, data are given for materials in their standard state (at 25 °C [77 °F], 100 kPa). Infobox references

trans-Cyclooctene is a cyclic hydrocarbon with the formula [–(CH_{2})_{6}CH=CH–], where the two C–C single bonds adjacent to the double bond are on opposite sides of the latter's plane. It is a colorless liquid with a disagreeable odor.

Cyclooctene is notable as the smallest cycloalkene that is readily isolated as its trans-isomer. The cis-isomer is much more stable; the ring-strain energies being 16.7 and 7.4 kcal/mol, respectively.

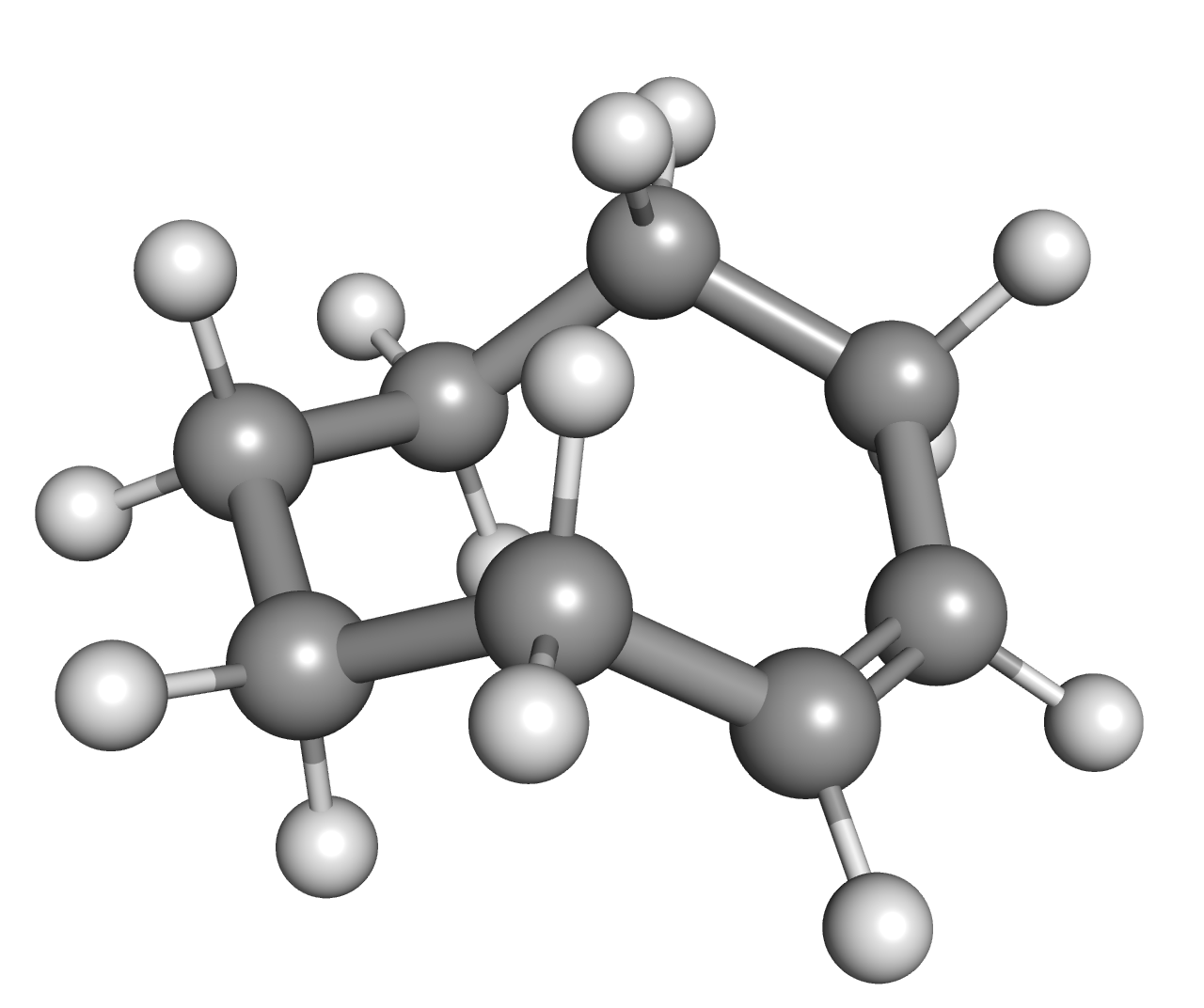
cis-Cyclooctene in chair conformation

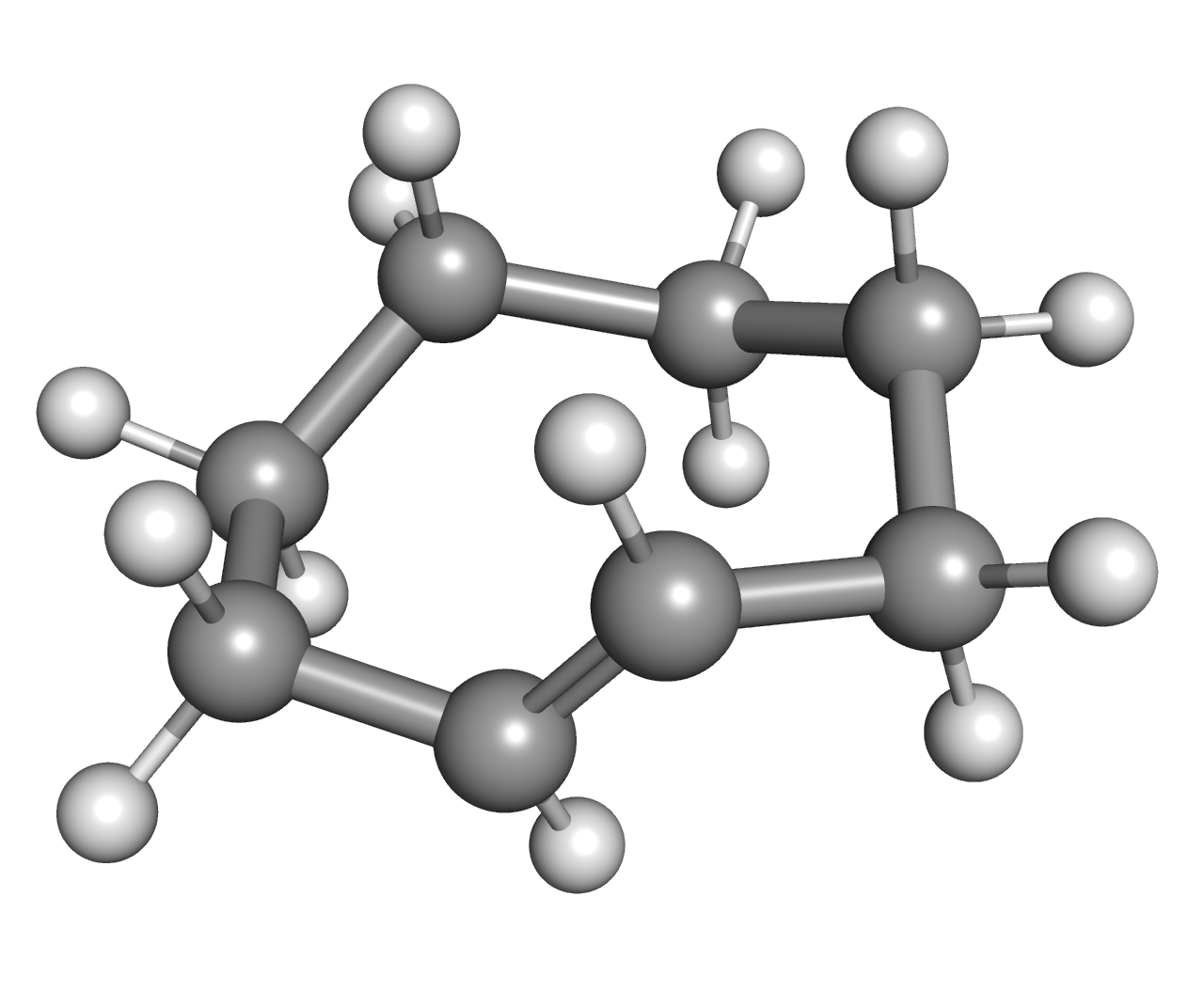
(R_{p})-trans-Cyclooctene in crown conformation

A planar arrangement of the ring carbons would be too strained, and therefore the stable conformations of the trans form have a bent (non-planar) ring. Computations indicate that the most stable "crown" conformation has the carbon atoms alternately above and below the plane of the ring. A "half-chair" conformation, with about 6 kcal/mol higher energy, has carbons 2,3,5,6, and 8 on the same side of the plane of carbons 1,4, and 7.

All conformations of trans-cyclooctene are chiral (specifically, what some call planar-chiral) and the enantiomers can be separated. In theory, conversion of between the enantiomers can be done, without breaking any bonds, by twisting the whole –CH=CH– group, rigidly, by 180 degrees. However, that entails passing one of its hydrogens through the crowded ring.

== Preparation ==
trans-Cyclooctene was first synthesized on a preparatory scale by Arthur C. Cope with a Hofmann elimination reaction of N,N,N-trimethylcyclooctylammonium iodide. The reaction gives a mixture of cis and trans isomers, and the trans isomer is selectively trapped as a complex with silver nitrate.

Other methods exist where the trans isomer is synthesized from the cis isomer in several synthetic steps. For instance, it can be prepared in almost 100% yield by converting the cis isomer to 1,2-epoxycyclooctane ("cyclooctene oxide") followed by reactions with lithium diphenylphosphide (LiPPh_{2}) and with methyl iodide CH_{3}I. (Similar procedures can give cis,trans isomers of 1,4-cyclooctadiene and 1,5-cyclooctadiene).

In addition, a photochemical method exists for the direct cis–trans isomerisation. Although this equilibrium strongly favours the more stable cis form, the reaction can be driven towards the trans form by trapping with silver ions.

== Reactions ==
Because of the higher internal strain on the double bond, the trans isomer is more reactive than the cis isomer and of typical unsaturated hydrocarbons. For instance, its double bond will rapidly add tetrazine and its derivatives. The compound also readily polymerizes with a ruthenium-based initiator.
