= Cycloalkane =

Saturated alicyclic hydrocarbon

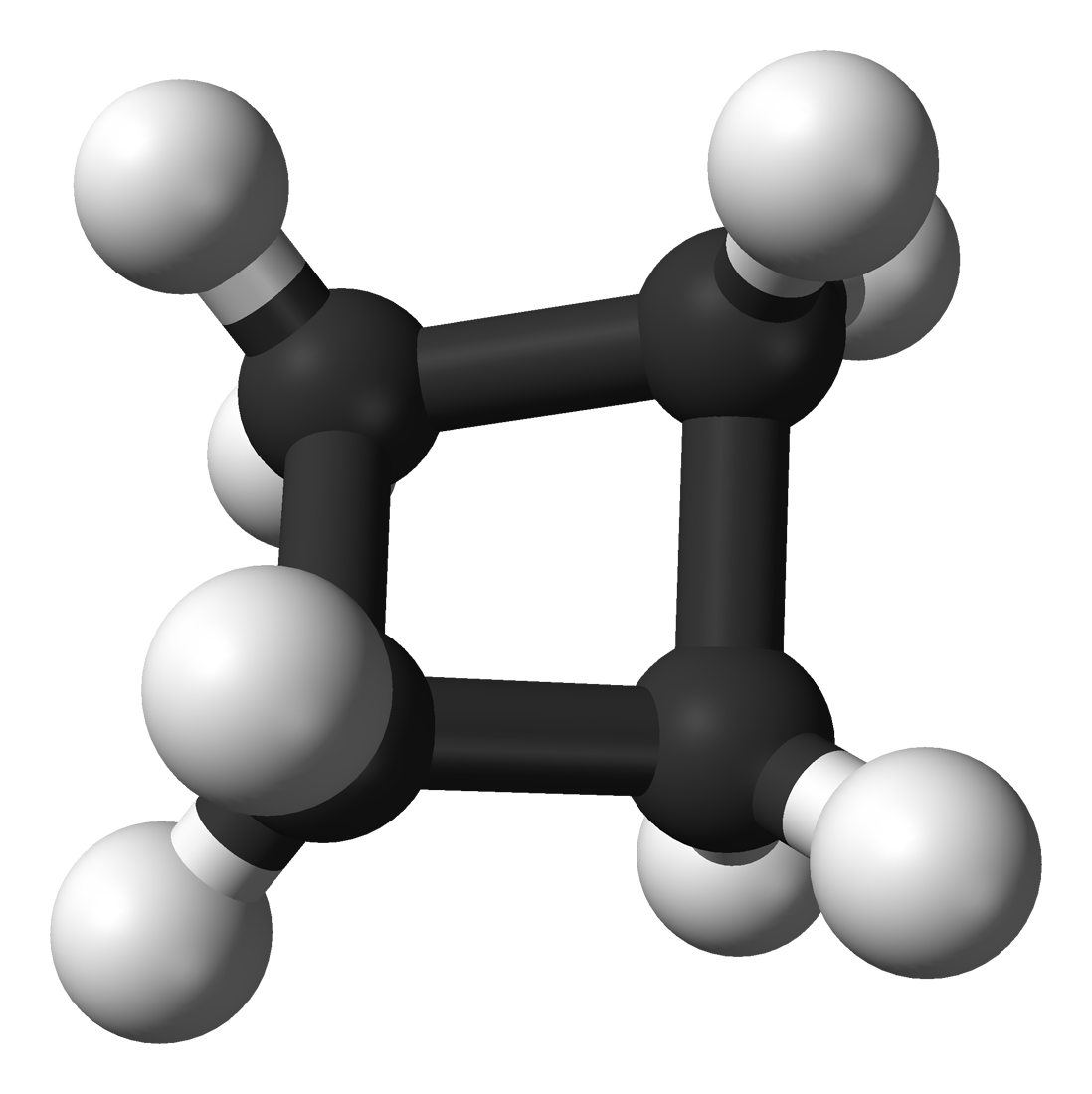
Ball-and-stick model of cyclobutane

In organic chemistry, the cycloalkanes (also called naphthenes, but distinct from naphthalene) are the monocyclic saturated hydrocarbons. In other words, a cycloalkane consists only of hydrogen and carbon atoms arranged in a structure containing a single ring (possibly with side chains), and all of the carbon-carbon bonds are single. The larger cycloalkanes, with more than 20 carbon atoms are typically called cycloparaffins. All cycloalkanes are isomers of alkenes.

The cycloalkanes without side chains (also known as monocycloalkanes) are classified as small (cyclopropane and cyclobutane), common (cyclopentane, cyclohexane, and cycloheptane), medium (cyclooctane through cyclotridecane), and large (all the rest).

Besides this standard definition by the International Union of Pure and Applied Chemistry (IUPAC), in some authors' usage the term cycloalkane includes also those saturated hydrocarbons that are polycyclic. In any case, the general form of the chemical formula for cycloalkanes is C_{n}H_{2(n+1−r)}, where n is the number of carbon atoms and r is the number of rings. The simpler form for cycloalkanes with only one ring is C_{n}H_{2n}.

== Examples ==
Cyclopropane

Cyclobutane

Cyclopentane

Cyclohexane

Cycloheptane

Cyclooctane

== Nomenclature ==
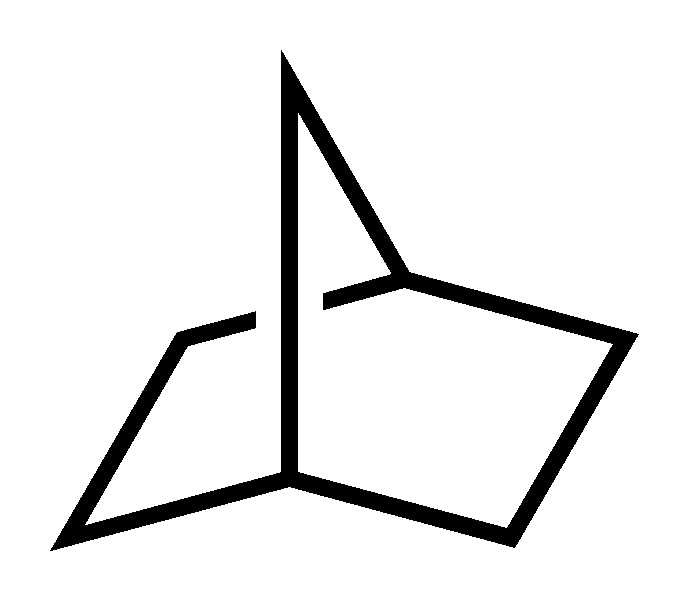
Norbornane (also called bicyclo[2.2.1]heptane)

Unsubstituted cycloalkanes that contain a single ring in their molecular structure are typically named by adding the prefix "cyclo" to the name of the corresponding linear alkane with the same number of carbon atoms in its chain as the cycloalkane has in its ring. For example, the name of cyclopropane (C_{3}H_{6}) containing a three-membered ring is derived from propane (C_{3}H_{8}) - an alkane having three carbon atoms in the main chain.

The naming of polycyclic alkanes such as bicyclic alkanes and spiro alkanes is more complex, with the base name indicating the number of carbons in the ring system, a prefix indicating the number of rings ( "bicyclo-" or "spiro-"), and a numeric prefix before that indicating the number of carbons in each part of each ring, exclusive of junctions. For instance, a bicyclooctane that consists of a six-membered ring and a four-membered ring, which share two adjacent carbon atoms that form a shared edge, is [4.2.0]-bicyclooctane. That part of the six-membered ring, exclusive of the shared edge has 4 carbons. That part of the four-membered ring, exclusive of the shared edge, has 2 carbons. The edge itself, exclusive of the two vertices that define it, has 0 carbons.

There is more than one convention (method or nomenclature) for the naming of compounds, which can be confusing for those who are just learning, and inconvenient for those who are well-rehearsed in the older ways. For beginners, it is best to learn IUPAC nomenclature from a source that is up to date, because this system is constantly being revised. In the above example [4.2.0]-bicyclooctane would be written bicyclo[4.2.0]octane to fit the conventions for IUPAC naming. It then has room for an additional numerical prefix if there is the need to include details of other attachments to the molecule such as chlorine or a methyl group. Another convention for the naming of compounds is the common name, which is a shorter name and it gives less information about the compound. An example of a common name is terpineol, the name of which can tell us only that it is an alcohol (because the suffix "-ol" is in the name) and it should then have a hydroxyl group (–OH) attached to it.

The IUPAC naming system for organic compounds can be demonstrated using the example provided in the adjacent image. The base name of the compound, indicating the total number of carbons in both rings (including the shared edge), is listed first. For instance, "heptane" denotes "hepta-", which refers to the seven carbons, and "-ane", indicating single bonding between carbons. Next, the numerical prefix is added in front of the base name, representing the number of carbons in each ring (excluding the shared carbons) and the number of carbons present in the bridge between the rings. In this example, there are two rings with two carbons each and a single bridge with one carbon, excluding the carbons shared by both the rings. The prefix consists of three numbers that are arranged in descending order, separated by dots: [2.2.1]. Before the numerical prefix is another prefix indicating the number of rings (e.g., "bicyclo+"). Thus, the name is bicyclo[2.2.1]heptane.

Cycloalkanes as a group are also known as naphthenes, a term mainly used in the petroleum industry.

== Properties ==
Containing only C–C and C–H bonds, cycloalkanes are similar to alkanes in their general properties. Cycloalkanes with high angle strain, such as cyclopropane, have weaker C–C bonds, promoting ring-opening reactions.

Cycloalkanes have higher boiling points, melting points, and densities than alkanes. This is due to stronger London forces because the ring shape allows for a larger area of contact.

Even-numbered cycloalkanes tend to have higher melting points than odd-numbered cycloalkanes. While variations in enthalpy and orientational entropy of the solid-phase crystal structure largely explain the odd-even alternation found in alkane melting points, conformational entropy of the solid and liquid phases has a large impact on cycloalkane melting points. For example, cycloundecane has a large number of accessible conformers near room temperature, giving it a low melting point, whereas cyclododecane adopts a single lowest-energy conformation (up to chirality) in both the liquid phase and solid phase (above 199 K), and has a high melting point. These trends are broken from cyclopentadecane onwards, due to increasing solid-phase conformational mobility, though higher cycloalkanes continue to display large odd-even fluctuations in their plastic crystal transition temperatures. Sharp plastic crystal phase transitions disappear from C_{48}H_{96} onwards, and sufficiently high molecular weight cycloalkanes, such as C_{288}H_{576}, have similar crystal lattices and melting points to high-density polyethylene.

=== Table of cycloalkanes ===
Alkane	Formula	Melting point [°C]	Boiling point [°C]	Liquid density [g·cm^{−3}] (at 20 °C)
Cyclopropane	C_{3}H_{6}	−127.6	−32.8	
Cyclobutane	C_{4}H_{8}	−90.7	12.5	0.720
Cyclopentane	C_{5}H_{10}	−93.4	49.3	0.751
Cyclohexane	C_{6}H_{12}	6.7	80.7	0.778
Cycloheptane	C_{7}H_{14}	−8.0	118.8	0.811
Cyclooctane	C_{8}H_{16}	14.5	151.2	0.840
Cyclononane	C_{9}H_{18}	10–11	178.4	0.8534
Cyclodecane	C_{10}H_{20}	9.9	202	0.871
Cycloundecane	C_{11}H_{22}	−7.2	221 (Note: Egloff (1940) instead gives a boiling point of 179–181 °C.)	0.81
Cyclododecane	C_{12}H_{24}	60.4	244.0	0.855 (extrapolated)
Cyclotridecane	C_{13}H_{26}	24.5	256	0.861 (Note: Liquid-phase density measured for a sample melting at 18 °C. The same sample was measured to have a solid density of 0.864 g·cm^{−3} at 16 °C.)
Cyclotetradecane	C_{14}H_{28}	56.2	271	
Cyclopentadecane	C_{15}H_{30}	63.5	286	
Cyclohexadecane	C_{16}H_{32}	60.6	300	
Cycloheptadecane	C_{17}H_{34}	64–67	313	
Cyclooctadecane	C_{18}H_{36}	74–75	325	
Cyclononadecane	C_{19}H_{38}	79–82	337	
Cycloeicosane	C_{20}H_{40}	49.9 (Note: Dale et al. (1963) instead gives a melting point of 61–62 °C.)	348	

== Ring strain ==
In cycloalkanes, the carbon atoms are sp^{3} hybridized, which would imply an ideal tetrahedral bond angle of approximately 109.47° whenever possible. Owing to the nature polygons, rings with 3, 4, and (to a small extent) also 5 atoms can only afford narrower interior angles; the consequent deviation from the ideal tetrahedral bond angles causes an increase in potential energy and an overall destabilizing effect. Eclipsing of hydrogen atoms is an important destabilizing effect, as well. The strain energy of a cycloalkane is the increase in energy caused by the compound's geometry, and is calculated by comparing the experimental standard enthalpy change of combustion of the cycloalkane with the value calculated using average bond energies. Molecular mechanics calculations are well suited to identify the many conformations occurring particularly in medium rings.

Ring strain is highest for cyclopropane, in which the carbon atoms form a triangle and therefore have 60° C–C–C bond angles. There are also three pairs of eclipsed hydrogens. The ring strain is calculated to be around 120 kJ mol^{−1}.

Cyclobutane has the carbon atoms in a puckered square with approximately 90° bond angles; "puckering" reduces the eclipsing interactions between hydrogen atoms. Its ring strain is therefore slightly less, at around 110 kJ mol^{−1}.

For a theoretical planar cyclopentane the C–C–C bond angles would be 108°, very close to the measure of the tetrahedral angle. Actual cyclopentane molecules are puckered, but this changes only the bond angles slightly so that angle strain is relatively small. The eclipsing interactions are also reduced, leaving a ring strain of about 25 kJ mol^{−1}.

In cyclohexane the ring strain and eclipsing interactions are negligible because the puckering of the ring allows ideal tetrahedral bond angles to be achieved. In the most stable chair form of cyclohexane, axial hydrogens on adjacent carbon atoms are pointed in opposite directions, virtually eliminating eclipsing strain. In medium-sized rings (7 to 13 carbon atoms) conformations in which the angle strain is minimised create transannular strain or Pitzer strain. At these ring sizes, one or more of these sources of strain must be present, resulting in an increase in strain energy, which peaks at 9 carbons (around 50 kJ mol^{−1}). After that, strain energy slowly decreases until 12 carbon atoms, where it drops significantly; at 14, another significant drop occurs and the strain is on a level comparable with 10 kJ mol^{−1}. At larger ring sizes there is little or no strain since there are many accessible conformations corresponding to a diamond lattice.

Ring strain can be considerably higher in bicyclic systems. For example, bicyclobutane, C_{4}H_{6}, is noted for being one of the most strained compounds that is isolatable on a large scale; its strain energy is estimated at 267 kJ mol^{−1}.

== Synthesis reactions ==
Cycloalkanes, referred to as naphthenes, are a major substrate for the catalytic reforming process. In the presence of a catalyst and at temperatures of about 495 to 525 °C, naphthenes undergo dehydrogenation to give aromatic derivatives:

noice

The process provides a way to produce high octane gasoline.

In another major industrial process, cyclohexanol is produced by the oxidation of cyclohexane in air, typically using cobalt catalysts:

2 C_{6}H_{12} + O_{2} → 2 C_{6}H_{11}OH

This process coforms cyclohexanone, and this mixture ("KA oil" for ketone-alcohol oil) is the main feedstock for the production of adipic acid, used to make nylon.

The small cycloalkanes – in particular, cyclopropane – have a lower stability due to Baeyer strain and ring strain. They react similarly to alkenes, though they do not react in electrophilic addition, but in nucleophilic aliphatic substitution. These reactions are ring-opening reactions or ring-cleavage reactions of alkyl cycloalkanes.

Many simple cycloalkanes are obtained from petroleum. They can be produced by hydrogenation of unsaturated, even aromatic precursors.

Numerous methods exist for preparing cycloalkanes by ring-closing reactions of difunctional precursors. For example, diesters are cyclized in the Dieckmann condensation:

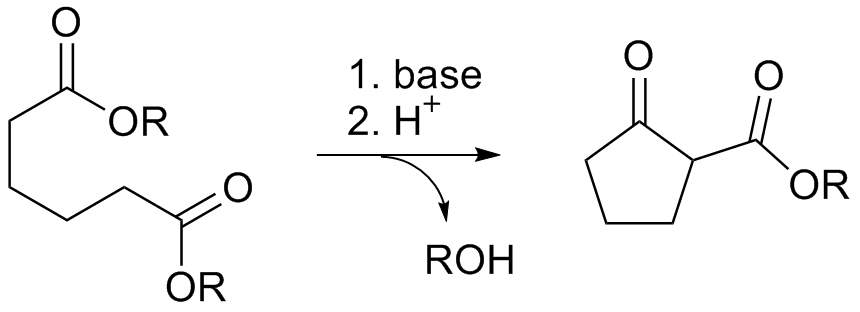
The Dieckmann condensation

The acyloin condensation can be deployed similarly.

For larger rings (macrocyclizations) more elaborate methods are required since intramolecular ring closure competes with intermolecular reactions.

The Diels-Alder reaction, a [4+2] cycloaddition, provides a route to cyclohexenes:

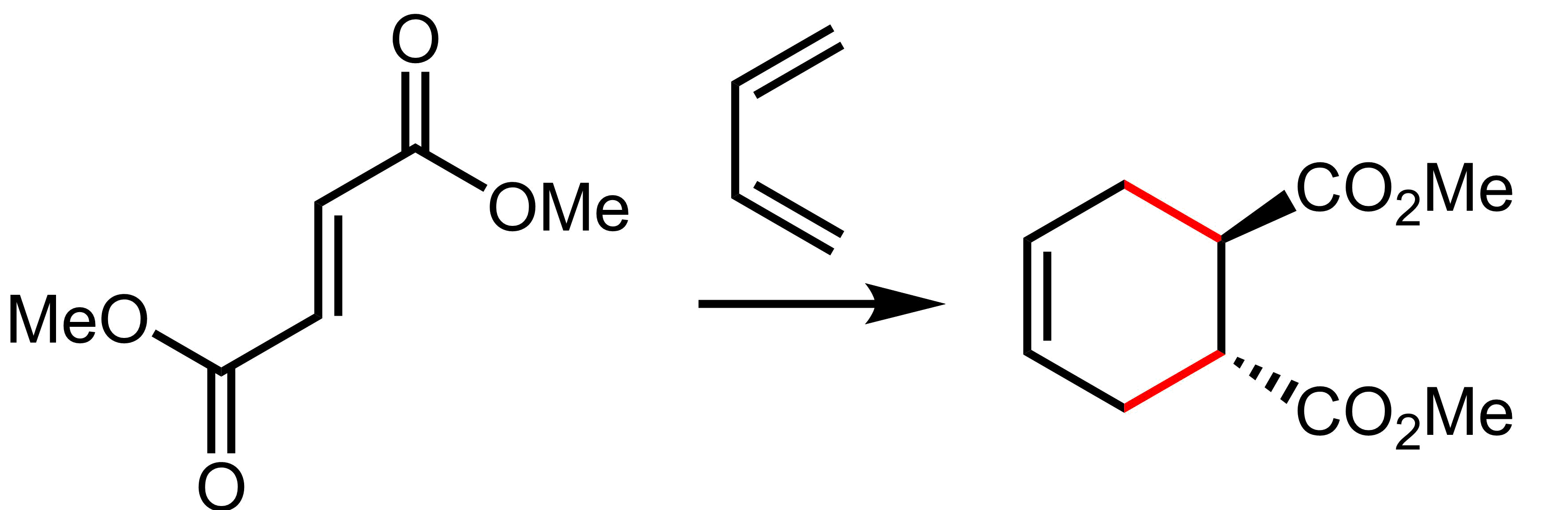
The Dieckmann condensation

The corresponding [2+2] cycloaddition reactions, which usually require photochemical activation, result in cyclobutanes.

== See also ==
- Prelog strain
- Conformational isomerism
- Alkane
- Cycloalkene
- Cycloalkyne
