= Bonny Light oil =

High grade of Nigerian crude oil

Bonny light oil
- Country: Nigeria
- Region: Oloibiri
- Offshore/onshore: Offshore

Field history
- Discovery: in 1956

Bonny Light oil was found at Oloibiri in the Niger delta region of Nigeria in 1956 for its commercial use. Due to its features of generating high profit, it is highly demanded by refiners. Bonny light oil has an API of 32.9, classified as light oil. It is regarded as more valuable than the other oils with lower API as more high-value products are produced in the refinement. However, in Nigeria, problems due to oil spillage caused by vandalism affect both humans and the ecosystem in detrimental ways. Some experiments on animals and soil are done to figure out those impacts on organisms.

== Background ==
=== Origin ===
Crude oil is a yellow to black coloured liquid that exists by nature without artificial factors, observed in geological rock formations underneath the superficial parts of the earth. Systematic exploration for commercial oil began in Nigeria the late 1930s. Years later, substantial oil was discovered at Oloibiri in the Niger Delta region in 1956. As oil exploration expanded, Bonny Light Crude was produced. Bonny Light has many advantages over Sour Crude. That makes its price generally higher. Nigeria is now the eleventh largest crude oil producer in the world. The largest buyer of Nigerian crude is India. In addition to India, The United States, China, Spain, Netherlands and The United Kingdom also import Bonny Light Crude periodically.

=== Chemical composition ===
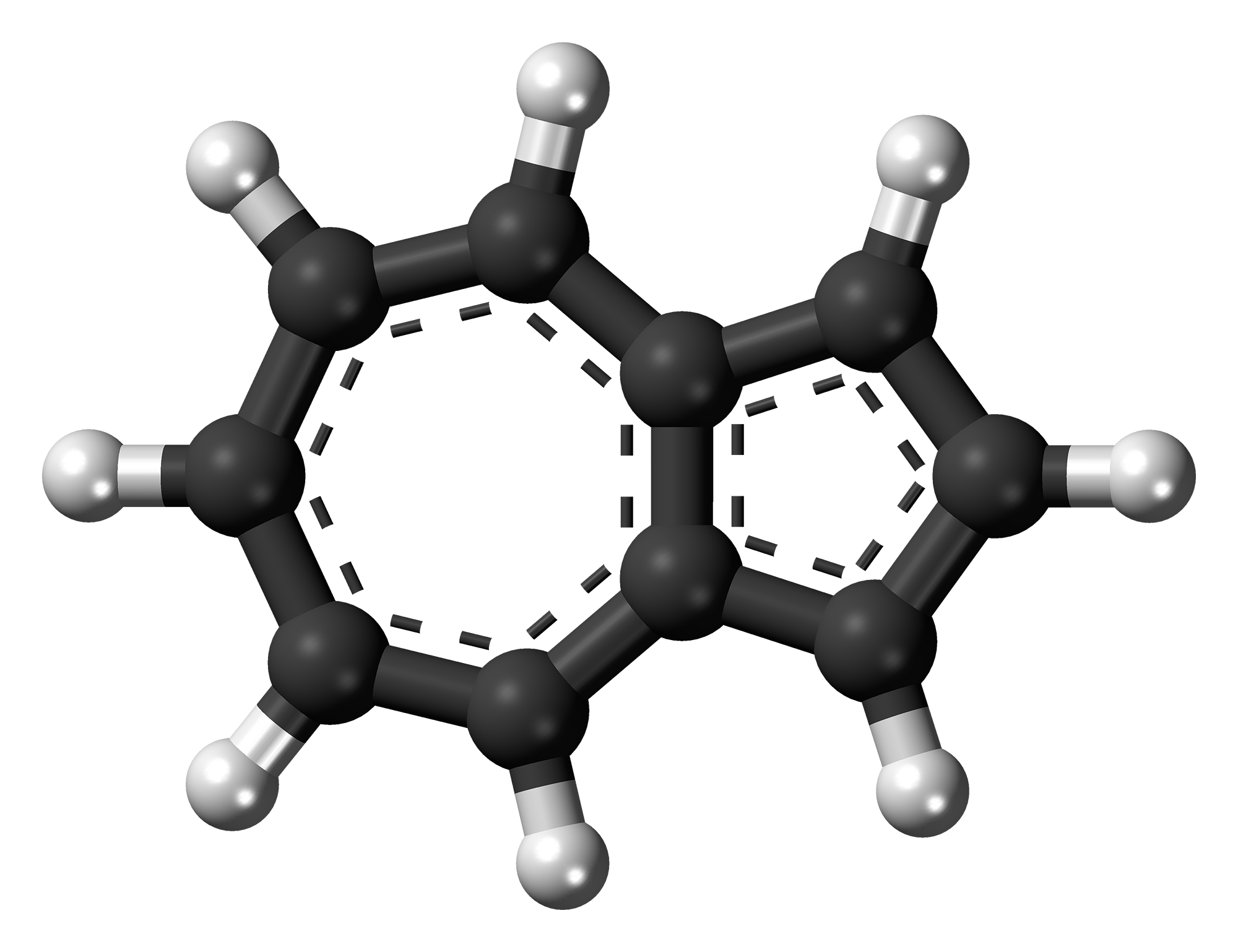
Azulene molecule ball

The components of crude oil have a wide range, containing hydrocarbons and a mixture of oxygen, sulfur, nitrogen and trace metals. Hydrocarbon of crude oil consists of paraffin, cycloparaffins and aromatic material with at least one benzene ring. Bonny light oil also includes polycyclic aromatic hydrocarbons. Almost all of these elements, such as vanadium, nickel, asphaltenes, and poly-aromatic hydrocarbons, are known as toxic.

=== Indigenous Uses ===
Legend has it that the indigenous people of the Niger Delta attempted to use crude oil for lighting because of its flammable trait in earlier times. However, it was not appropriate in lamps because of its stink and intense fumes while it burned. It holds a certain importance in the metaphysical beliefs of the Niger Delta people as they believed it cured illnesses related to ingestion, such as gastrointestinal disorders and fertility. As such, remedial uses for it came up in detoxification and the treatment of poison, anti-convulsion and dermal inflammation, etc. People ingested Bonny Light Crude directly, usually, along with olive oil. They applied it on burnt skin, fungating feet and leg ulcers.

Also, as a way of complementing protein, most of the people in the Delta ate marine animals from coastal areas, which is a form of consuming crude oil indirectly.

== Features ==
=== Low sulfur ===
The value of fuels and oils which are generated from the crude oil falls off due to its sulfur compounds. “They cause corrosion of equipment during treatment, reduce activity of antidetonation additives and antioxidizing stability of gasoline, raise the propensity to form hard residues in cracking gasoline fractions, and result and environment pollution". According to world standards, the content of sulfur in BLCO is low, so refinery infrastructure is less affected by corrosion and low impact on environment which his occurred by its byproducts. The sulfur content varies from 0.14% to 0.16%. If less than 1% of sulfur is included in crude oil, it is assorted into sweet, which means low sulfur content.

=== Good gasoline yields ===
There are three types of crude oil, light, medium and heavy, according to its density. For gasoline blends, composites which are lighter hydrocarbons are used. Molecular weights of these hydrocarbons are lower than heptane. Since most of Nigerian crudes are either light or medium sweet, creating plentiful amount of diesel, they are more costly than sour crudes. Gasoline is produced from processed crude oil and it is highly valued petroleum products. Therefore, to have maximized profit, refiners seek to boost gasoline yields.

=== High API gravity ===
API gravity, American Petroleum Institute gravity, is a reverse method to decide “the weight of petroleum liquids in comparison to water”. If the API gravity exceeds 10, the liquid will float on the water and is classified to light oil. Therefore, the higher API means the lighter crude oil and it is regarded as more precious than crude oil with lower API (heavier crude) as it generates more high-value products during refinery process. The API range of light crude is between 35 and 45, and BLCO has an API of 32.9.

== Effects ==
=== Society ===
Nigeria has been generating most of its revenue from oil industry for the past 30 years. However, since petroleum industry has appeared, many pollution problems have risen in Nigeria. The major problem was caused by oil spills, occurring during usual operations. From 1976 to 1988, 2000 oil spillages happened in Nigeria and more than two million barrels of bonny light oil were released to the community during this period. Additionally, break of oil pipelines, erosion of flow and trunk lines, and hose failure are the causes of oil spills. Consequently, both the aquatic milieu and environment had detrimental impacts by them. These ecosystems are key element in agricultural productivity and main source for Nigerians, inhabiting in the oil-producing areas, to live. Therefore, some activists in Nigeria have spoiled pipelines, and key infrastructures which are related to crude oil and export flows are usually targeted. As a result, the issue related to oil effusion in Nigeria has been exacerbated. In Nigeria, microbial seeding is being considered instead of mechanical ways by the main oil companies for the purpose of cleaning up oil spills.

=== Human ===
People can be exposed to crude oil through various ways, such as skin contact, inhalation, and ingestion, and those can be happened simultaneously. Especially, residents of oil abundant areas are at the risk of exposure to water which has been contaminated by oil. They consume this polluted water by drinking, cooking and cleaning. The exhibition of crude oil to human can affect mentality and occur symptoms such as anxiety, depression, headache, and sore eyes and throat. Additionally, it causes various troubles with regard to brain, endocrine and DNA. There is a reported case that shows how fatal effects can occur to human due to crude oil. A child, exposed to BLCO to cure febrile convulsion, had symptoms of “sequel of shock, acute renal failure, mechanical intestinal obstruction, extensive epidermolysis, conjunctivitis, mucositis, oesophagitis and chemical pneumonitis"

=== Potential risks ===
As BLCO contains materials like vanadium, nickel and PAH, those tend to be harmful and disturb possibility of antioxidant. Heavy metals are necessary in metabolic process of creatures; however, they are the causes of physiological stress at the same time. Pollution problems by oil spills like soils contamination are continuous and prevalent, putting severe health and environmental threats. The pollutants can gradually accumulate in food chains and interrupt biological actions of creatures. Petroleum contaminants are pernicious to nature and moreover, their hydrocarbon elements which are mutagenic and causing cancers, entail immunomodulatory impacts on humans and organisms as well. The symptoms of risks can appear immediately or emerge after some time.

== Experiment ==
=== Rats ===
The copper level of rats that are exposed to crude oil noticeably shrank which indicates ejection of copper with lack of its absorption. Synthesis of catecholamine which enables total functions of body, emotions, and perception may be hindered by reduction of copper concentration. In addition to it, a rise in the activities of superoxide dismutase (SOD), chloramphenicol acetyltransferase (CAT), and glutathione S-transferase (GST) enzymes, in proportion to dose was seen in the rats, which were treated with BLCO for 21 days in a row. This phenomenon means induction of enzymes and especially in the case of GST, its increase may contribute to the availability of glutathione (GSH). Adedara and Farombi say that "Elevated level of intracellular hepatic GSH concentration observed in the BLCO-treated rats indicates an adaptive response to reduce damage and promote better survival under the conditions of oxidative stress induced by BLCO treatment". The elicitation of GSH in testes and sperm is controlled by BLCO. In contrast to rats treated for 21 days, the activities of those enzymes in rats exposed to BLCO for 45 days were decreased. Furthermore, in terms of sperms, noticeable shrink in mobility, number, and life/dead ratio was shown and total abnormality was elevated. However, abnormalities in sperms occurred by bonny light oil were able to be relieved with the help of vitamin E or quercetin. They have functions that restore normal hormonal levels and sperm parameters as well as inhibit oxidation.

=== Fish ===
After the fishes were treated with BLCO for 30days, the blood glucose outstandingly elevated, dose dependent of crude oil. Similarly, the degree of total protein concentration and albumin levels increased in proportion to the amount of BLCO. aspartate transaminase (AST) and alanine transaminase (ALT) concentrations rose too. Fishes which are exposed to crude oil get to have PAHs in their tissue and according to Wegwu and Omeodu, they “are activated to highly reactive epoxides by cytochrome P450-containing enzyme systems”. DNA bases automatically respond with these epoxides and point mutations are occurred as a result of it. With regard to glucose levels, if they are extremely high, it means severe oxidation stress in fish. In addition to it, excessive total protein levels of fish specify water imbalance and damage of haemo-concentration. These are resulted by harmful components of crude oil and it would induce damage in cellular membrane, less fluidity in membrane and elimination of cell as well.

=== Soil ===
Isolates from coal power plant soil are being recognized as pseudomonas and show that they are able to “grow on both the aliphatic and aromatic fractions of petroleum". The aliphatic fraction accounts for the most of crude oil and it is easily broken down by species of pseudomonas. Concentration of naphthene and aromatics components of crude oil noticeably decreased, implying the catabolic flexibleness of pseudomonas isolates. Salam, Obayori, Akashoro, and Okogie say that with incubation of pseudomonas isolates at 1g/L concentration for 21days, 90% of BLCO was broken down which means almost all of aliphatic fragments were vanished and aromatic fragments remarkably decreased. Although there are some microorganisms which are able to degrade crude oil, pseudomonas group shows up as it is the most adaptable.

There are two main seasons which are dry and rainy in Nigeria. In the dry season, the temperature of soil varies between 30 and 45 °C, while it changes from 20 to 30 °C during the dry season. The ability of bacteria in soil to break down crude oil is remarkably affected by the average temperatures, pH, and nutrients in the soil that are quite different by seasons.

For the experiment that is conducted incubation of Pseudomonas sp and Bacillus sp at the different temperature from 20 to 44 °C and for different time from 6 to 24days, both of bacteria showed the highest amount of degradation of bonny light oil at 36 °C. The amount of degradation of crude oil diversified according to the temperature. For example, Pseudomonas sp which is incubated for 24days decomposed 59.1% and 67.6% of crude oil at 28 °C and 36 °C respectively. In the case of Bacillus sp, it broke down each 71.4% and 77.8% of crude oil at 28 °C and 36 °C. The lowest amount of crude oil was degraded at 44 °C by Pseudomonas sp and at 20 °C by Bacillus sp. Exposure of both bacteria to the crude oil at 28 °C for 14days showed a different level of BLCO degradation depending on pH level. At pH 7.0, the largest degree of crude oil degradation was seen by Bacillus sp, while Pseudomonas sp decayed BLCO the most at pH 7.4. After its peak decomposition of crude oil, the level of degradation decreased drastically no matter how high pH was. The abilities of decomposition differ but it has proved that some bacteria in soil are capable of biodegradation of bonny light oil. Therefore, those bacteria can contribute to purifying soil that are polluted by crude oil.

=== Tadpole ===
The tadpoles of African clawed frog were treated with 10,20, or 30 ppm of Water soluble fraction (WSF), Water insoluble fraction (WIF), and whole crude (WC). Although the exposure to these substances did not cause death, the weights of the tadpoles were affected. After being released for two weeks, whole crude or its WSF aroused weight loss in the tadpoles. In the case of WIF, weight loss happened only when 30 ppm of it was exposed to the tadpoles. In contrast to it, when tadpoles were contacted with WC or its fractions for four weeks, all the tadpoles lost their weight. The weight loss of tadpoles suggests the harmful effect of chemicals and a high Malondialdehyde (MDA) level indicates tissue damage of tadpoles.

After four weeks of exposure, the level of MDA remarkably increased in the proportion to the amount of crude oil, and liquid peroxidation was the highest in the tadpoles which are treated with WSF. Compared to two weeks of exposure, the activities of antioxidant enzymes, such as SOD and glutathione reductase (GR), were reduced in week 4.
