= C7H14 =

The molecular formula C_{7}H_{14} (molar mass: 98.19 g/mol, exact mass: 98.1096 u) may refer to:

- Cycloheptane
- Heptene
- Methylcyclohexane
