= Water associated fraction =

The water associated fraction (WAF), sometimes termed the water-soluble fraction (W.S.F.), is the solution of low molecular mass hydrocarbons naturally released from petroleum hydrocarbon mixtures in contact with water. Although generally regarded as hydrophobic, many petroleum hydrocarbons are soluble in water to a limited extent. This combination often also contains less soluble, higher molecular mass components, and more soluble products of chemical and biological degradation.

== Toxicity ==
Low molecular mass compounds account for much of the toxic nature of hydrocarbon spills. In particular, benzene, toluene, ethyl benzene and the xylenes (BTEX) are of great environmental interest due to their availability to organisms. This availability, also influenced by volatility and reactivity, impacts on biodegradation and bioremediation in water and soil environments, with even dissolved components within pore water considered bioavailable.

== Concentration ==
The WAF is found in greatest concentration close to the bulk phase of hydrocarbons, the progress of which is often limited by physical containment measures such as booms. The dissolved components of petroleum mixtures such as crude oil can become subject to the transport mechanisms of the bulk aqueous phase. Source identification of these can therefore become problematic without the visual indications usually expected with petroleum hydrocarbon spills. However, after relatively short periods of exposure, the chemical profile of the original oils is still largely intact, allowing chemical analysis to provide identification and discriminate between different petroleum sources.

== Dissolution ==
In freshwater aquatic environments, dissolution is the greatest physical weathering process after evaporation. Under the same conditions, the rate of dissolution is between 0.01% and 1% of the rate of evaporation for alkanes and aromatic compounds. Once dissolved, these components are more available to organisms and therefore susceptible to biodegradation processes and experience increased rates of photochemical and chemical degradation. These components represent some of the most toxic oil ingredients because of their increased bioavailability, with reduction in toxicity occurring on emulsification or absorption to colloids which restrict availability to organisms.
