= Hydrocarbon =

Organic compound consisting entirely of hydrogen and carbon

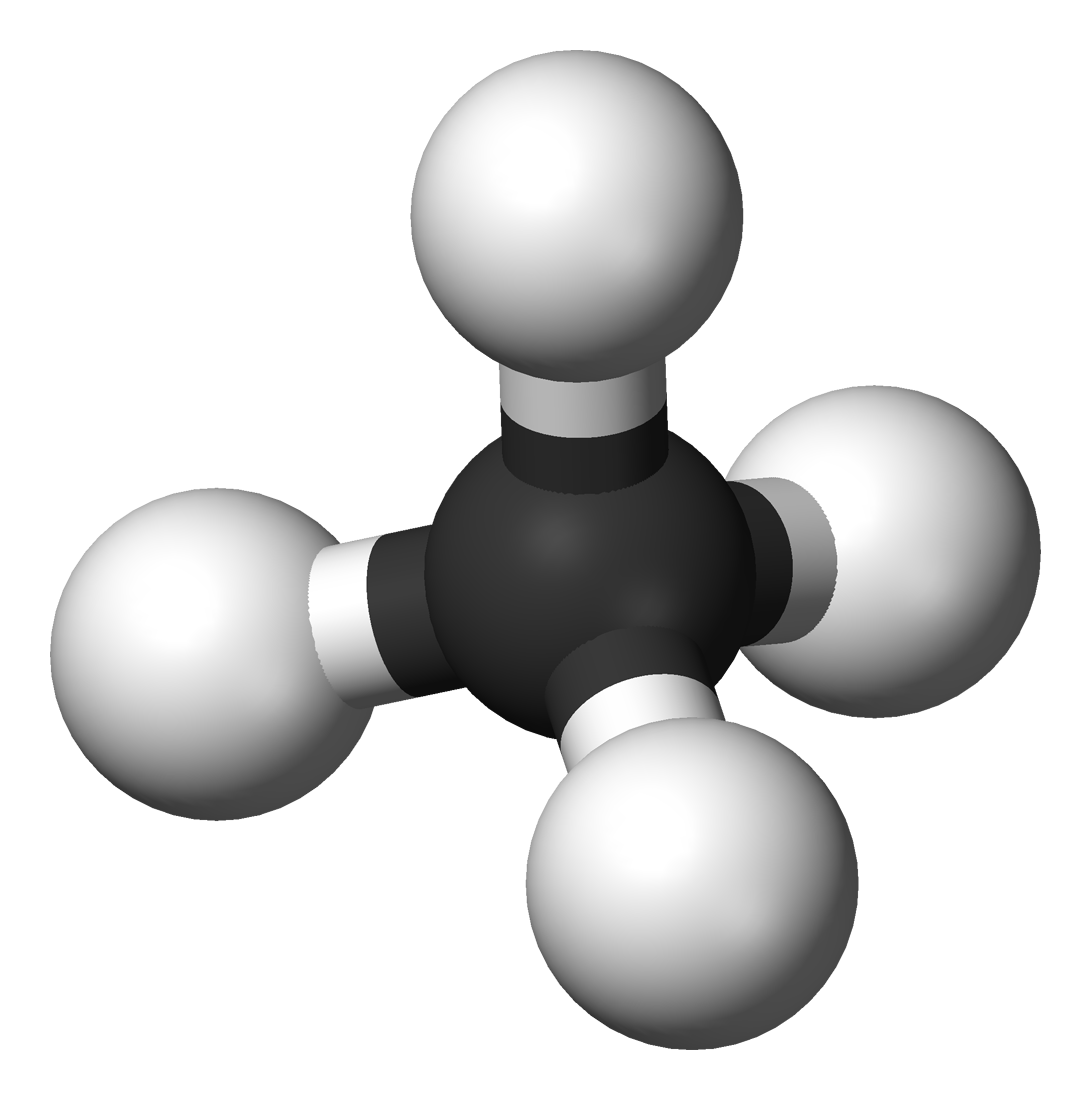
Ball-and-stick model of the methane molecule, CH_{4}. Methane is part of a homologous series known as the alkanes, which contain single bonds only.

In organic chemistry, a hydrocarbon is an organic compound consisting entirely of hydrogen and carbon. Hydrocarbons are examples of group 14 hydrides. Hydrocarbons are generally colourless and hydrophobic; their odor is usually faint, and may be similar to that of gasoline or lighter fluid. They occur in a diverse range of molecular structures and phases: they can be gases (such as methane and propane), liquids (such as hexane and benzene), low melting solids (such as paraffin wax and naphthalene) or polymers (such as polyethylene and polystyrene).

In the fossil fuel industries, hydrocarbon refers to naturally occurring petroleum, natural gas and coal, or their hydrocarbon derivatives and purified forms. Combustion of hydrocarbons is the main source of the world's energy. Petroleum is the dominant raw-material source for organic commodity chemicals such as solvents and polymers. Most anthropogenic (human-generated) emissions of greenhouse gases are either carbon dioxide released by the burning of fossil fuels, or methane released from the handling of natural gas or from agriculture.

== Types ==
As defined by the International Union of Pure and Applied Chemistry's nomenclature of organic chemistry, hydrocarbons are classified as follows:

1. Saturated hydrocarbons, which are the simplest of the hydrocarbon types. They are composed entirely of single bonds and are saturated with hydrogen. The formula for acyclic saturated hydrocarbons (i.e., alkanes) is C_{n}H_{2n+2}. The most general form of saturated hydrocarbons, (whether linear or branched species, and whether with or without one or more rings) is C_{n}H_{2n+2(1-r)}, where r is the number of rings. Those with exactly one ring are the cycloalkanes. Saturated hydrocarbons are the basis of petroleum fuels and may be either linear or branched species. One or more of the hydrogen atoms can be replaced with other atoms, for example chlorine or another halogen: this is called a substitution reaction. An example is the conversion of methane to chloroform using a chlorination reaction. Halogenating a hydrocarbon produces something that is not a hydrocarbon. It is a very common and useful process. Hydrocarbons with the same molecular formula but different structural formulae are called structural isomers. As given in the example of 3-methylhexane and its higher homologues, branched hydrocarbons can be chiral. Chiral saturated hydrocarbons constitute the side chains of biomolecules such as chlorophyll and tocopherol.
2. Unsaturated hydrocarbons, which have one or more double or triple bonds between carbon atoms. Those with one or more double bonds are called alkenes. Those with one double bond have the formula C_{n}H_{2n} (assuming non-cyclic structures). Those containing triple bonds are called alkyne. Those with one triple bond have the formula C_{n}H_{2n−2}.
3. Aromatic hydrocarbons, also known as arenes, which are hydrocarbons that have at least one aromatic ring. 10% of total nonmethane organic carbon emission are aromatic hydrocarbons from the exhaust of gasoline-powered vehicles.

The term 'aliphatic' refers to non-aromatic hydrocarbons. Saturated aliphatic hydrocarbons are sometimes referred to as 'paraffins'. Aliphatic hydrocarbons containing a double bond between carbon atoms are sometimes referred to as 'olefins'.

Variations on hydrocarbons based on the number of carbon atoms
Number of carbon atoms	Alkane (single bond)	Alkene (double bond)	Alkyne (triple bond)	Cycloalkane	Alkadiene
1	Methane	—	—	—	—
2	Ethane	Ethene (ethylene)	Ethyne (acetylene)	—	—
3	Propane	Propene (propylene)	Propyne (methylacetylene)	Cyclopropane	Propadiene (allene)
4	Butane	Butene (butylene)	Butyne	Cyclobutane	Butadiene
5	Pentane	Pentene	Pentyne	Cyclopentane	Pentadiene (piperylene)
6	Hexane	Hexene	Hexyne	Cyclohexane	Hexadiene
7	Heptane	Heptene	Heptyne	Cycloheptane	Heptadiene
8	Octane	Octene	Octyne	Cyclooctane	Octadiene
9	Nonane	Nonene	Nonyne	Cyclononane	Nonadiene
10	Decane	Decene	Decyne	Cyclodecane	Decadiene
11	Undecane	Undecene	Undecyne	Cycloundecane	Undecadiene
12	Dodecane	Dodecene	Dodecyne	Cyclododecane	Dodecadiene

== Usage ==
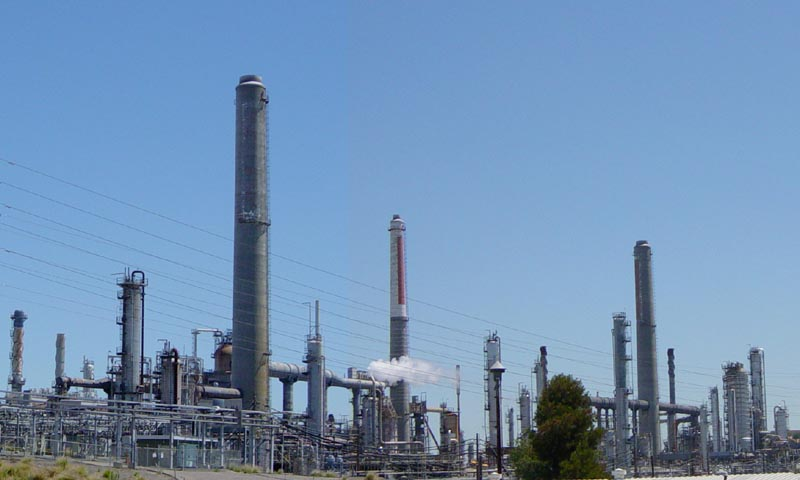
Oil refineries are one way hydrocarbons are processed for use. Crude oil is processed in several stages to form desired hydrocarbons, used as fuel and in other products.

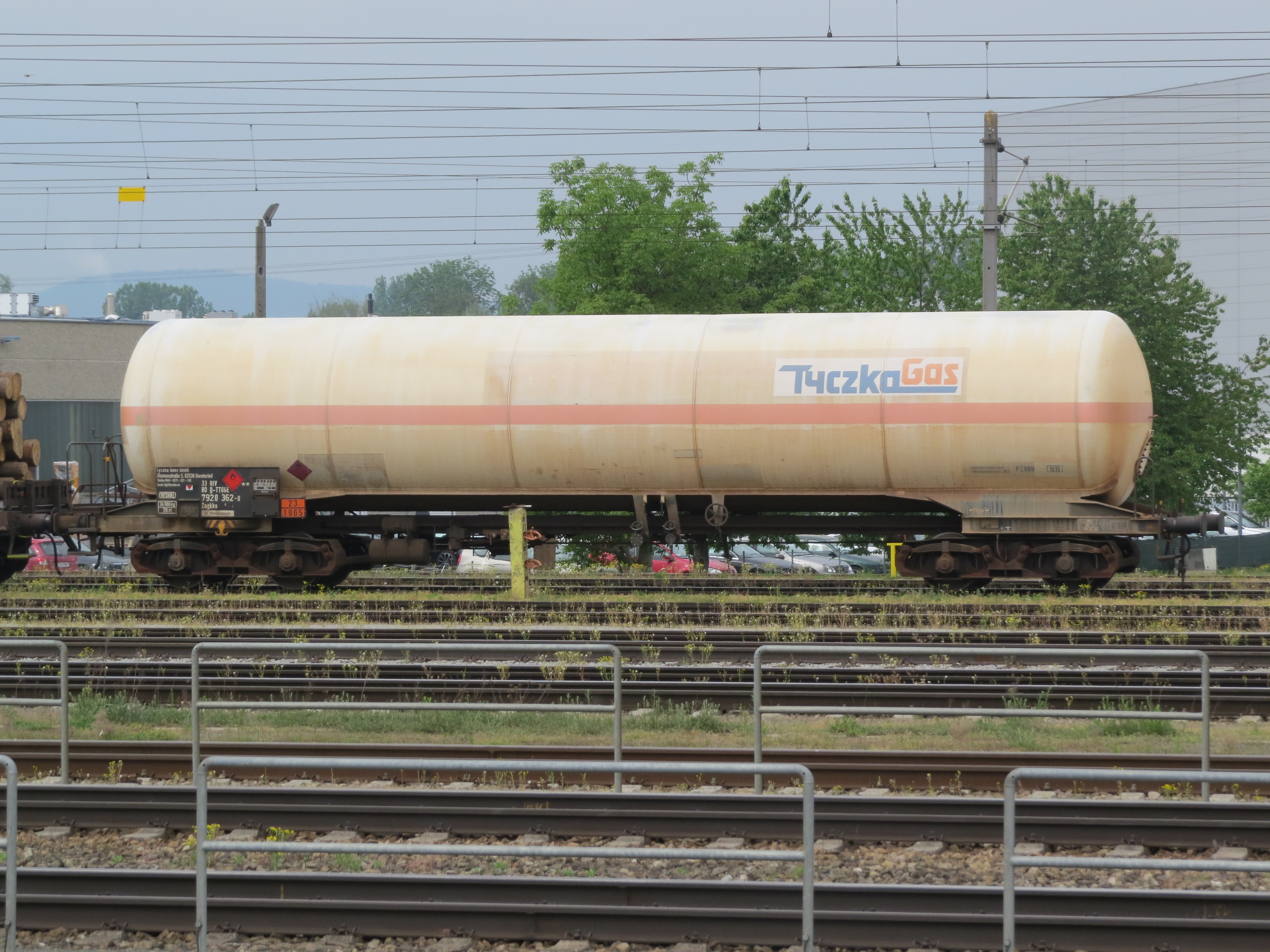
Tank wagon 33 80 7920 362–0 with hydrocarbon gas at Bahnhof Enns (2018)

The predominant use of hydrocarbons is as a combustible fuel source. Methane is the predominant component of natural gas. C^{6} through C^{10} alkanes, alkenes, cycloalkanes, and aromatic hydrocarbons are the main components of gasoline, naphtha, jet fuel, and specialized industrial solvent mixtures. With the progressive addition of carbon units, the simple non-ring structured hydrocarbons have higher viscosities, lubricating indices, boiling points, and solidification temperatures. At the opposite extreme from methane lie the heavy tars that remain as the lowest fraction in a crude oil refining retort. They are collected and widely utilized as roofing compounds, pavement material (bitumen), wood preservatives (the creosote series) and as extremely high viscosity shear-resisting liquids.

Some large-scale non-fuel applications of hydrocarbons begin with ethane and propane, which are obtained from petroleum and natural gas. These two gases are converted either to syngas or to ethylene and propylene respectively. Global consumption of benzene in 2021 is estimated at more than 58 million metric tons, which will increase to 60 million tons in 2022.

Hydrocarbons are also prevalent in nature. Some eusocial arthropods, such as the Brazilian stingless bee, Schwarziana quadripunctata, use unique cuticular hydrocarbon "scents" in order to determine kin from non-kin. This hydrocarbon composition varies between age, sex, nest location, and hierarchal position.

There is also potential to harvest hydrocarbons from plants like Euphorbia lathyris and E. tirucalli as an alternative and renewable energy source for vehicles that use diesel. Furthermore, endophytic bacteria from plants that naturally produce hydrocarbons have been used in hydrocarbon degradation in attempts to deplete hydrocarbon concentration in polluted soils.

== Reactions ==
Saturated hydrocarbons are notable for their inertness. Unsaturated hydrocarbons (alkenes, alkynes and aromatic compounds) react more readily, by means of substitution, addition, polymerization. At higher temperatures they undergo dehydrogenation, oxidation and combustion.

=== Saturated hydrocarbons ===
==== Cracking ====
The cracking of saturated hydrocarbons is the main industrial route to alkenes and alkyne. These reactions require heterogeneous catalysts and temperatures >500 °C.

=== Oxidation ===
Oxidation of hydrocarbons involves their reaction with oxygen. In the presence of excess oxygen, hydrocarbons combust. With careful conditions, which have been optimized for many years, partial oxidation results. Useful compounds can be obtained in this way: maleic acid from butane, terephthalic acid from xylenes, acetone together with phenol from cumene (isopropylbenzene), and cyclohexanone from cyclohexane. The process, which is called autoxidation, begins with the formation of hydroperoxides (ROOH).

==== Combustion ====
Combustion of hydrocarbons is currently the main source of the world's energy for electric power generation, heating (such as home heating), and transportation. Often this energy is used directly as heat such as in home heaters, which use either petroleum or natural gas. The hydrocarbon is burnt and the heat is used to heat water, which is then circulated. A similar principle is used to create electrical energy in power plants. Both saturated and unsaturated hydrocarbons undergo this process.

Common properties of hydrocarbons are the facts that they produce steam, carbon dioxide and heat during combustion and that oxygen is required for combustion to take place. The simplest hydrocarbon, methane, burns as follows:

$$\ce{\underset{methane}{CH4} + 2O2 -> CO2 + 2H2O}$$

In inadequate supply of air, carbon black and water vapour are formed:

$$\ce{\underset{methane}{CH4} + O2 -> C + 2H2O}$$

And finally, for any linear alkane of n carbon atoms,

$$\ce{C}_n \ce{H}_{2n+2} + \left({{3n+1}\over 2}\right)\ce{O2->} n\ce{CO2} + (n+1)\ce{H2O}$$

Partial oxidation characterizes the reactions of alkenes and oxygen. This process is the basis of rancidification and paint drying.

Benzene burns with sooty flame when heated in air:

$$\ce{\underset{benzene}{C6H6} + {15\over 2}O2 -> 6CO2 {+} 3H2O}$$

==== Halogenation ====
Saturated hydrocarbons react with chlorine and fluorine. In the case of chlorination, one of the chlorine atoms replaces a hydrogen atom. The reactions proceed via free-radical pathways, in which the halogen first dissociates into two neutral radical atoms (homolytic fission).

CH_{4} + Cl_{2} → CH_{3}Cl + HCl
CH_{3}Cl + Cl_{2} → CH_{2}Cl_{2} + HCl

all the way to CCl_{4} (carbon tetrachloride)

C_{2}H_{6} + Cl_{2} → C_{2}H_{5}Cl + HCl
C_{2}H_{4}Cl_{2} + Cl_{2} → C_{2}H_{3}Cl_{3} + HCl

all the way to C_{2}Cl_{6} (hexachloroethane)

=== Unsaturated hydrocarbons ===
==== Substitution ====
Aromatic compounds, almost uniquely for hydrocarbons, undergo substitution reactions. The chemical process practiced on the largest scale is the reaction of benzene and ethene to give ethylbenzene:

C_{6}H_{6} + C_{2}H_{4} → C_{6}H_{5}CH_{2}CH_{3}

The resulting ethylbenzene is dehydrogenated to styrene and then polymerized to manufacture polystyrene, a common thermoplastic material.

==== Addition ====
Addition reactions apply to alkenes and alkynes. It is because they add reagents that they are called unsaturated. In this reaction a variety of reagents add "across" the pi-bond(s). Chlorine, hydrogen chloride, water, and hydrogen are illustrative reagents.

Polymerization is a form of addition. Alkenes and some alkynes undergo polymerization by opening of the multiple bonds to produce polyethylene, polybutylene, and polystyrene. The alkyne acetylene polymerizes to produce polyacetylene. Oligomers (chains of a few monomers) may be produced, for example in the Shell higher olefin process, where α-olefins are extended to make longer α-olefins by adding ethylene repeatedly.

=== Metathesis ===
Some hydrocarbons undergo metathesis, in which substituents attached by C–C bonds are exchanged between molecules. For a single C–C bond it is alkane metathesis, for a double C–C bond it is alkene metathesis (olefin metathesis), and for a triple C–C bond it is alkyne metathesis.

== Origin ==
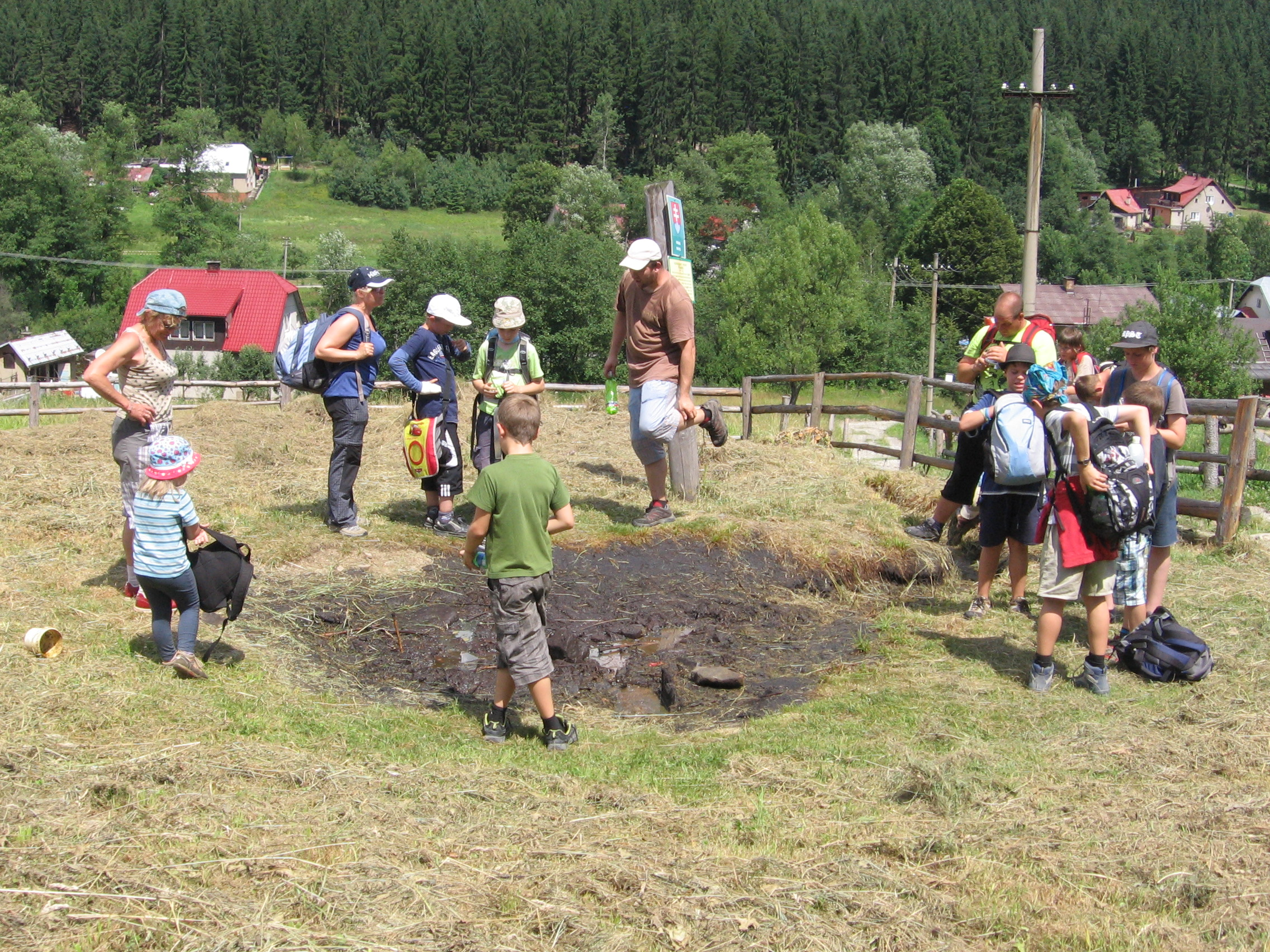
Natural oil spring in Korňa, Slovakia

The vast majority of hydrocarbons found on Earth occur in crude oil, petroleum, coal, and natural gas. For thousands of years they have been exploited and used for a vast range of purposes. Petroleum (lit. 'rock oil') and coal are generally thought to be products of decomposition of organic matter. Coal, in contrast to petroleum, is richer in carbon and poorer in hydrogen. Natural gas is the product of methanogenesis.

A seemingly limitless variety of compounds comprise petroleum, hence the necessity of refineries. These hydrocarbons consist of saturated hydrocarbons, aromatic hydrocarbons, or combinations of the two. Missing in petroleum are alkenes and alkynes. Their production requires refineries. Petroleum-derived hydrocarbons are mainly consumed for fuel, but they are also the source of virtually all synthetic organic compounds, including plastics and pharmaceuticals. Natural gas is consumed almost exclusively as fuel. Coal is used as a fuel and as a reducing agent in metallurgy.

A small fraction of hydrocarbon found on earth, and all currently known hydrocarbon found on other planets and moons, is thought to be abiological.

Hydrocarbons such as ethylene, isoprene, and monoterpenes are emitted by living vegetation.

Some hydrocarbons also are widespread and abundant in the Solar System. Lakes of liquid methane and ethane have been found on Titan, Saturn's largest moon, as confirmed by the Cassini–Huygens space probe. Hydrocarbons are also abundant in nebulae forming polycyclic aromatic hydrocarbon compounds.

== Environmental impact ==
Burning hydrocarbons as fuel, which produces carbon dioxide and water, is a major contributor to anthropogenic global warming. Hydrocarbons are introduced into the environment through their extensive use as fuels and chemicals as well as through leaks or accidental spills during exploration, production, refining, or transport of fossil fuels. Anthropogenic hydrocarbon contamination of soil is a serious global issue due to contaminant persistence and the negative impact on human health.

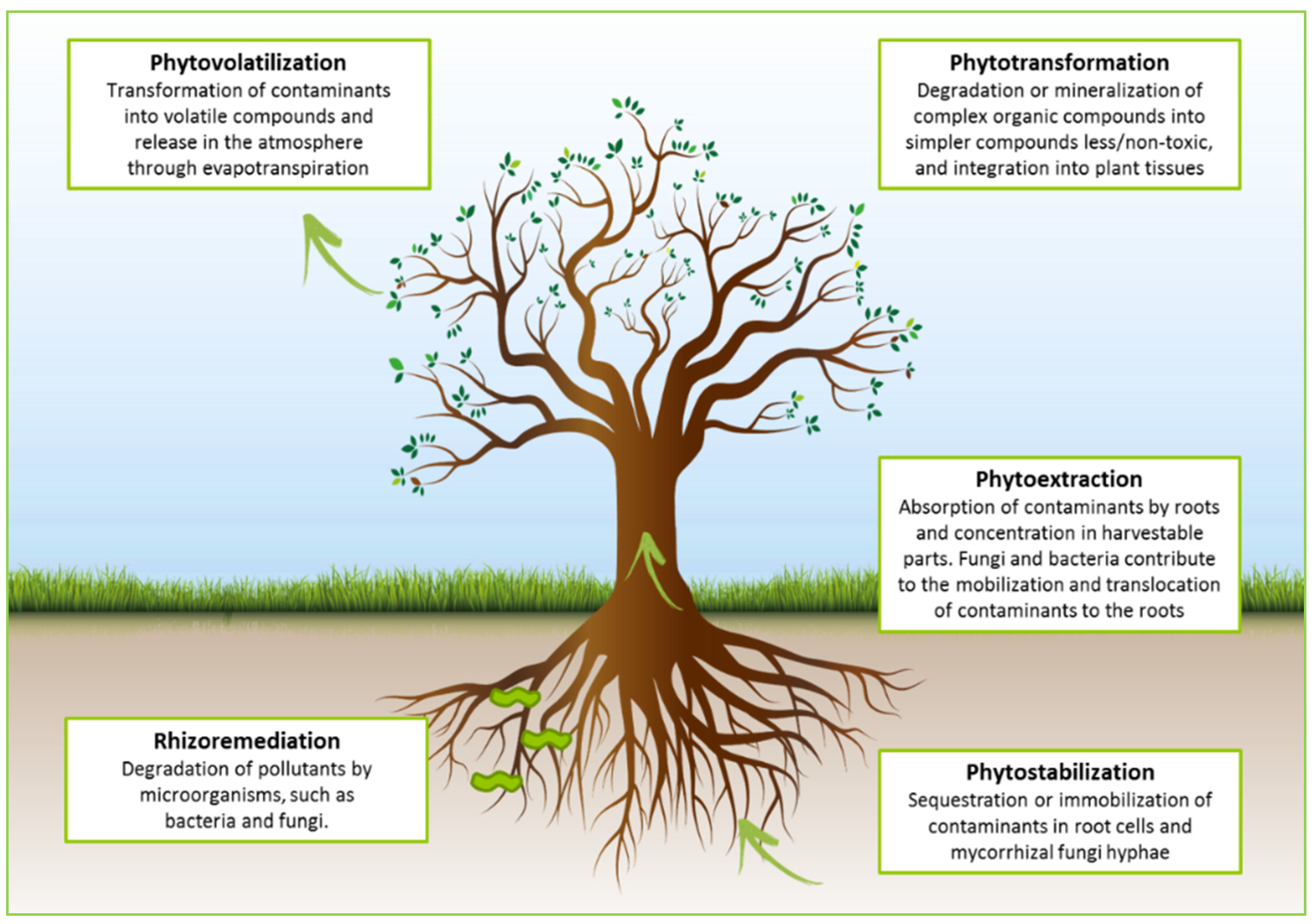
Mechanisms involved in hydrocarbon phytoremediation

When soil is contaminated by hydrocarbons, it can have a significant impact on its microbiological, chemical, and physical properties. This can serve to prevent, slow down or even accelerate the growth of vegetation depending on the exact changes that occur. Crude oil and natural gas are the two largest sources of hydrocarbon contamination of soil.

=== Bioremediation ===
Bioremediation of hydrocarbon from soil or water contaminated is a formidable challenge because of the chemical inertness that characterizes hydrocarbons (hence they survived millions of years in the source rock). Nonetheless, many strategies have been devised, bioremediation being prominent. The basic problem with bioremediation is the paucity of enzymes that act on them. Nonetheless, the area has received regular attention. Bacteria in the gabbroic layer of the ocean's crust can degrade hydrocarbons; but the extreme environment makes research difficult. Other bacteria such as Lutibacterium anuloederans can also degrade hydrocarbons. Mycoremediation or breaking down of hydrocarbon by mycelium and mushrooms is possible.

== Safety ==
Hydrocarbons are generally of low toxicity, hence the widespread use of gasoline and related volatile products. Aromatic compounds such as benzene and toluene are narcotic and chronic toxins, and benzene in particular is known to be carcinogenic. Certain rare polycyclic aromatic compounds are carcinogenic. Hydrocarbons are highly flammable.

== See also ==
- Abiogenic petroleum origin
- Biomass to liquid
- Carbohydrate
- Energy storage
- Fractional distillation
- Functional group
- Hydrocarbon mixtures
- Organic nuclear reactor
