= C14H28 =

The molecular formula C_{14}H_{28} (molar mass: 196.37 g/mol, exact mass: 196.2191 u) may refer to:

- Cyclotetradecane
- Tetradecene
