= C16H32 =

The molecular formula C_{16}H_{32} (molar mass: 224.32 g/mol) may refer to:

- Cyclohexadecane
- 1-Hexadecene
