= C13H26 =

The molecular formula C_{13}H_{26} (molar mass: 182.34 g/mol, exact mass: 182.2035 u) may refer to:

- Cyclotridecane
- Tridecene
