= C11H22 =

The molecular formula C_{11}H_{22} (molar mass: 154.29 g/mol, exact mass: 154.1722 u) may refer to:

- Cycloundecane
- Undecene
