= C10H20 =

The molecular formula C_{10}H_{20} (molar mass: 140.26 g/mol, exact mass: 140.1565 u) may refer to:

- Cyclodecane
- Decene
- p-Menthane
