= Cyclooctane =

Chemical compound

Names
- Preferred IUPAC name Cyclooctane
- Other names Cyclo-octane

Identifiers
CAS Number	292-64-8
3D model (JSmol)	Interactive image
ChEMBL	ChEMBL452651
ChemSpider	8909
ECHA InfoCard	100.005.484
PubChem CID	9266
UNII	KKZ3KBS654
CompTox Dashboard (EPA)	DTXSID9075377
- InChI: InChI=1S/C8H16/c1-2-4-6-8-7-5-3-1/h1-8H2 Key: WJTCGQSWYFHTAC-UHFFFAOYSA-N; InChI=1/C8H16/c1-2-4-6-8-7-5-3-1/h1-8H2 Key: WJTCGQSWYFHTAC-UHFFFAOYAO
- SMILES: C1CCCCCCC1

Properties
Chemical formula	C_{8}H_{16}
Molar mass	112.216 g·mol^{−1}
Density	0.840 g/cm^{3}
Melting point	14.5 °C (58.1 °F; 287.6 K)
Boiling point	151.2 °C (304.2 °F; 424.3 K)
Solubility in water	7.90 mg/L
Magnetic susceptibility (χ)	−91.4·10^{−6} cm^{3}/mol

Related compounds
Related cycloalkanes	Cycloheptane
- Except where otherwise noted, data are given for materials in their standard state (at 25 °C [77 °F], 100 kPa). verify (what is ?) Infobox references

Cyclooctane is a cycloalkane with the molecular formula (CH_{2})_{8}. It is a simple colourless hydrocarbon, but it is often a reference compound for saturated eight-membered ring compounds in general.

Cyclooctane has a camphoraceous odor.

== Conformations ==
The conformation of cyclooctane has been studied extensively using computational methods. Hendrickson noted that "cyclooctane is unquestionably the conformationally most complex cycloalkane owing to the existence of many conformers of comparable energy". The boat-chair conformation (below) is the most stable form. Allinger and co-workers confirmed this. The crown conformation (below) is slightly less stable. Among the many compounds exhibiting the crown conformation (structure II) is S_{8}, elemental sulfur.

Boat-chair		Crown	
Tub	Boat-boat	Twist boat-chair	Twist chair-chair

== Synthesis and reactions ==
The main route to cyclooctane derivatives involves the dimerization of butadiene, catalysed by nickel(0) complexes such as nickel bis(cyclooctadiene). This process affords, among other products, 1,5-cyclooctadiene (COD), which can be hydrogenated. COD is widely used for the preparation of precatalysts for homogeneous catalysis. The activation of these catalysts under H_{2}, produces cyclooctane, which is usually discarded or burnt:

C_{8}H_{12} + 2 H_{2} → C_{8}H_{16}

Cyclooctane participates in no reactions except those typical of other saturated hydrocarbons: combustion and free radical halogenation. Work in 2009 on alkane functionalisation, using peroxides such as dicumyl peroxide, has opened up the chemistry to some extent, allowing for example the introduction of a phenylamino group.

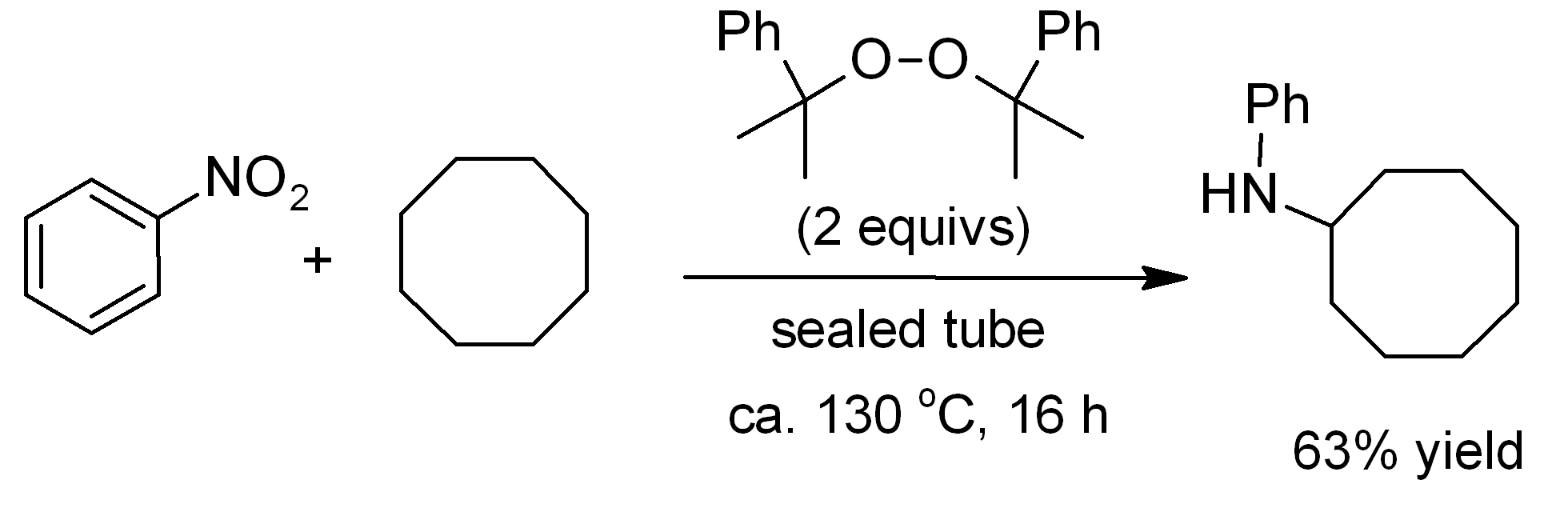
Amination of cyclooctane by nitrobenzene
