= Cyclopentadecane =

Identifiers
CAS Number	295-48-7
3D model (JSmol)	Interactive image
ChemSpider	60848
PubChem CID	67525
UNII	E3TNT8VK8L
CompTox Dashboard (EPA)	DTXSID1059781
- InChI: InChI=1S/C15H30/c1-2-4-6-8-10-12-14-15-13-11-9-7-5-3-1/h1-15H2 Key: SRONXYPFSAKOGH-UHFFFAOYSA-N
- SMILES: C1CCCCCCCCCCCCCC1

Properties
Chemical formula	C_{15}H_{30}
Molar mass	210.405 g·mol^{−1}
Appearance	white solid
Density	0.8364 g/cm^{3}
Melting point	61.3 °C (142.3 °F; 334.4 K)
Boiling point	45–60 °C (113–140 °F; 318–333 K) 5 Torr
- Except where otherwise noted, data are given for materials in their standard state (at 25 °C [77 °F], 100 kPa). Infobox references

Cyclopentadecane is the organic compound with the formula (CH_{2})_{15}. It is a fifteen-member ring hydrocarbon. The compound is a precursor to the fragrance and scent muscone by autoxidation to cyclopentadecanol.
