= Cyclohexane (data page) =

Chemical data page

This page provides supplementary chemical data on cyclohexane.

== Material Safety Data Sheet ==
The handling of this chemical may incur notable safety precautions. It is highly recommend that you seek the Material Safety Datasheet (MSDS) for this chemical from a reliable source and follow its directions.

- Sigma Aldrich
- SIRI
- Science Stuff
- Fisher Scientific

== Structure and properties ==
Structure and properties
Index of refraction, n_{D}	1.4262 at 20 °C
Abbe number	?
Dielectric constant, ε_{r}	2.023 ε_{0} at 20 °C
Bond strength	?
Bond length	230 pm H–C
Bond angle	109.5° H–C–H; 109.5 °C–C–C; 109.5° H–C–C
Magnetic susceptibility	?
Surface tension	27 dyn/cm at 10 °C; 25.3 dyn/cm at 20 °C; 15.7 dyn/cm at 80 °C
Viscosity	1.03 mPa·s at 17 °C; 0.93 mPa·s at 22 °C; 0.86 mPa·s at 27 °C; 0.75 mPa·s at 35 °C

== Thermodynamic properties ==
Phase behavior
Triple point	279.48 K (6.33 °C), 5.388 kPa
Critical point	554 K (281 °C), 4070 kPa
Std enthalpy change of fusion, Δ_{fus}H^{~~o~~}	2.68 kJ/mol crystal I → liquid
Std entropy change of fusion, Δ_{fus}S^{~~o~~}	9.57 J/(mol·K) crystal I → liquid
Std enthalpy change of vaporization, Δ_{vap}H^{~~o~~}	32 kJ/mol
Std entropy change of vaporization, Δ_{vap}S^{~~o~~}	111.80 J/(mol·K)
Solid properties
Std enthalpy change of formation, Δ_{f}H^{~~o~~}_{solid}	? kJ/mol
Standard molar entropy, S^{~~o~~}_{solid}	? J/(mol K)
Heat capacity, c_{p}	? J/(mol K)
Enthalpy of transition, Δ_{trs}H^{~~o~~}	6.7 kJ/mol at –87.0 °C crystal II → crystal I
Entropy of transition, Δ_{trs}S^{~~o~~}	36 J/(mol·K) at –87.0 °C crystal II → crystal I
Liquid properties
Std enthalpy change of formation, Δ_{f}H^{~~o~~}_{liquid}	–156.4 kJ/mol
Standard molar entropy, S^{~~o~~}_{liquid}	204 J/(mol K)
Enthalpy of combustion, Δ_{c}H^{~~o~~}	–3919.6 kJ/mol
Heat capacity, c_{p}	156 J/(mol K) or 1.85 J/(g K)
Gas properties
Std enthalpy change of formation, Δ_{f}H^{~~o~~}_{gas}	–123.1 kJ/mol
Standard molar entropy, S^{~~o~~}_{gas}	298.19 J/(mol K)
Heat capacity, c_{p}	105.3 J/(mol K)
van der Waals' constants	a = 2311 L^{2} kPa/mol^{2} b = 0.1424 liter per mole

== Vapor pressure of liquid ==
P in mm Hg	1	10	40	100	400	760	1520	3800	7600	15200	30400	45600
T in °C	–45.3_{(s)}	–15.9_{(s)}	6.7	25.5	60.8	80.7	106.0	146.4	184.0	228.4	—	—

Table data obtained from CRC Handbook of Chemistry and Physics 44th ed. The "(s)" annotation indicates equilibrium temperature of vapor over solid. Otherwise value is equilibrium temperature of vapor over liquid.

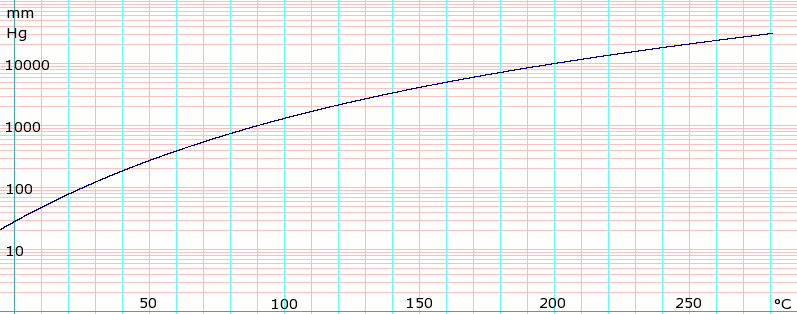
log_{10} of Cyclohexane vapor pressure. Uses formula: $\scriptstyle \log_e P_{mmHg} =$$\scriptstyle \log_e (\frac {760} {101.325}) - 9.200978\log_e(T+273.15) - \frac {6354.898} {T+273.15} + 75.65058 + 7.374814 \times 10^{-06} (T+273.15)^2$ obtained from CHERIC

== Distillation data ==
Vapor-liquid Equilibrium for Cyclohexane/Benzene; P = 760 mm Hg
BP Temp. °C	% by mole benzene
BP Temp. °C	liquid	vapor
79.5	10.1	13.1
78.9	17.1	21.1
78.4	25.6	29.3
77.8	34.3	37.6
77.5	42.8	44.5
77.4	52.5	52.9
77.4	57.1	56.4
77.6	66.5	64.5
77.9	75.9	72.8
78.2	81.0	77.7
78.6	86.3	83.4
79.3	94.5	92.6

Vapor-liquid Equilibrium for Cyclohexane/n-Hexane; P = 101.0 kPa
BP Temp. °C	% by mole n-hexane
BP Temp. °C	liquid	vapor
80.60	0.00	0.00
78.87	7.9	12.12
78.15	12.50	18.30
77.36	18.06	25.19
76.85	21.65	29.30
76.29	25.92	34.13
75.85	29.39	37.92
75.29	33.52	42.38
75.29	37.86	46.93
74.23	41.63	50.71
73.58	46.72	55.63
73.11	50.66	59.21
72.26	59.26	67.28
71.11	69.43	76.07
70.45	76.18	81.40
69.05	90.70	93.13
68.64	100.00	100.00

Vapor-liquid Equilibrium for Cyclohexane/Acetic acid P = 101.325 kPa
BP Temp. °C	% by mole acetic acid
BP Temp. °C	liquid	vapor
79.60	2.75	6.31
79.32	5.20	9.85
78.84	101.2	15.01
78.53	14.06	18.04
78.50	21.39	21.98
78.81	35.30	26.20
79.13	49.30	29.00
79.33	56.10	30.00
81.44	74.60	33.50
81.66	75.80	34.20
85.18	86.70	40.00
90.52	92.50	49.20
91.90	93.20	51.70
95.52	94.57	57.82
98.94	95.96	63.33
105.75	97.84	75.69
113.16	99.33	90.67

Vapor-liquid Equilibrium for Cyclohexane/Ethanol; P = 760 mm Hg
BP Temp. °C	% by mole ethanol
BP Temp. °C	liquid	vapor
73.99	2.0	17.5
69.08	3.0	30.2
66.94	6.5	35.8
66.08	8.1	36.3
66.37	8.6	36.5
65.59	12.5	38.8
65.23	15.1	39.6
65.12	20.6	40.8
64.93	25.8	41.5
64.87	28.3	41.8
64.84	31.5	42.6
64.78	36.6	43.0
64.77	40.3	43.1
64.77	43.1	43.1
64.78	44.4	43.8
64.81	50.0	44.3
64.88	55.7	45.5
65.01	61.3	46.0
64.99	62.1	45.8
65.25	67.8	47.5
65.56	73.8	50.5
66.03	76.3	49.6
65.93	77.6	51.5
66.40	78.1	49.8
66.90	80.9	54.5
67.26	83.3	57.8
67.98	85.3	59.5
68.86	88.1	62.3
69.44	89.8	65.3
70.11	90.9	67.8
71.42	92.9	72.5
72.48	95.1	77.8

Vapor-liquid Equilibrium for Cyclohexane/Isopropanol; P = 760 mm Hg
BP Temp. °C	% by mole cyclohexane
BP Temp. °C	liquid	vapor
78.71	2.7	11.2
76.91	7.0	21.8
74.96	11.6	28.3
74.80	12.0	27.6
72.28	19.1	37.1
70.19	30.6	48.9
69.35	47.3	55.5
69.20	51.6	57.0
69.14	51.6	57.2
69.11	51.8	56.8
68.80	52.8	58.3
69.01	53.8	58.2
69.08	57.1	58.2
69.10	70.8	62.7
69.42	74.2	64.9
69.45	78.4	66.0
69.66	80.7	67.3
70.11	86.2	69.7
70.31	87.3	70.9
71.50	92.1	77.3
74.74	97.8	85.0
76.73	99.5	89.3

== Spectral data ==
UV-Vis
λ_{max}	? nm
Extinction coefficient, ε	?
IR
Major absorption bands	1055–1000 cm^{−1}
NMR
Proton NMR
Carbon-13 NMR
Other NMR data
MS
Masses of main fragments
