= C9H16 =

The molecular formula C_{9}H_{16} (molar mass: 124.22 g/mol, exact mass: 124.1252 u) may refer to:

- Cyclononene
- Nonyne
- Hydrindane
