= Bicycloundecane =

Bicycloundecane is an organic compound with molecular formula C_{11}H_{20}. It is essentially the spherical form of the ring cycloundecane. In cycloundecane, the eleven carbon atoms are joined in a chain that meets at the ends to form a ring. In bicycloundecane, the eleven carbon atoms are arranged nearly spherically as two groups of four carbon atoms with a third group of three carbon atoms acting as a bridge. Each non-bridgehead carbon atom is attached to two hydrogen atoms making bicycloundecane a saturated compound. It is a bicycloalkane. Other related bicycloalkanes are bicyclooctane and bicyclononane.

Bicycloundecane is anisotropically conductive. It is one of several bridged hydrocarbon residues that are formed during the thermohardening of polymerizable conductive adhesives based on di(metha)acroyloxymethyl-tricyclodecane, organic peroxide, and thermoplastic resin; such adhesives have applications in electronics.
