= Cyclohexadecane =

Identifiers
| CAS Number | 295-65-8 |
| 3D model (JSmol) | Interactive image |
| ChemSpider | 60849 |
| ECHA InfoCard | 100.005.493 |
| EC Number | 206-041-2 |
| PubChem CID | 67526 |
| CompTox Dashboard (EPA) | DTXSID40183700 |
- InChI: InChI=1S/C16H32/c1-2-4-6-8-10-12-14-16-15-13-11-9-7-5-3-1/h1-16H2 Key: JJWIOXUMXIOXQN-UHFFFAOYSA-N
- SMILES: C1CCCCCCCCCCCCCCC1

Properties
| Chemical formula | C_{16}H_{32} |
| Molar mass | 224.432 g·mol^{−1} |
| Appearance | white solid |
| Density | 0.790 g/cm^{3} |
| Melting point | 60.7–61.9 °C (141.3–143.4 °F; 333.8–335.0 K) |
| Boiling point | 319 °C (606 °F; 592 K) |
- Except where otherwise noted, data are given for materials in their standard state (at 25 °C [77 °F], 100 kPa). Infobox references

Cyclohexadecane is the organic compound with the formula (CH_{2})_{16}. It is a sixteen-member ring hydrocarbon. It can be prepared from the large ring acyloin by reduction with zinc amalgam.
