= Cyclononane =

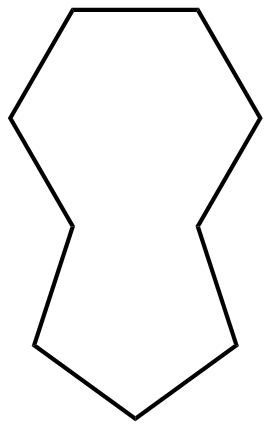

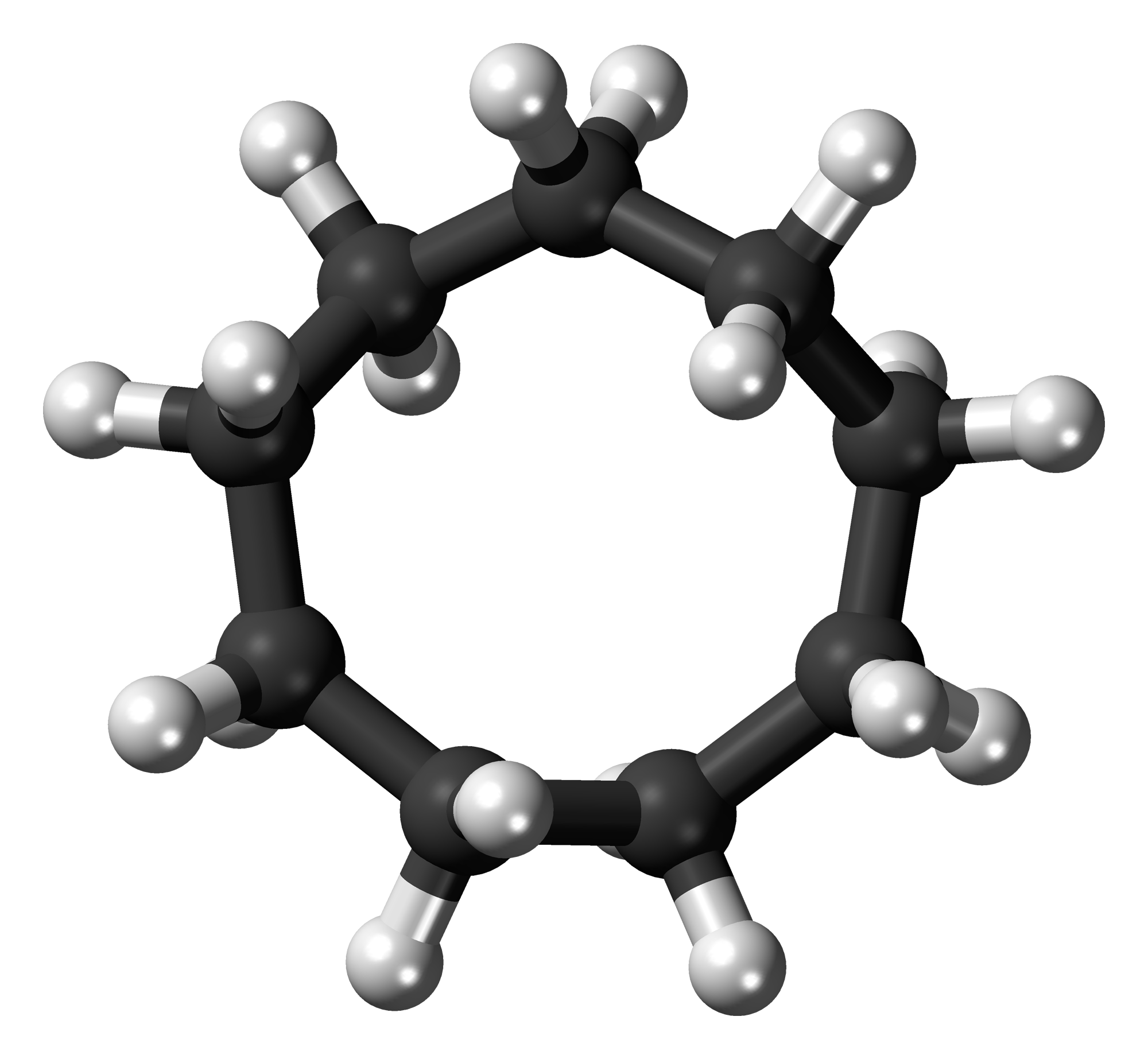

Names
- Preferred IUPAC name Cyclononane

Identifiers
| CAS Number | 293-55-0 |
| 3D model (JSmol) | Interactive image |
| ChemSpider | 119920 |
| PubChem CID | 136143 |
| UNII | VF7FY6N48Z |
| CompTox Dashboard (EPA) | DTXSID40867578 |
- InChI: InChI=1S/C9H18/c1-2-4-6-8-9-7-5-3-1/h1-9H2 Key: GPTJTTCOVDDHER-UHFFFAOYSA-N; InChI=1/C9H18/c1-2-4-6-8-9-7-5-3-1/h1-9H2 Key: GPTJTTCOVDDHER-UHFFFAOYAV
- SMILES: C1CCCCCCCC1

Properties
| Chemical formula | C_{9}H_{18} |
| Molar mass | 126.243 g·mol^{−1} |
- Except where otherwise noted, data are given for materials in their standard state (at 25 °C [77 °F], 100 kPa). verify (what is ?) Infobox references

Cyclononane is an alicyclic hydrocarbon consisting of a ring of nine carbon atoms. Its molecular formula is C_{9}H_{18}.

== Chemical properties ==
At 20 °C, cyclononane, under the action of aluminum chloride, isomerizes to propylcyclohexane, and at 50 °C to trimethylcyclohexanes.[6] On platinized carbon, cyclononane forms a mixture of indane and methylbenzene with other aromatic hydrocarbons.
