= Hydrocarbon mixtures =

Hydrocarbon mixtures are a group of various volatile, highly flammable, mixtures used chiefly as nonpolar solvents.

== Composition ==
Hydrocarbon mixtures are composed of petroleum ethers and other hydrocarbons. Petroleum ether should not be confused with the class of organic compounds called ethers; and equally, going under its alternative name of benzine, it should not be confused with benzene. (Benzine is a mixture of alkanes, such as pentane, hexane, and heptane; whereas benzene is a cyclic, aromatic hydrocarbon.)

A hydrocarbon is any chemical compound that consists only of the elements carbon (C) and hydrogen (H). They all contain a carbon frame, and have hydrogen atoms attached to the frame. Often the term is used as a shortened form of the term aliphatic hydrocarbon. Most hydrocarbons are combustible.

Petroleum ether is obtained from petroleum refineries as the portion of the distillate which is intermediate between the lighter naphtha and the heavier kerosene. It has a specific gravity of between 0.6 and 0.8 depending on its composition.
