= Cyclohexane =

Organic compound; 6-sided hydrocarbon ring

Cyclohexane
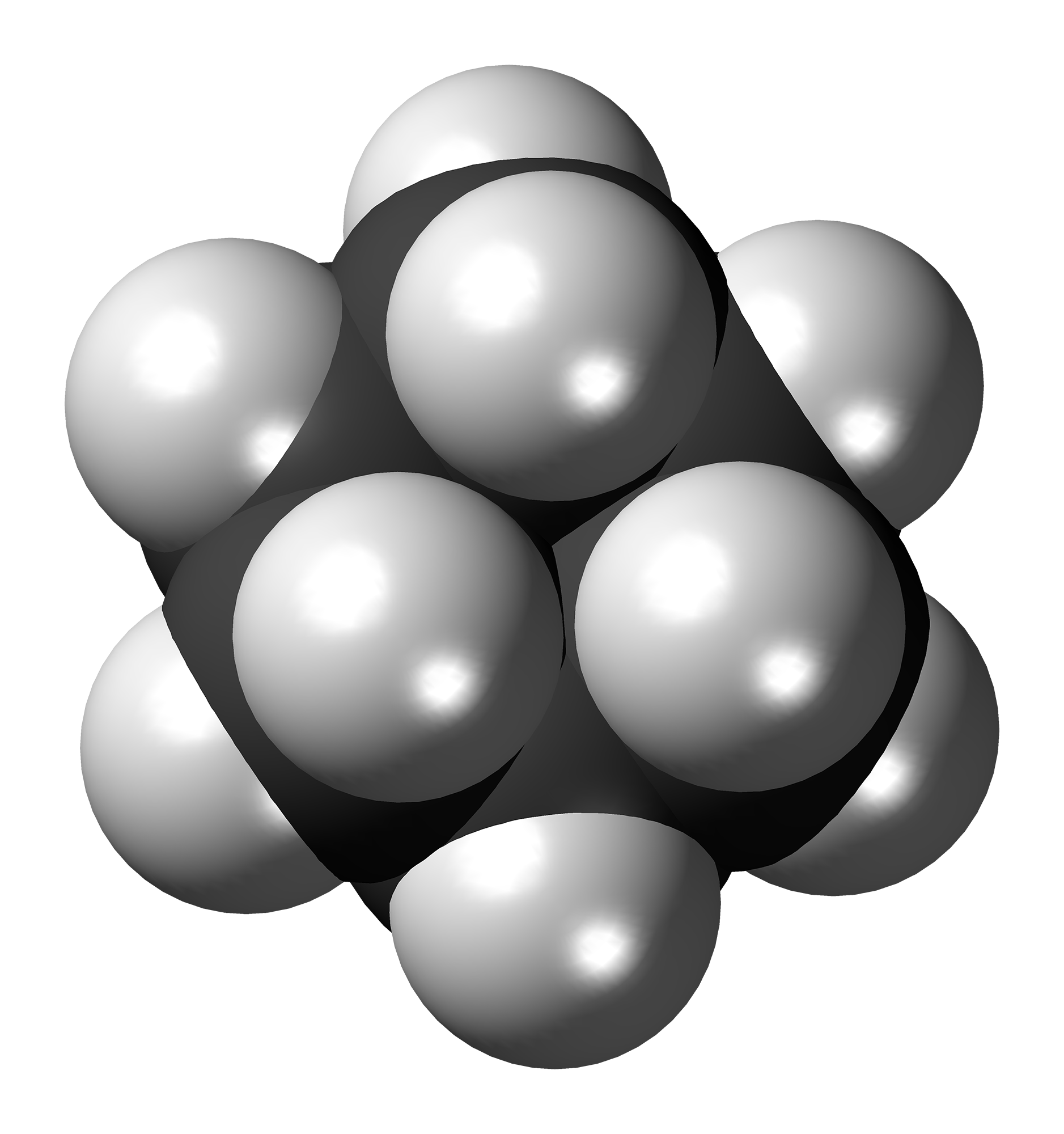
3D structure of a cyclohexane molecule
Skeletal formula of cyclohexane in its chair conformation
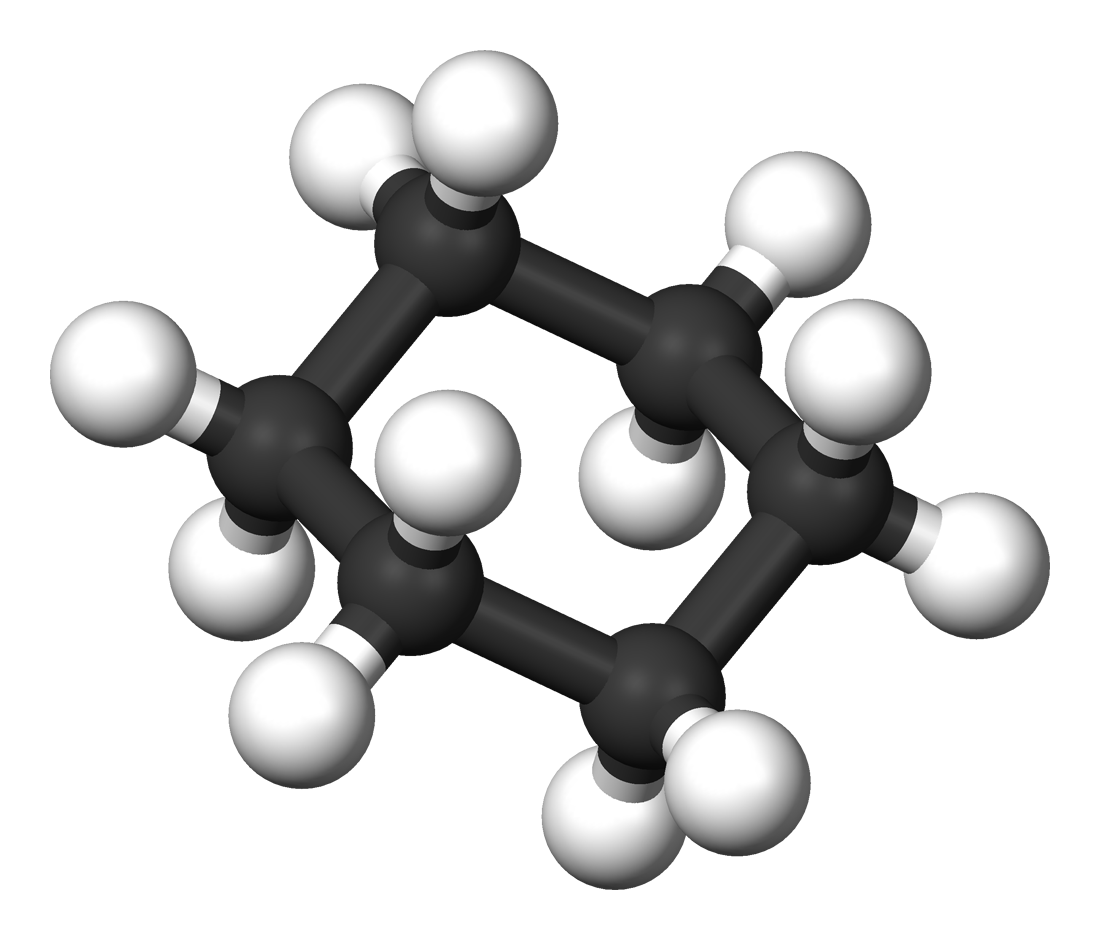
Ball-and-stick model of cyclohexane in its chair conformation

Names
- Preferred IUPAC name Cyclohexane
- Other names Hexanaphthene (archaic)

Identifiers
CAS Number	110-82-7
3D model (JSmol)	Interactive image
Beilstein Reference	1900225
ChEBI	CHEBI:29005
ChEMBL	ChEMBL15980
ChemSpider	7787
DrugBank	DB03561
ECHA InfoCard	100.003.461
Gmelin Reference	1662
KEGG	C11249
PubChem CID	8078
RTECS number	GU6300000
UNII	48K5MKG32S
UN number	1145
CompTox Dashboard (EPA)	DTXSID4021923
- InChI: InChI=1S/C6H12/c1-2-4-6-5-3-1/h1-6H2 Key: XDTMQSROBMDMFD-UHFFFAOYSA-N; InChI=1/C6H12/c1-2-4-6-5-3-1/h1-6H2 Key: XDTMQSROBMDMFD-UHFFFAOYAZ
- SMILES: C1CCCCC1

Properties
Chemical formula	C_{6}H_{12}
Molar mass	84.162 g·mol^{−1}
Appearance	Colourless liquid
Odor	Sweet, gasoline-like
Density	0.7739 g/ml (liquid); 0.996 g/ml (solid)
Melting point	6.47 °C (43.65 °F; 279.62 K)
Boiling point	80.74 °C (177.33 °F; 353.89 K)
Solubility in water	Immiscible
Solubility	Soluble in ether, alcohol, acetone
Vapor pressure	78 mmHg (20 °C)
Magnetic susceptibility (χ)	−68.13·10^{−6} cm^{3}/mol
Refractive index (n_{D})	1.42662
Viscosity	1.02 cP at 17 °C

Hazards
- GHS labelling
Pictograms	(GHS02: Flammable) (GHS08: Health hazard) (GHS07: Exclamation mark) (GHS09: Environmental hazard)
Signal word	Danger
Hazard statements	H225, H304, H315, H336
Precautionary statements	P210, P233, P240, P241, P242, P243, P261, P264, P271, P273, P280, P301+P310, P302+P352, P303+P361+P353, P304+P340, P312, P321, P331, P332+P313, P362, P370+P378, P391, P403+P233, P403+P235, P405, P501
NFPA 704 (fire diamond)	1 3 0
Flash point	−20 °C (−4 °F; 253 K)
Autoignition temperature	245 °C (473 °F; 518 K)
Explosive limits	1.3–8%
- Lethal dose or concentration (LD, LC)
LD_{50} (median dose)	12705 mg/kg (rat, oral); 813 mg/kg (mouse, oral)
LC_{Lo} (lowest published)	17,142 ppm (mouse, 2 h); 26,600 ppm (rabbit, 1 h)
- NIOSH (US health exposure limits)
PEL (Permissible)	TWA 300 ppm (1050 mg/m^{3})
REL (Recommended)	TWA 300 ppm (1050 mg/m^{3})
IDLH (Immediate danger)	1300 ppm

Thermochemistry
Std enthalpy of formation (Δ_{f}H^{⦵}_{298})	−156 kJ/mol
Std enthalpy of combustion (Δ_{c}H^{⦵}_{298})	−3920 kJ/mol

Related compounds
Related cycloalkanes	Cyclopentane; Cycloheptane
Related compounds	Cyclohexene; Benzene

Supplementary data page
- Cyclohexane (data page)
- Except where otherwise noted, data are given for materials in their standard state (at 25 °C [77 °F], 100 kPa). verify (what is ?) Infobox references

Cyclohexane is a cycloalkane with the molecular formula C_{6}H_{12}. Cyclohexane is non-polar. Cyclohexane is a colourless, flammable liquid with a distinctive detergent-like odor, reminiscent of cleaning products (in which it is sometimes used). Cyclohexane is mainly used for the industrial production of adipic acid and caprolactam, which are precursors to nylon.

Cyclohexyl (C_{6}H_{11}) is the alkyl substituent of cyclohexane and is abbreviated Cy.

== Production ==
Cyclohexane is one of the components of naphtha, from which it can be extracted by advanced distillation methods. Distillation is usually combined with isomerization of methylcyclopentane, a similar component extracted from naphtha by similar methods. Together these processes cover only a minority (15-20%) of the modern industrial demand and are complemented by synthesis.

=== Modern industrial synthesis ===
On an industrial scale, cyclohexane is produced by hydrogenation of benzene in the presence of a Raney nickel catalyst. Producers of cyclohexane account for approximately 11.4% of global demand for benzene. The reaction is highly exothermic, with ΔH(500 K) = -216.37 kJ/mol. Dehydrogenation commenced noticeably above 300 °C, reflecting the favorable entropy for dehydrogenation.

=== History of synthesis ===
Unlike benzene, cyclohexane is not found in natural resources such as coal. For this reason, early investigators synthesized their cyclohexane samples.

==== Failure ====
- In 1867 Marcellin Berthelot reduced benzene with hydroiodic acid at elevated temperatures.
- In 1870, Adolf von Baeyer repeated the reaction and pronounced the same reaction product "hexahydrobenzene".
- In 1890 Vladimir Markovnikov believed he was able to distill the same compound from Caucasus petroleum, calling his concoction "hexanaphtene".

Surprisingly, their cyclohexanes boiled higher by 10 °C than either hexahydrobenzene or hexanaphthene, but this riddle was solved in 1895 by Markovnikov, N.M. Kishner, and Nikolay Zelinsky when they reassigned "hexahydrobenzene" and "hexanaphtene" as methylcyclopentane, the result of an unexpected rearrangement reaction.

==== Success ====
In 1894, Baeyer synthesized cyclohexane starting with a ketonic decarboxylation of pimelic acid followed by multiple reductions:

In the same year, E. Haworth and W.H. Perkin Jr. (1860–1929) prepared it via a Wurtz reaction of 1,6-dibromohexane.

== Reactions and uses ==
Although rather unreactive, cyclohexane undergoes autoxidation to give a mixture of cyclohexanone and cyclohexanol. The cyclohexanone–cyclohexanol mixture, called "KA oil", is a raw material for adipic acid and caprolactam, precursors to nylon. Several million kilograms of cyclohexanone and cyclohexanol are produced annually.

It is used as a solvent in some brands of correction fluid. Cyclohexane is sometimes used as a non-polar organic solvent, although n-hexane is more widely used for this purpose. It is frequently used as a recrystallization solvent, as many organic compounds exhibit good solubility in hot cyclohexane and poor solubility at low temperatures.

Cyclohexane is also used for calibration of differential scanning calorimetry (DSC) instruments, because of a convenient crystal-crystal transition at −87.1 °C.

Cyclohexane vapour is used in vacuum carburizing furnaces, in heat treating equipment manufacture.

== Conformation ==
The 6-vertex edge ring does not conform to the shape of a perfect hexagon. The conformation of a flat 2D planar hexagon has considerable strain because the C-H bonds would be eclipsed. Therefore, to reduce torsional strain, cyclohexane adopts a three-dimensional structure known as the chair conformation, which rapidly interconvert at room temperature via a process known as a chair flip. During the chair flip, there are three other intermediate conformations that are encountered: the half-chair, which is the most unstable conformation, the more stable boat conformation, and the twist-boat, which is more stable than the boat but still much less stable than the chair. The chair and twist-boat are energy minima and are therefore conformers, while the half-chair and the boat are transition states and represent energy maxima. The idea that the chair conformation is the most stable structure for cyclohexane was first proposed as early as 1890 by Hermann Sachse, but only gained widespread acceptance much later. The new conformation puts the carbons at an angle of 109.5°. Half of the hydrogens are in the plane of the ring (equatorial) while the other half are perpendicular to the plane (axial). This conformation allows for the most stable structure of cyclohexane. Another conformation of cyclohexane exists, known as boat conformation, but it interconverts to the slightly more stable chair formation. If cyclohexane is mono-substituted with a large substituent, then the substituent will most likely be found attached in an equatorial position, as this is the slightly more stable conformation.

Cyclohexane has the lowest angle and torsional strain of all the cycloalkanes; as a result cyclohexane has been deemed a 0 in total ring strain.

=== Solid phases ===
Cyclohexane has two crystalline phases. The high-temperature phase I, stable between 186 K and the melting point 280 K, is a plastic crystal, which means the molecules retain some rotational degree of freedom. The low-temperature (below 186 K) phase II is ordered. Two other low-temperature (metastable) phases III and IV have been obtained by application of moderate pressures above 30 MPa, where phase IV appears exclusively in deuterated cyclohexane (application of pressure increases the values of all transition temperatures).

Cyclohexane phases
No	Symmetry	Space group	a (Å)	b (Å)	c (Å)	Z	T (K)	P (MPa)
I	Cubic	Fm3m	8.61			4	195	0.1
II	Monoclinic	C2/c	11.23	6.44	8.20	4	115	0.1
III	Orthorhombic	Pmnn	6.54	7.95	5.29	2	235	30
IV	Monoclinic	P12(1)/n1	6.50	7.64	5.51	4	160	37

Here Z is the number structure units per unit cell; the unit cell constants a, b and c were measured at the given temperature T and pressure P.

== See also ==
- The Flixborough disaster, a major industrial accident caused by an explosion of cyclohexane
- Hexane
- Ring flip
- Cyclohexane (data page)
