= Nonyne =

Nonynes are alkynes with one triple bond and the molecular formula C_{9}H_{16}.

The isomers are:

- 1-Nonyne
- 2-Nonyne
- 3-Nonyne
- 4-Nonyne
