= 1-Heptene =

Chemical compound (C7H14)

Names
- Preferred IUPAC name Hept-1-ene

Identifiers
CAS Number	1-heptene: 592-76-7; 2-heptene: 592-77-8; 3-heptene: 592-78-9
3D model (JSmol)	1-heptene: Interactive image; 3-heptene: Interactive image; cis-2-: Interactive image; trans-2-: Interactive image
ChemSpider	11121
ECHA InfoCard	100.008.881
EC Number	2-heptene: 209-768-3; 3-heptene: 209-769-9
PubChem CID	1-heptene: 11610; 2-heptene: 11611; 3-heptene: 11612; cis-2-: 643836; trans-2-: 639662
UNII	O748KJ11V7
UN number	2278
CompTox Dashboard (EPA)	DTXSID2060466
- InChI: 1-heptene: InChI=1S/C7H14/c1-3-5-7-6-4-2/h3H,1,4-7H2,2H3 Key: ZGEGCLOFRBLKSE-UHFFFAOYSA-N; 3-heptene: InChI=1S/C7H14/c1-3-5-7-6-4-2/h5,7H,3-4,6H2,1-2H3 Key: WZHKDGJSXCTSCK-UHFFFAOYSA-N; cis-2-: InChI=1S/C7H14/c1-3-5-7-6-4-2/h3,5H,4,6-7H2,1-2H3/b5-3- Key: OTTZHAVKAVGASB-HYXAFXHYSA-N; trans-2-: InChI=1S/C7H14/c1-3-5-7-6-4-2/h3,5H,4,6-7H2,1-2H3/b5-3+ Key: OTTZHAVKAVGASB-HWKANZROSA-N
- SMILES: 1-heptene: C=CCCCCC; 3-heptene: CCCC=CCC; cis-2-: CCCC/C=C\C; trans-2-: CCCC/C=C/C

Properties
Chemical formula	C_{7}H_{14}
Molar mass	98.189 g·mol^{−1}
Appearance	Colorless liquid
Density	0.697 g/mL
Melting point	−119 °C (−182 °F; 154 K)
Boiling point	94 °C (201 °F; 367 K)

Hazards
- GHS labelling
Pictograms	(GHS02: Flammable) (GHS08: Health hazard) (GHS09: Environmental hazard)
Signal word	Danger
Hazard statements	H225, H304, H410
Precautionary statements	P210, P233, P240, P241, P242, P243, P273, P280, P301+P310, P303+P361+P353, P331, P370+P378, P391, P403+P235, P405, P501
Flash point	−9 °C (16 °F; 264 K)
- Except where otherwise noted, data are given for materials in their standard state (at 25 °C [77 °F], 100 kPa). verify (what is ?) Infobox references

1-Heptene is an organic compound with the formula CH_{2}=CH(CH_{2})_{4}CH_{3}. It is the terminal "linear" C7 alkene. A colorless volatile liquid, it is produced as one of myriad products by the Fischer-Tropsch Process. It is used to prepare 1-octene, a common comonomer. It is classified as higher olefin, or alkene with the formula C_{7}H_{14}.

Four isomers of 1-heptene are known: cis- and trans-2-heptene as well as cis- and trans-3-heptene.

A log-lin vapor pressure chart of Heptene compared with various liquids
