= Cyclotetradecane =

Names
- Preferred IUPAC name Cyclotetradecane

Identifiers
CAS Number	295-17-0
3D model (JSmol)	Interactive image
ChEBI	CHEBI:89715
ChemSpider	60847
ECHA InfoCard	100.005.490
EC Number	206-038-6
PubChem CID	67524
UNII	O1MV54BB89
CompTox Dashboard (EPA)	DTXSID70183697
- InChI: InChI=1S/C14H28/c1-2-4-6-8-10-12-14-13-11-9-7-5-3-1/h1-14H2 Key: KATXJJSCAPBIOB-UHFFFAOYSA-N; InChI=1/C14H28/c1-2-4-6-8-10-12-14-13-11-9-7-5-3-1/h1-14H2 Key: KATXJJSCAPBIOB-UHFFFAOYAU
- SMILES: C1CCCCCCCCCCCCC1

Properties
Chemical formula	C_{14}H_{28}
Molar mass	196.378 g·mol^{−1}
Density	0.790±0.06 g/cm^{3}
Melting point	54–55 °C (129–131 °F; 327–328 K)
Boiling point	131 °C (268 °F; 404 K) 11 Torr
- Except where otherwise noted, data are given for materials in their standard state (at 25 °C [77 °F], 100 kPa). Infobox references

Cyclotetradecane is an organic compound with the chemical formula (CH_{2})_{14}. It is a simple fourteen-membered hydrocarbon.

It is known for having low strain energy.

== Occurrence ==
Cyclotetradecane has been found in black and green tea. It is produced during the pyrolysis of lignin.
