= Cyclotridecane =

Names
- Preferred IUPAC name Cyclotridecane

Identifiers
CAS Number	295-02-3
3D model (JSmol)	Interactive image
ChemSpider	119922
PubChem CID	136145
CompTox Dashboard (EPA)	DTXSID50183695
- InChI: InChI=1S/C13H26/c1-2-4-6-8-10-12-13-11-9-7-5-3-1/h1-13H2 Key: UEVXKGPJXXDGCX-UHFFFAOYSA-N; InChI=1/C13H26/c1-2-4-6-8-10-12-13-11-9-7-5-3-1/h1-13H2 Key: UEVXKGPJXXDGCX-UHFFFAOYAD
- SMILES: C1CCCCCCCCCCCC1

Properties
Chemical formula	C_{13}H_{26}
Molar mass	182.351 g·mol^{−1}
- Except where otherwise noted, data are given for materials in their standard state (at 25 °C [77 °F], 100 kPa). Infobox references

Cyclotridecane is an organic compound with the chemical formula C_{13}H_{26}. It has a molecular weight of 182.3455.

== See also ==
- Organic chemistry
