= Cycloheptane =

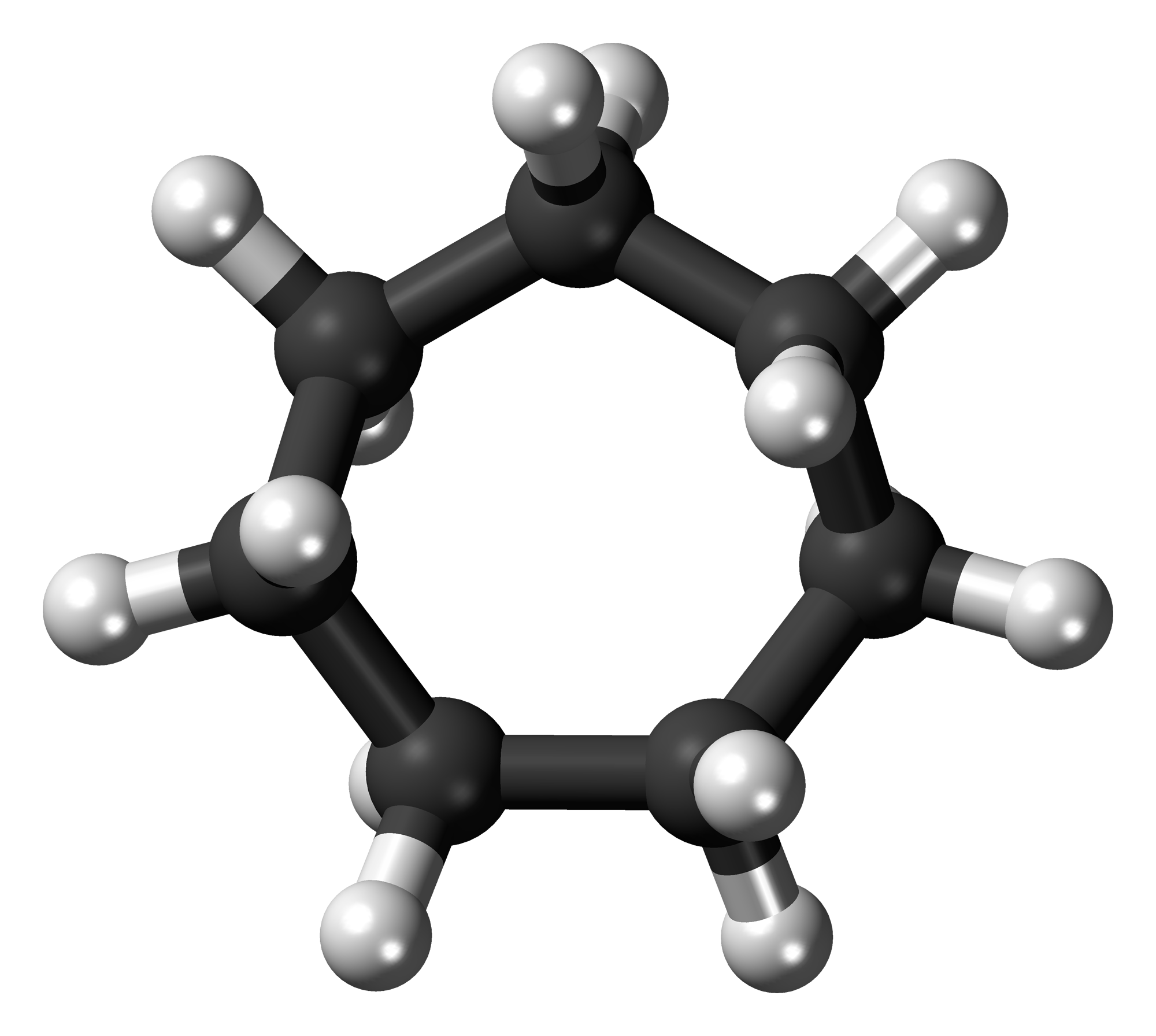

Names
- Preferred IUPAC name Cycloheptane

Identifiers
CAS Number	291-64-5
3D model (JSmol)	Interactive image
ChEMBL	ChEMBL453194
ChemSpider	8908
ECHA InfoCard	100.005.483
EC Number	206-030-2
PubChem CID	9265
UNII	VTZ53P34JA
UN number	2241
CompTox Dashboard (EPA)	DTXSID0074269
- InChI: InChI=1S/C7H14/c1-2-4-6-7-5-3-1/h1-7H2 Key: DMEGYFMYUHOHGS-UHFFFAOYSA-N; InChI=1/C7H14/c1-2-4-6-7-5-3-1/h1-7H2 Key: DMEGYFMYUHOHGS-UHFFFAOYAF
- SMILES: C1CCCCCC1

Properties
Chemical formula	C_{7}H_{14}
Molar mass	98.189 g·mol^{−1}
Appearance	colorless oily liquid
Density	0.811 g/cm^{3}
Melting point	−8 °C (18 °F; 265 K)
Boiling point	118.4 °C (245.1 °F; 391.5 K)
Critical point (T, P)	604.2 K (331.1 °C; 627.9 °F), 38.2 bar (3,820 kPa)
Solubility in water	negligible
Solubility in ethanol	Very soluble
Solubility in diethyl ether	Very soluble
Solubility in benzene	Soluble
Solubility in chloroform	Soluble
log P	4.0
Henry's law constant (k_{H})	1.1×10^{−4}
Refractive index (n_{D})	1.4436

Thermochemistry
Heat capacity (C)	liquid: 180.614 J·mol^{–1}·K^{–1}; gas: 132.0 J·mol^{–1}·K^{–1}
Std molar entropy (S^{⦵}_{298})	242.55 J·mol^{–1}·K^{–1}
Std enthalpy of formation (Δ_{f}H^{⦵}_{298})	−156.4 kJ⋅mol^{−1}
Std enthalpy of combustion (Δ_{c}H^{⦵}_{298})	−4598.9 kJ⋅mol^{−1}
Enthalpy of vaporization (Δ_{f}H_{vap})	38.5 kJ⋅mol^{−1}

Hazards
- GHS labelling
Pictograms	(GHS02: Flammable) (GHS08: Health hazard)
Signal word	Danger
Hazard statements	H225, H304
Precautionary statements	P210, P233, P240, P241, P242, P243, P280, P301+P310, P303+P361+P353, P331, P370+P378, P403+P235, P405, P501
NFPA 704 (fire diamond)	3 3 0
Flash point	6 °C (43 °F; 279 K)
Explosive limits	1.1% (lower)

Related compounds
Related cycloalkanes	Cyclohexane; Cyclooctane
- Except where otherwise noted, data are given for materials in their standard state (at 25 °C [77 °F], 100 kPa). verify (what is ?) Infobox references

Cycloheptane, also known as suberane, is an organic compound, which belongs to the group of cycloalkanes. The compound can occur in different conformers.

== Production ==
Cycloheptane occurs naturally in petroleum and can be extracted from it. It is synthesized by a Clemmensen reduction from cycloheptanone.

== Properties ==
Cycloheptane is a colorless liquid with a mild, aromatic odor. According to the Antoine equation, the vapor pressure function is given by log_{10}(P) = A−B/(T+C) (P in bar, T in kelvins) with A = 3.97710, B = 1330.402 and C = −56.946 in the temperature range from 341.3 to 432.2 K (68.2 to 159.1 °C; 154.7 to 318.3 °F).

In the solid phase, cycloheptane occurs in four polymorphic forms. The transformation temperatures for the conversion from form IV to form III are 138 °C (280 °F), from form III to form II −75 °C (−103 °F) and from form II to form I −61 °C (−78 °F). Form I melts at −8 °C (18 °F).

Summary of the most important thermodynamic properties (not in chembox)
Property	Type	Value [Unit]	Note
Triple point	T_{triple}	265.12 K (−8.03 °C; 17.55 °F)	
Critical volume	V_{c}	0.53 L/mol	
Critical density	ρ_{c}	2.83 mol/L	

=== Chemical properties ===
Cycloheptane can be thermally rearranged to methylcyclohexane in the presence of aluminum trichloride.

Functionalization can be achieved by chlorination with N-chlorosuccinimide.

The compound is flammable and forms flammable vapour-air mixtures with air.

== Conformation ==
Cycloheptane is not a flat molecule, because that would give C-C-C bond angles much greater than the tetrahedral angle of around 109.5°. Instead it is puckered and three-dimensional. One can ask the question of what conformations would have the same angle everywhere (near 109.5°) and all bond lengths equal. If we think of an open chain of seven bonds, there are five dihedral angles that can be chosen, for the sequences (1,2,3,4), (2,3,4,5), and so on. The last bond though should end where the first began, and should form the correct angle with the first bond. This imposes four constraints, but we have five dihedral angles to play with, so there is one degree of freedom. It turns out that there are two continua of solutions. One is a circular series of fourteen "boat" conformations interspersed with "twist-boat" conformations, and the other is a circular series of fourteen "chair" conformations interspersed with "twist-chair" conformations. The boat and chair conformations have mirror symmetry, while the twist-boat and twist-chair have two-fold rotational symmetry. Conformations between boat and twist-boat or between chair and twist-chair have no symmetry. The passage along the continuum boat→twist-boat→boat→twist-boat→boat constitutes a pseudorotation, as does chair→twist-chair→chair→twist-chair→chair.

== Uses ==
Cycloheptane can be used as a non-polar solvent. In organic synthesis, the cycloheptyl functional groups can be introduced into organic molecules, e.g. pharmaceutical active ingredients, after functionalization.

== Hazards ==
An irritating effect on the eyes and respiratory tract is mentioned in the literature. The toxic effect is more comparable to that of methylcyclohexane, which only slightly irritates the mucous membranes. Animal experiments showed only a slight irritating effect on the skin. Systemically, cycloheptane has a depressant effect on the central nervous system.
