= Cyclodecane =

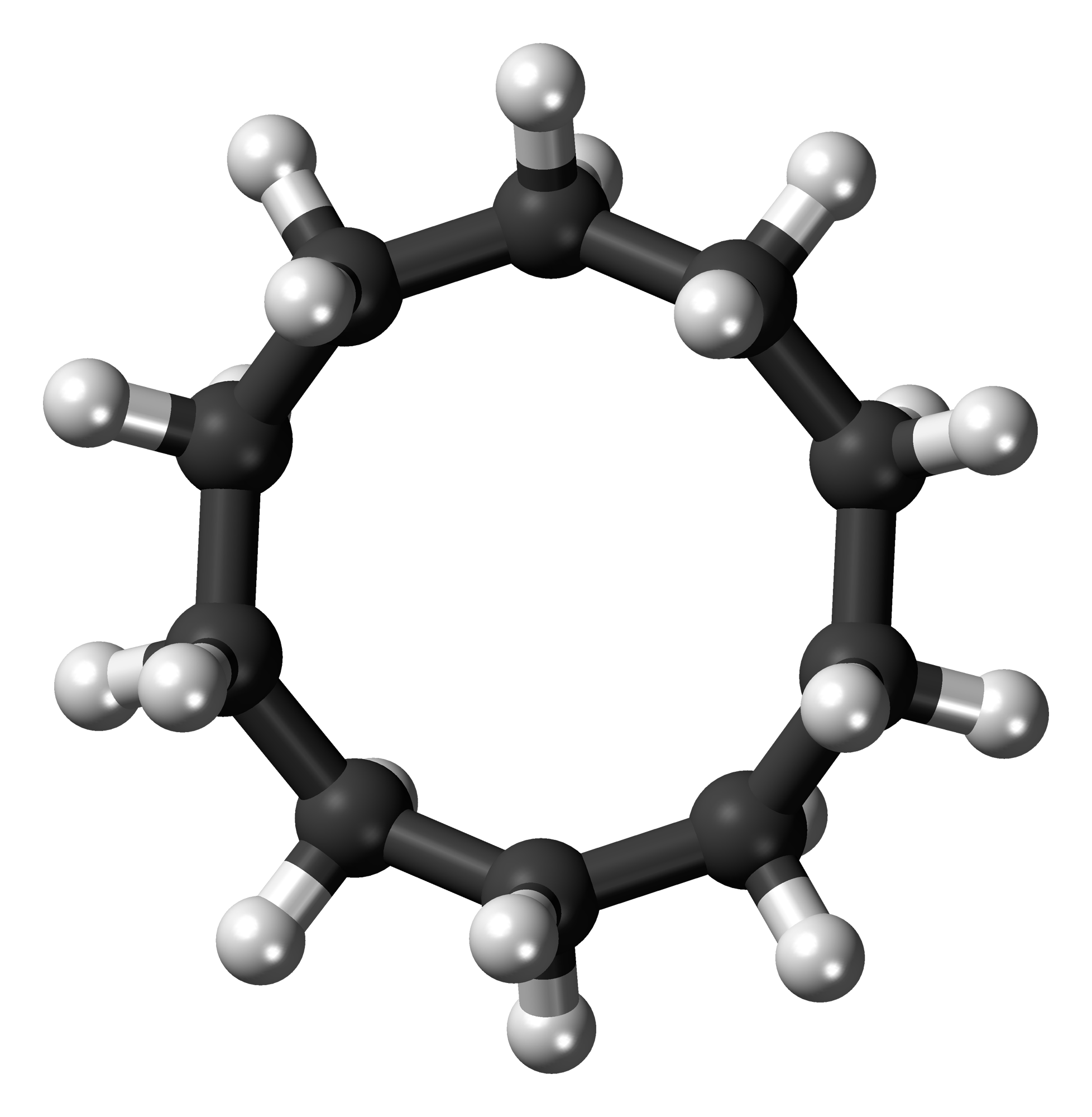

Names
- Preferred IUPAC name Cyclodecane

Identifiers
CAS Number	293-96-9
3D model (JSmol)	Interactive image
ChemSpider	8910
ECHA InfoCard	100.005.485
PubChem CID	9267
UNII	9N3JJ4GTR5
CompTox Dashboard (EPA)	DTXSID7059779
- InChI: InChI=1S/C10H20/c1-2-4-6-8-10-9-7-5-3-1/h1-10H2 Key: LMGZGXSXHCMSAA-UHFFFAOYSA-N; InChI=1/C10H20/c1-2-4-6-8-10-9-7-5-3-1/h1-10H2 Key: LMGZGXSXHCMSAA-UHFFFAOYAE
- SMILES: C1CCCCCCCCC1

Properties
Chemical formula	C_{10}H_{20}
Molar mass	140.27 g/mol
Appearance	colorless liquid
Density	0.871 g/cm^{3}
Melting point	9 to 10 °C (48 to 50 °F; 282 to 283 K)
Boiling point	201 °C (394 °F; 474 K)

Hazards
Flash point	65 °C (149 °F; 338 K)
- Except where otherwise noted, data are given for materials in their standard state (at 25 °C [77 °F], 100 kPa). verify (what is ?) Infobox references

Cyclodecane is a cycloalkane with the chemical formula C_{10}H_{20}.
