= Cycloundecane =

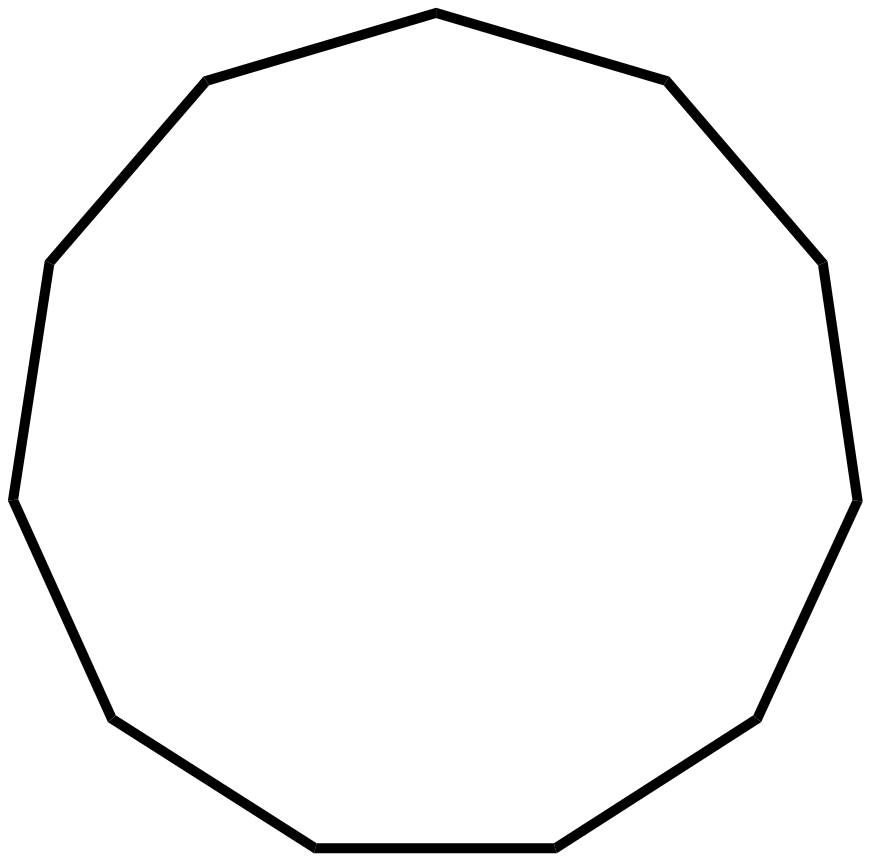

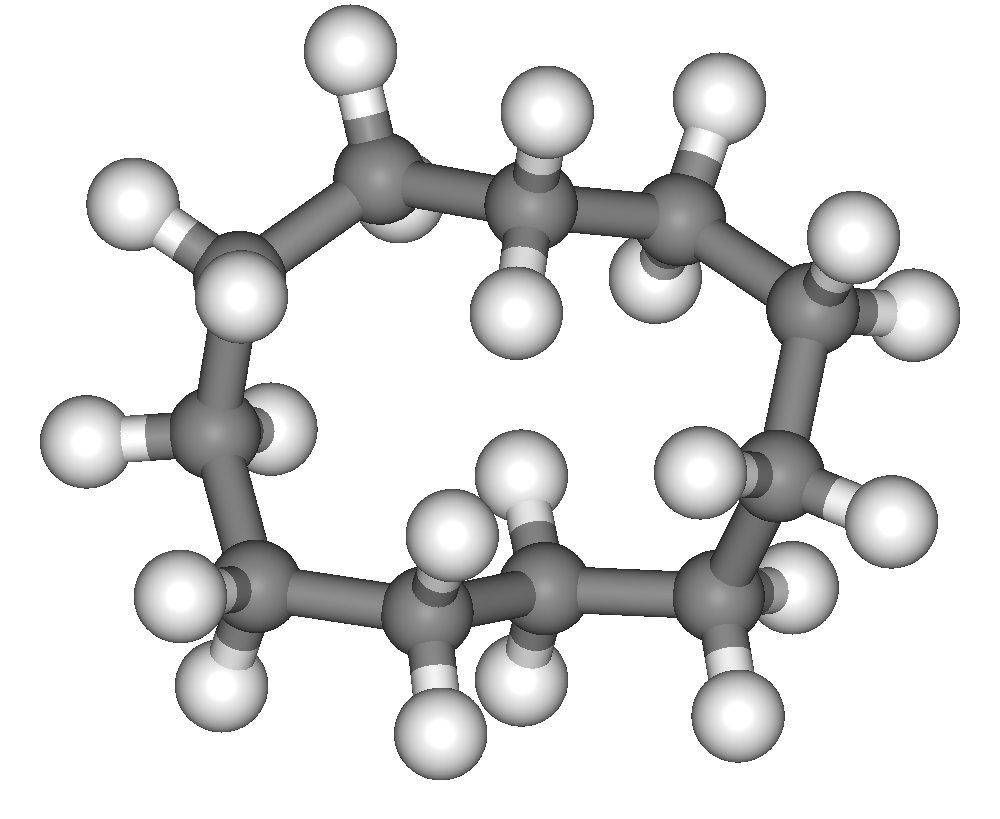

Names
- Preferred IUPAC name Cycloundecane

Identifiers
| CAS Number | 294-41-7 |
| 3D model (JSmol) | Interactive image |
| ChemSpider | 119921 |
| PubChem CID | 136144 |
| UNII | J5S7AK66JC |
| CompTox Dashboard (EPA) | DTXSID00183620 |
- InChI: InChI=1S/C11H22/c1-2-4-6-8-10-11-9-7-5-3-1/h1-11H2 Key: KYTNZWVKKKJXFS-UHFFFAOYSA-N; InChI=1/C11H22/c1-2-4-6-8-10-11-9-7-5-3-1/h1-11H2 Key: KYTNZWVKKKJXFS-UHFFFAOYAG
- SMILES: C1CCCCCCCCCC1

Properties
| Chemical formula | C_{11}H_{22} |
| Molar mass | 154.29 g/mol |
- Except where otherwise noted, data are given for materials in their standard state (at 25 °C [77 °F], 100 kPa). verify (what is ?) Infobox references

Cycloundecane is a saturated cyclic organic compound with eleven carbon atoms forming a ring. It is classed as an alkane because it has only carbon and hydrogen and these elements are configured with C–H and C–C such that there is a chain of carbon atoms with hydrogens attached to them. For each of the carbon atoms in the chain there is a pair of hydrogen atoms such that the chemical formula is C_{11}H_{22}. The compound is stable, but it burns with sufficient ignition heat.

Variants of this compound, for example, bicycloundecane, have been proposed for use in conductors for electronic circuitry.
