= 1,2-Dimethylcyclopropane =

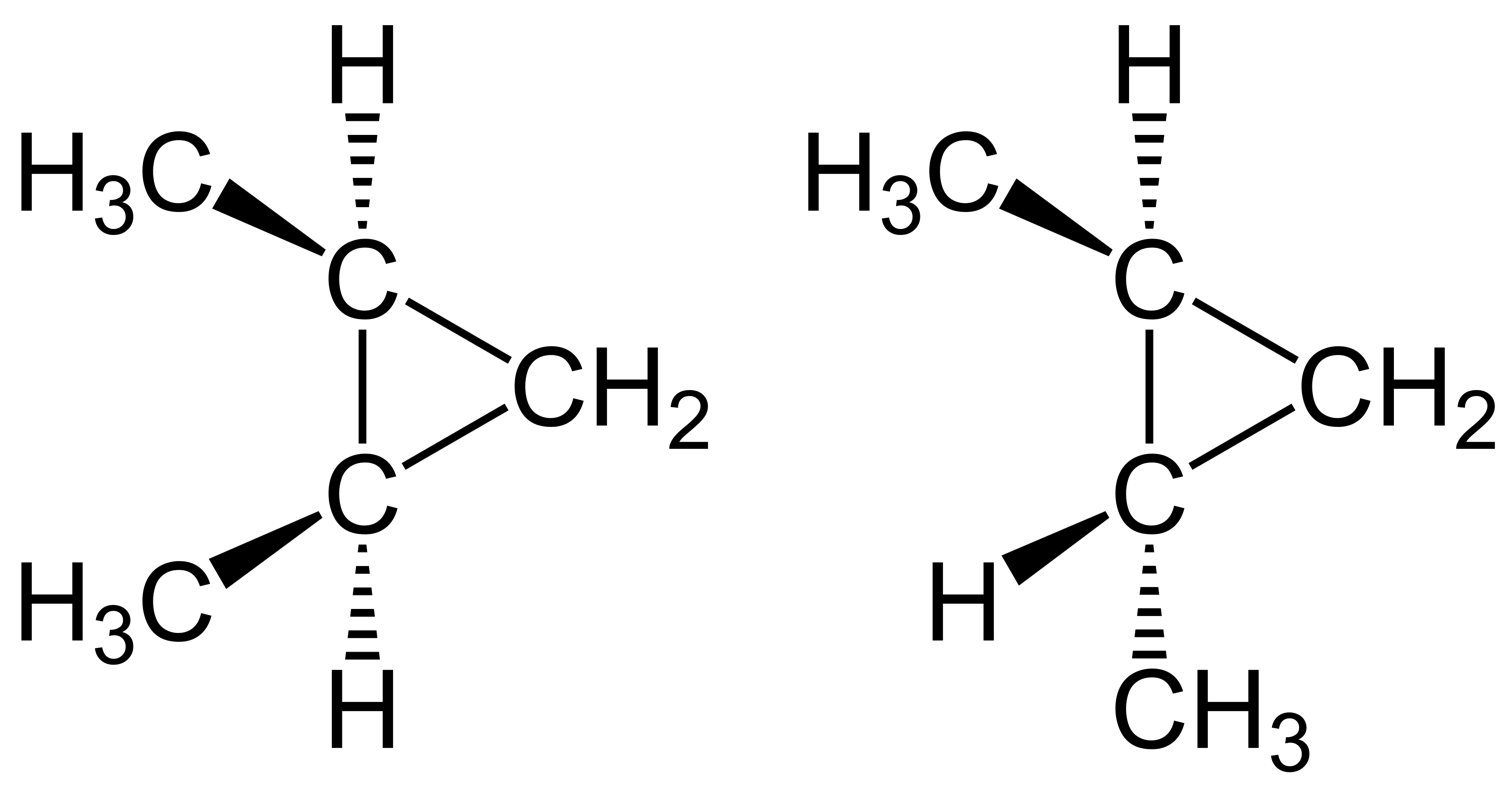
- cis (left) and (S,S)-trans (right) isomers

Names
- Preferred IUPAC name 1,2-Dimethylcyclopropane

Identifiers
CAS Number	2511-95-7
3D model (JSmol)	Interactive image
ChemSpider	92890
PubChem CID	102832
CompTox Dashboard (EPA)	DTXSID00870801
- InChI: InChI=1S/C5H10/c1-4-3-5(4)2/h4-5H,3H2,1-2H3 Key: VKJLDXGFBJBTRQ-UHFFFAOYSA-N; InChI=1/C5H10/c1-4-3-5(4)2/h4-5H,3H2,1-2H3 Key: VKJLDXGFBJBTRQ-UHFFFAOYAK
- SMILES: CC1CC1C

Properties
Chemical formula	C_{5}H_{10}
Molar mass	70.135 g·mol^{−1}
Density	cis: 0.6889 g/cm^{3} trans: 0.6648 g/cm^{3}
Melting point	cis: −140 °C trans: −149.6 °C
Boiling point	cis: 37 °C trans: 28.2 °C
Refractive index (n_{D})	cis: 1.3829 (20 °C) trans: 1.3713 (20 °C)

Related compounds
Related compounds	cyclopropane, cyclopentane
- Except where otherwise noted, data are given for materials in their standard state (at 25 °C [77 °F], 100 kPa). verify (what is ?) Infobox references

1,2-Dimethylcyclopropane is a cycloalkane consisting of a cyclopropane ring substituted with two methyl groups attached to adjacent carbon atoms. It has three stereoisomers, one cis-isomer and a pair of trans-enantiomers, which differ depending on the orientation of the two methyl groups. As with other cyclopropanes, ring tension results in a relatively unstable compound.

1,2-Dimethylcyclopropane is 1 of 10 structural isomers (cycloalkanes and aliphatic alkenes) which share the general formula of C_{5}H_{10}, the others being cyclopentane, methylcyclobutane, 1,1-dimethylcyclopropane, ethylcyclopropane, 1-pentene, 2-pentene, 2-methyl-1-butene, 3-methyl-1-butene, and 2-methyl-2-butene.

== See also ==
- Alkyl cycloalkane
