= C4F6 =

The molecular formula C_{4}F_{6} (molar mass: 162.0 g/mol, exact mass: 161.9904 u) may refer to:

- Hexafluorobutadiene
- Hexafluorocyclobutene
- Hexafluoro-2-butyne
