= C5H10 =

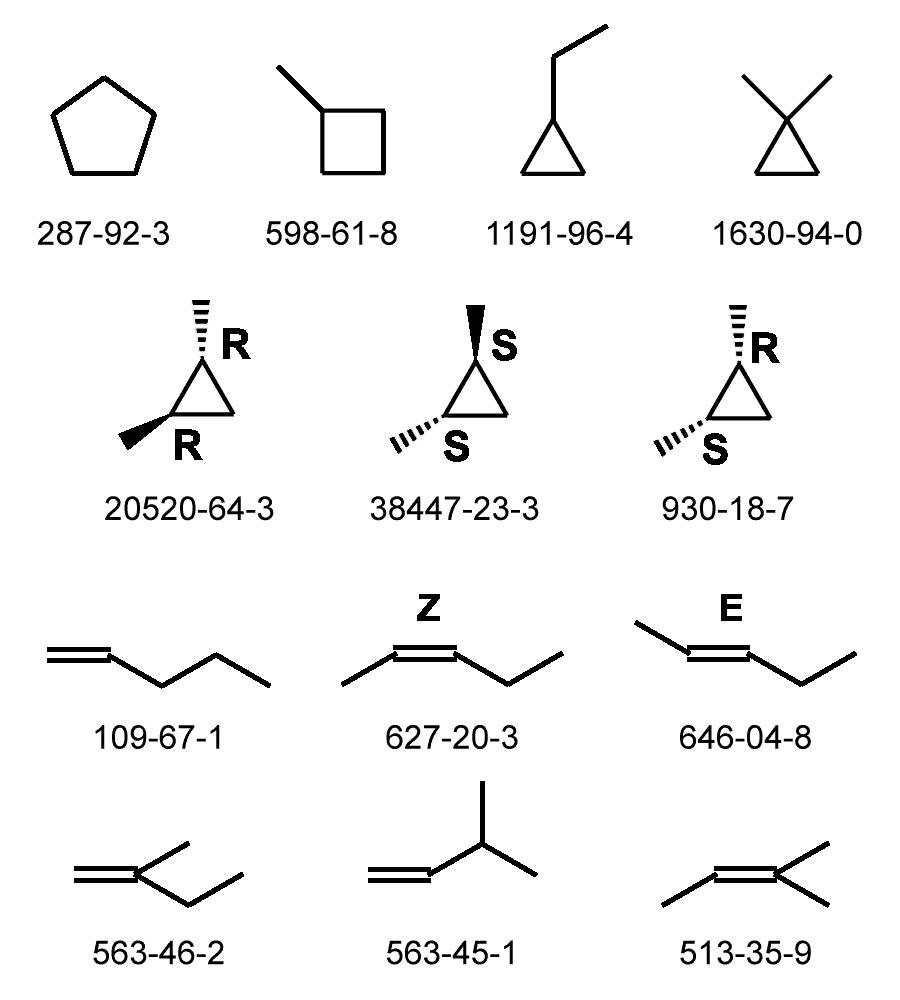
Isomers with the molecular formula C_{5}H_{10} with CAS numbers

C_{5}H_{10} is the molecular formula of 13 hydrocarbon isomers (represented by their CAS numbers on the chart). They can be divided into cycloalkanes and alkenes.

== Cycloalkanes ==
- Cyclopentane (CAS 287-92-3)
- Methylcyclobutane (CAS 598-61-8)
- Cyclopropanes
  - Ethylcyclopropane (CAS 1191-96-4)
  - 1,1-Dimethylcyclopropane (CAS 1630-94-0)
  - (R,R)-1,2-dimethylcyclopropane or (1R-trans)-1,2-dimethylcyclopropane (CAS 20520-64-3)
  - (S,S)-1,2-Dimethylcyclopropane or (1S-trans)-1,2-dimethylcyclopropane (CAS 38447-23-3)
  - (R,S)-1,2-Dimethylcyclopropane or cis-1,2-dimethylcyclopropane (CAS 930-18-7)

== Alkenes ==
- Pentenes
  - 1-Pentene (CAS 109-67-1)
  - cis-2-Pentene (CAS 627-20-3)
  - trans-2-pentene (CAS 646-04-8)
- Butenes
  - 2-Methyl-1-butene (CAS 563-46-2)
  - 3-Methyl-1-butene (CAS 563-45-1)
  - 2-Methyl-2-butene (CAS 513-35-9)
