= Alkyl cycloalkane =

Class of chemical compounds

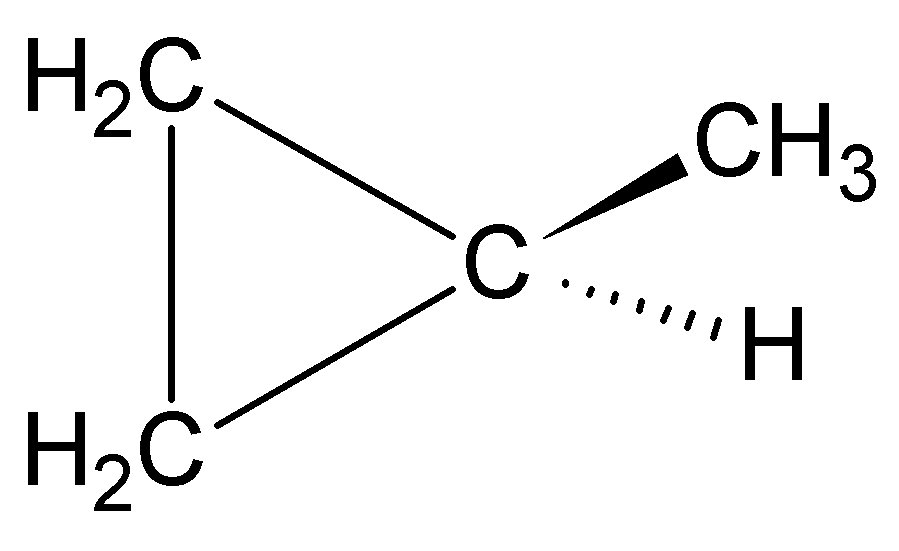
Methylcyclopropane, the simplest alkyl cycloalkane.

Alkyl cycloalkanes are chemical compounds with an alkyl group with a single ring of carbons to which hydrogens are attached according to the formula

C_{n}H_{2n}.

They are named analogously to their normal alkane counterpart of the same carbon count: methylcyclopropane, methylcyclobutane, methylcyclopentane, methylcyclohexane, etc.

Methylcycloalkanes are classed into compounds with small, normal and bigger cycloalkanes, where cyclopropane and cyclobutane are the small ones, cyclopentane, cyclohexane, cycloheptane are the normal ones and the rest are the bigger ones.

== Nomenclature ==
The naming of polycyclic alkanes is more complex, with the base name indicating the number of carbons in the ring system, a prefix indicating the number of rings (e.g., "bicyclo"), and a numeric prefix before that indicating the number of carbons in each part of each ring, exclusive of vertices. For instance, a bicyclooctane which consists of a six-member ring and a four-member ring, which share two adjacent carbon atoms which form a shared edge, is [4.2.0]-bicyclooctane. That part of the six-member ring, exclusive of the shared edge has 4 carbons. That part of the four-member ring, exclusive of the shared edge, has 2 carbons. The edge itself, exclusive of the two vertices that define it, has 0 carbons.

== Reactions ==
The normal and the bigger alkylcycloalkanes are very stable like alkanes and their reactions (cf. radicalic chain reactions) are like alkanes.

The small alkylcycloalkanes - particularly alkylcyclopropane - has a lower stability due to the Bayer tension. They react similar to alkenes, though they don't react with the EA (cf. electrophilic addition), but with the SN2 (cf. nucleophilic substitution) reaction mechanism. These reactions are both ring opening reactions and cleavage reactions.

== Typical compound ==
The typical compound of the group alkyl cycloalkanes is methylcyclopropane.
