= List of UN numbers 2401 to 2500 =

UN numbers from UN2401 to UN2500 as assigned by the United Nations Committee of Experts on the Transport of Dangerous Goods are as follows:

== UN 2401 to UN 2500 ==
UN Number	Class	Proper Shipping Name
UN 2401	8	Piperidine
UN 2402	3	Propanethiols
UN 2403	3	Isopropenyl acetate
UN 2404	3	Propionitrile
UN 2405	3	Isopropyl butyrate
UN 2406	3	Isopropyl isobutyrate
UN 2407	6.1	Isopropyl chloroformate
UN 2408	?	(UN No. no longer in use) Isopropyl formate (UN No. no longer in use)
UN 2409	3	Isopropyl propionate
UN 2410	3	1,2,3,6-Tetrahydropyridine
UN 2411	3	Butyronitrile
UN 2412	3	Tetrahydrothiophene
UN 2413	3	Tetrapropylorthotitanate
UN 2414	3	Thiophene
UN 2415	?	(UN No. no longer in use)
UN 2416	3	Trimethyl borate
UN 2417	2	Carbonyl fluoride, compressed
UN 2418	2	Sulfur tetrafluoride
UN 2419	2	Bromotrifluoroethylene
UN 2420	2	Hexafluoroacetone
UN 2421	2	Nitrogen trioxide
UN 2422	2	Octafluorobut-2-ene or Refrigerant gas R 1318
UN 2423	-	(UN No. no longer in use)
UN 2424	2	Octafluoropropane or Refrigerant gas R 218
UN 2425	-	(UN No. no longer in use)
UN 2426	5.1	Ammonium nitrate, liquid (hot concentrated solution)
UN 2427	5.1	Potassium chlorate, aqueous solution
UN 2428	5.1	Sodium chlorate, aqueous solution
UN 2429	5.1	Calcium chlorate aqueous solution
UN 2430	8	Alkylphenols, solid, n.o.s. (including C2-C12 homologues)
UN 2431	6.1	Anisidines
UN 2432	6.1	N,N-Diethylaniline
UN 2433	6.1	Chloronitrotoluenes liquid or Chloronitrotoluenes solid
UN 2434	8	Dibenzyldichlorosilane
UN 2435	8	Ethylphenyldichlorosilane
UN 2436	3	Thioacetic acid
UN 2437	8	Methylphenyldichlorosilane
UN 2438	6.1	Trimethylacetyl chloride
UN 2439	8	Sodium hydrogendifluoride, solid or Sodium hydrogendifluoride, solution
UN 2440	8	Stannic chloride, pentahydrate
UN 2441	4.2	Titanium trichloride, pyrophoric or Titanium trichloride mixtures, pyrophoric
UN 2442	8	Trichloroacetyl chloride
UN 2443	8	Vanadium oxytrichloride
UN 2444	8	Vanadium tetrachloride
UN 2445	4.2	(UN No. no longer in use) Lithium alkyls (UN No. no longer in use)
UN 2446	6.1	Nitrocresols
UN 2447	4.2	Phosphorus white, molten
UN 2448	4.1	Sulfur, molten
UN 2449	?	(UN No. no longer in use) Oxalates (UN No. no longer in use)
UN 2450	?	(UN No. no longer in use)
UN 2451	2	Nitrogen trifluoride, compressed
UN 2452	2	Ethylacetylene, inhibited
UN 2453	2	Ethyl fluoride or Refrigerant gas R 161
UN 2454	2	Methyl fluoride, or Refrigerant gas R 41
UN 2455	2	Methyl nitrite
UN 2456	3	2-Chloropropene
UN 2457	3	2,3-Dimethylbutane
UN 2458	3	Hexadienes
UN 2459	3	2-Methyl-1-butene
UN 2460	3	2-Methyl-2-butene
UN 2461	3	Methylpentadienes
UN 2462	?	(UN No. no longer in use) Methyl pentanes (UN No. no longer in use)
UN 2463	4.3	Aluminum hydride
UN 2464	5.1	Beryllium nitrate
UN 2465	5.1	Dichloroisocyanuric acid, dry or Dichloroisocyanuric acid salts
UN 2466	5.1	Potassium superoxide
UN 2467	?	(UN No. no longer in use) Sodium percarbonates (UN No. no longer in use)
UN 2468	5.1	Trichloroisocyanuric acid, dry
UN 2469	5.1	Zinc bromate
UN 2470	6.1	Phenylacetonitrile, liquid
UN 2471	6.1	Osmium tetroxide
UN 2472	?	(UN No. no longer in use) Pindone (UN No. no longer in use)
UN 2473	6.1	Sodium arsanilate
UN 2474	6.1	Thiophosgene
UN 2475	8	Vanadium trichloride
UN 2476	?	(UN No. no longer in use) Warfarin (UN No. no longer in use)
UN 2477	6.1	Methyl isothiocyanate
UN 2478	3	Isocyanates, flammable, toxic, n.o.s. or Isocyanate solutions, flammable, toxic, n.o.s. flashpoint less than 23 °C
UN 2479	?	(UN No. no longer in use)
UN 2480	6.1	Methyl isocyanate
UN 2481	3	Ethyl isocyanate
UN 2482	6.1	n-Propyl isocyanate
UN 2483	3	Isopropyl isocyanate
UN 2484	6.1	tert-Butyl isocyanate
UN 2485	6.1	n-Butyl isocyanate
UN 2486	3	Isobutyl isocyanate
UN 2487	6.1	Phenyl isocyanate
UN 2488	6.1	Cyclohexyl isocyanate
UN 2489	?	(UN No. no longer in use) Diphenylmethane-4,4´-diisocyanate (UN No. no longer in use)
UN 2490	6.1	Dichlorodiisopropyl ether
UN 2491	8	Ethanolamine or Ethanolamine solutions
UN 2492	?	(UN No. no longer in use)
UN 2493	3	Hexamethyleneimine
UN 2494	?	(UN No. no longer in use)
UN 2495	5.1	Iodine pentafluoride
UN 2496	8	Propionic anhydride
UN 2497	?	(UN No. no longer in use) Sodium phenolate, solid (UN No. no longer in use)
UN 2498	3	1,2,3,6-Tetrahydrobenzaldehyde
UN 2499 to 2500	?	(UN No.s no longer in use)

== See also ==
- Lists of UN numbers
