= Cyclobutene =

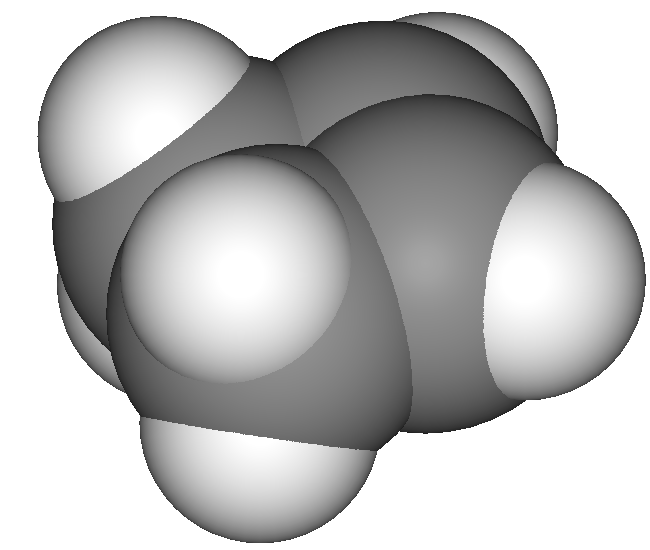

Names
- Preferred IUPAC name Cyclobutene

Identifiers
CAS Number	822-35-5
3D model (JSmol)	Interactive image
ChEBI	CHEBI:51206
ChemSpider	63164
ECHA InfoCard	100.011.360
EC Number	212-496-8
PubChem CID	69972
CompTox Dashboard (EPA)	DTXSID60231616
- InChI: InChI=1S/C4H6/c1-2-4-3-1/h1-2H,3-4H2 Key: CFBGXYDUODCMNS-UHFFFAOYSA-N; InChI=1/C4H6/c1-2-4-3-1/h1-2H,3-4H2 Key: CFBGXYDUODCMNS-UHFFFAOYAN
- SMILES: C\1=C\CC/1

Properties
Chemical formula	C_{4}H_{6}
Molar mass	54.092 g·mol^{−1}
Appearance	Colorless gas
Density	0.733 g/cm^{3}
Boiling point	2 °C (36 °F; 275 K)
- Except where otherwise noted, data are given for materials in their standard state (at 25 °C [77 °F], 100 kPa). verify (what is ?) Infobox references

Cyclobutene is an organic compound with the chemical formula C_{4}H_{6}. It is a cycloalkene. It is a colorless gas that easily condenses. It is of interest in research but currently has no practical applications. A modern synthesis involves the 2-step dehydration of cyclobutanol. The compound was first prepared by thermolysis of the ammonium salt [C_{4}H_{7}N(CH_{3})_{3}]OH (cyclobutyltrimethylammonium hydroxide).

Cyclobutene thermally isomerizes to 1,3-butadiene. This strongly exothermic reaction reflects the dominance of ring strain. In contrast, the corresponding equilibrium for hexafluorocyclobutene disfavors hexafluorobutadiene.

== See also ==
- Cyclobutane
- Cyclobutadiene
- Cyclobutyne
- Squaric acid
