= Hexachlorobutadiene =

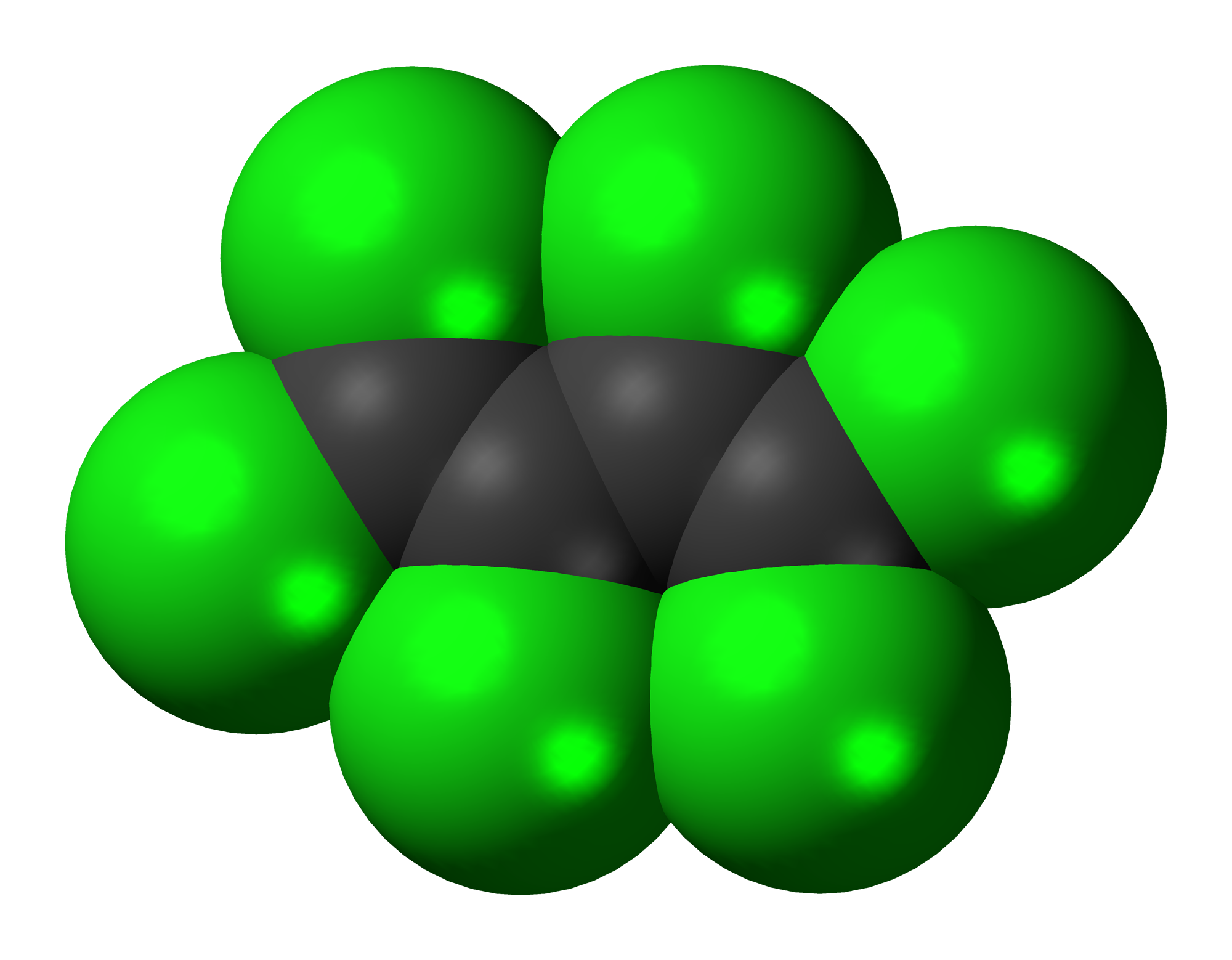

Names
- IUPAC name Hexachloro-1,3-butadiene
- Other names HCBD, HCDB, Perchlorobutadiene, perchloro-1,3-butadiene, tripen

Identifiers
CAS Number	87-68-3
3D model (JSmol)	Interactive image
ChEMBL	ChEMBL389950
ChemSpider	6635
ECHA InfoCard	100.001.605
KEGG	C11091
PubChem CID	6901
UNII	CQ8AAO9MO1
CompTox Dashboard (EPA)	DTXSID7020683
- InChI: InChI=1S/C4Cl6/c5-1(3(7)8)2(6)4(9)10 Key: RWNKSTSCBHKHTB-UHFFFAOYSA-N; InChI=1/C4Cl6/c5-1(3(7)8)2(6)4(9)10 Key: RWNKSTSCBHKHTB-UHFFFAOYAT
- SMILES: Cl/C(Cl)=C(\Cl)C(\Cl)=C(/Cl)Cl

Properties
Chemical formula	C_{4}Cl_{6}
Molar mass	260.74 g·mol^{−1}
Appearance	Colorless liquid
Odor	Mild, turpentine-like
Density	1.665 g/mL at 25 °C
Melting point	−22 – −19 °C (−8 – −2 °F; 251–254 K)
Boiling point	210–220 °C (410–428 °F; 483–493 K)
Solubility in water	Insoluble
Vapor pressure	0.2 mmHg (20 °C)

Hazards
- NIOSH (US health exposure limits)
PEL (Permissible)	none
REL (Recommended)	Ca TWA 0.02 ppm (0.24 mg/m^{3}) [skin]
IDLH (Immediate danger)	Ca [N.D.]
Safety data sheet (SDS)	Sigma Aldrich

Hazards
NFPA 704 (fire diamond)	3 1 0
- Except where otherwise noted, data are given for materials in their standard state (at 25 °C [77 °F], 100 kPa). verify (what is ?) Infobox references

Hexachlorobutadiene, (often abbreviated as "HCBD") Cl_{2}C=C(Cl)C(Cl)=CCl_{2}, is a colorless liquid at room temperature that has an odor similar to that of turpentine. It is a chlorinated aliphatic diene with niche applications but is most commonly used as a solvent for other chlorine-containing compounds. Structurally, it has a 1,3-butadiene core, but fully substituted with chlorine atoms.

== Synthesis ==
Hexachlorobutadiene is primarily produced in chlorinolysis plants as a by-product in the production of carbon tetrachloride and tetrachloroethylene. Chlorinolysis is a radical chain reaction that occurs when hydrocarbons are exposed to chlorine gas under pyrolytic conditions. The hydrocarbon is chlorinated and the resulting chlorocarbons are broken down. This process is analogous to combustion, but with chlorine instead of oxygen.

Hexachlorobutadiene occurs as a by-product during the chlorinolysis of butane derivatives in the production of both carbon tetrachloride and tetrachloroethylene. These two commodities are manufactured on such a large scale, that enough HCBD can generally be obtained to meet the industrial demand. Alternatively, hexachlorobutadiene can be directly synthesized via the chlorination of butane or butadiene.

== Reactivity ==
The products of chlorinolysis reactions heavily depend upon both the temperature and pressure under which the reaction occurs. Thus, by adjusting these reaction conditions in the presence of chlorine gas, hexachlorobutadiene can be even further chlorinated to give tetrachloroethylene, hexachloroethane, octachlorobutene, and even decachlorobutane. In general, increasing the number of chlorine substituents on a compound increases its toxicity but decreases its combustibility. Chlorination via carbon skeleton cleavage is thermodynamically preferred, whereas chlorinated C_{4} products are favored at lower temperatures and pressures. The three chlorinolysis products of hexachlorobutadiene are shown in the reactions below.

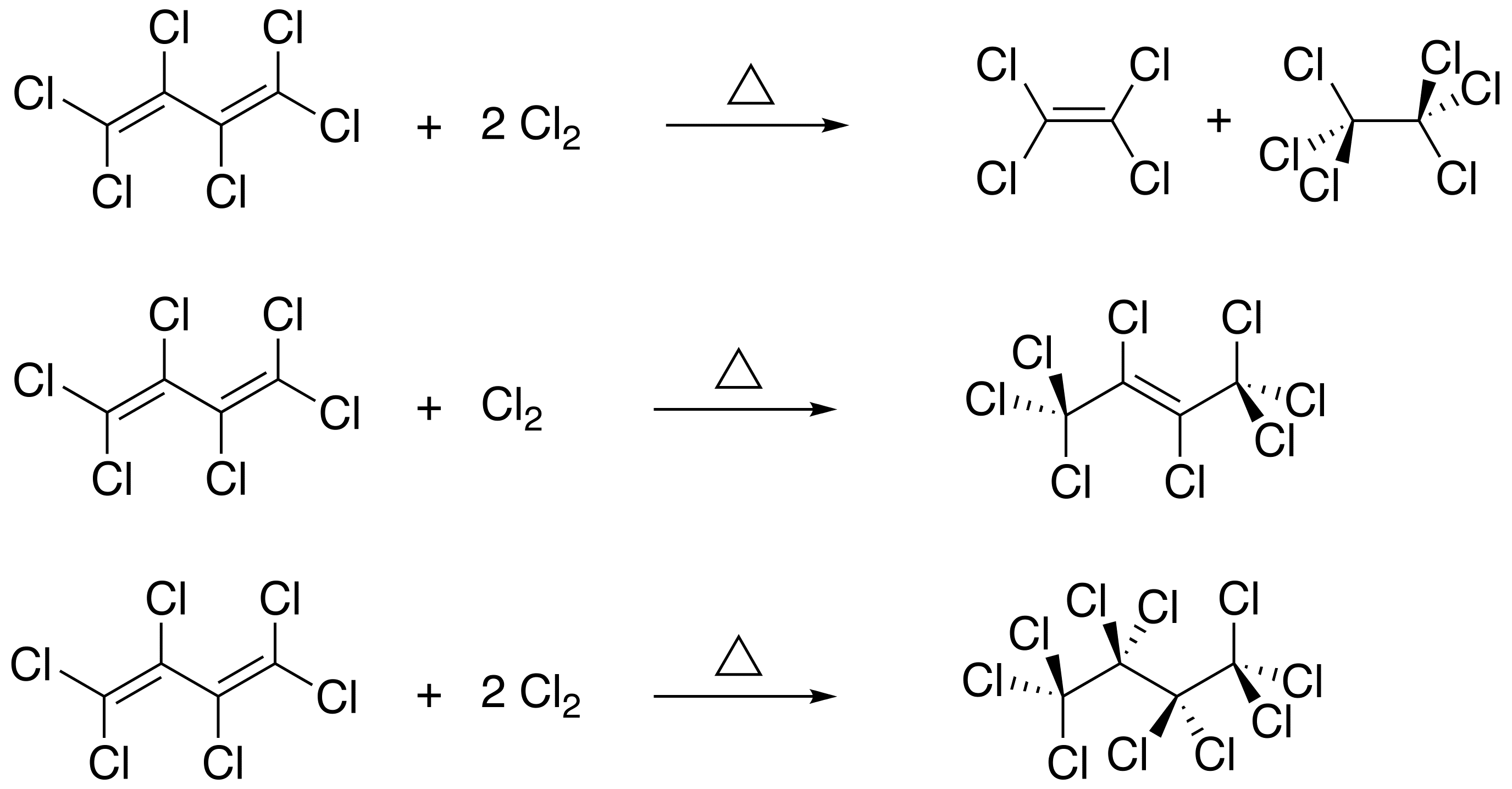

== Applications ==
One of the primary applications of hexachlorobutadiene is as a solvent for chlorine, a good example of the common aphorism "like dissolves like." The molar solubility of chlorine in HCBD at 0 °C is around 34% (2.17 mol/L). The solubility of another chlorine solvent, carbon tetrachloride, at 0 °C is about 30% (3.11 mol/L). One mole of C_{4}Cl_{6} can dissolve more chlorine than one mole of CCl_{4}, but the molecular weight difference between the two solvents is such that per liter of solvent, more chlorine can be dissolved in carbon tetrachloride. Shown below is the molar solubility of hexachlorobutadiene compared to carbon tetrachloride at various temperatures.

Temp (C)	Molar Solubility of HCBD	Molar Solubility of CCl_{4}
–20	60	60
0	34	30
20	21	18
40	13	10
60	10	8
80	6	5

Just like chlorine, many other chlorine-containing compounds can be readily dissolved in a solution of hexachlorobutadiene. As a solvent, it is unreactive toward common acids and select non-nucleophilic bases. An illustrative application HCBD as a solvent is the FeCl_{3}-catalyzed chlorination of toluene to give pentachloromethylbenzene. Hexachlorobutadiene is used exclusively over carbon tetrachloride in this reaction because ferric chloride (FeCl_{3}) is insoluble in CCl_{4}.

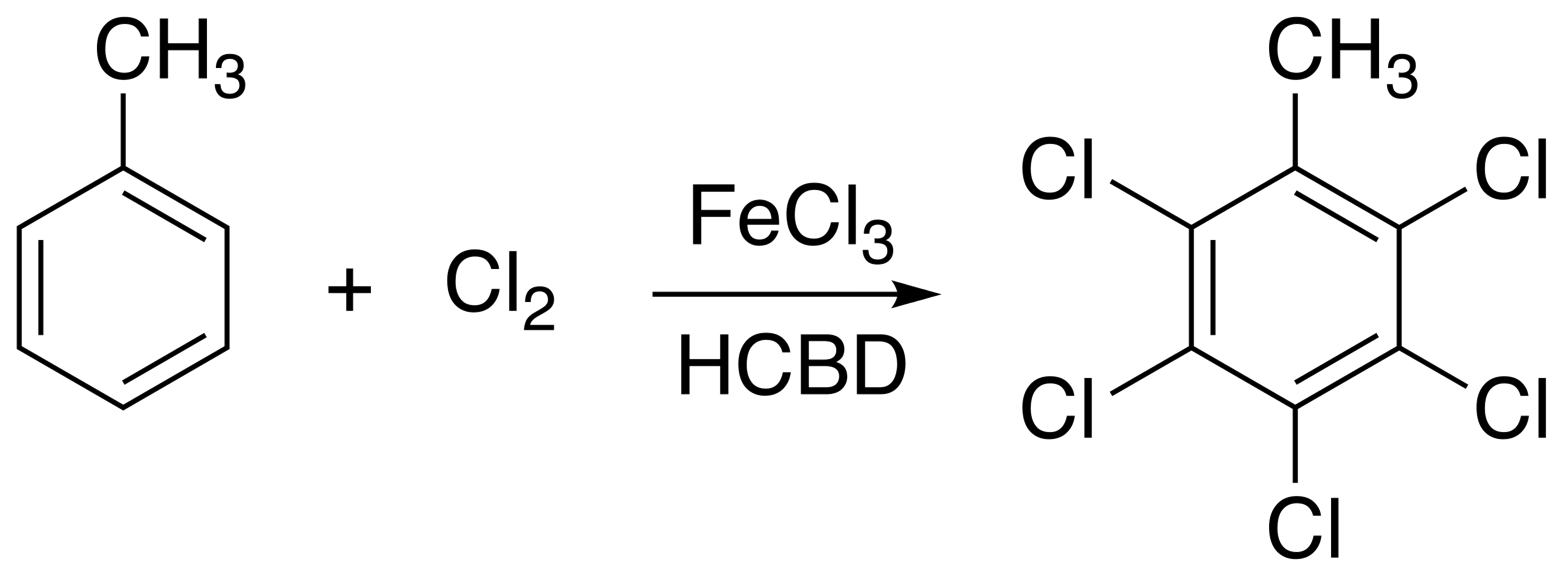

Given its affinity for chlorinated compounds, liquid HCBD is used as a scrubber in order to remove chlorine containing contaminants from gas streams. An example of this application is its use in the production of HCl gas as the primary contaminants, especially Cl_{2}, are more soluble in hexachlorobutadiene than the gaseous hydrogen chloride.

In IR spectroscopy, hexachlorobutadiene is occasionally used as a mull in order to analyze the stretching frequencies of C-H stretching bands. The usual mulling agent, Nujol, is a hydrocarbon and thus exhibits C-H stretching bands that can interfere with the signal from the sample. Since HCBD contains no C-H bonds, it can be used instead to obtain this portion of the IR spectrum. Unfortunately, some organometallic compounds react with HCBD, and therefore, care must be taken when selecting it as a mulling agent so as not to destroy the sample.

Hexachlorobutadiene has yet another, albeit somewhat dated, application as an algicide in industrial cooling systems. Although HCBD is a potent herbicide, in recent years, this particular application has been discouraged due to the high toxicity of the compound at low concentrations.

== Toxicity ==
Hexachlorobutadiene has been observed to produce systemic toxicity following exposure via oral, inhalation, and dermal routes. Effects may include fatty liver degeneration, epithelial necrotizing nephritis, central nervous system depression and cyanosis.

The United States Environmental Protection Agency has classified hexachlorobutadiene as a group C Possible Human Carcinogen. The American Conference of Governmental and Industrial Hygienists has classified hexachlorobutadiene as an A3 Confirmed Animal Carcinogen with Unknown Relevance to Humans. The National Institute for Occupational Safety and Health has set a recommended exposure limit at 0.02 ppm over an eight-hour workday.

== See also ==
- Hexafluorobutadiene
