= Chlorotrifluoroethylene =

Structural formula of chlorotrifluoroethylene
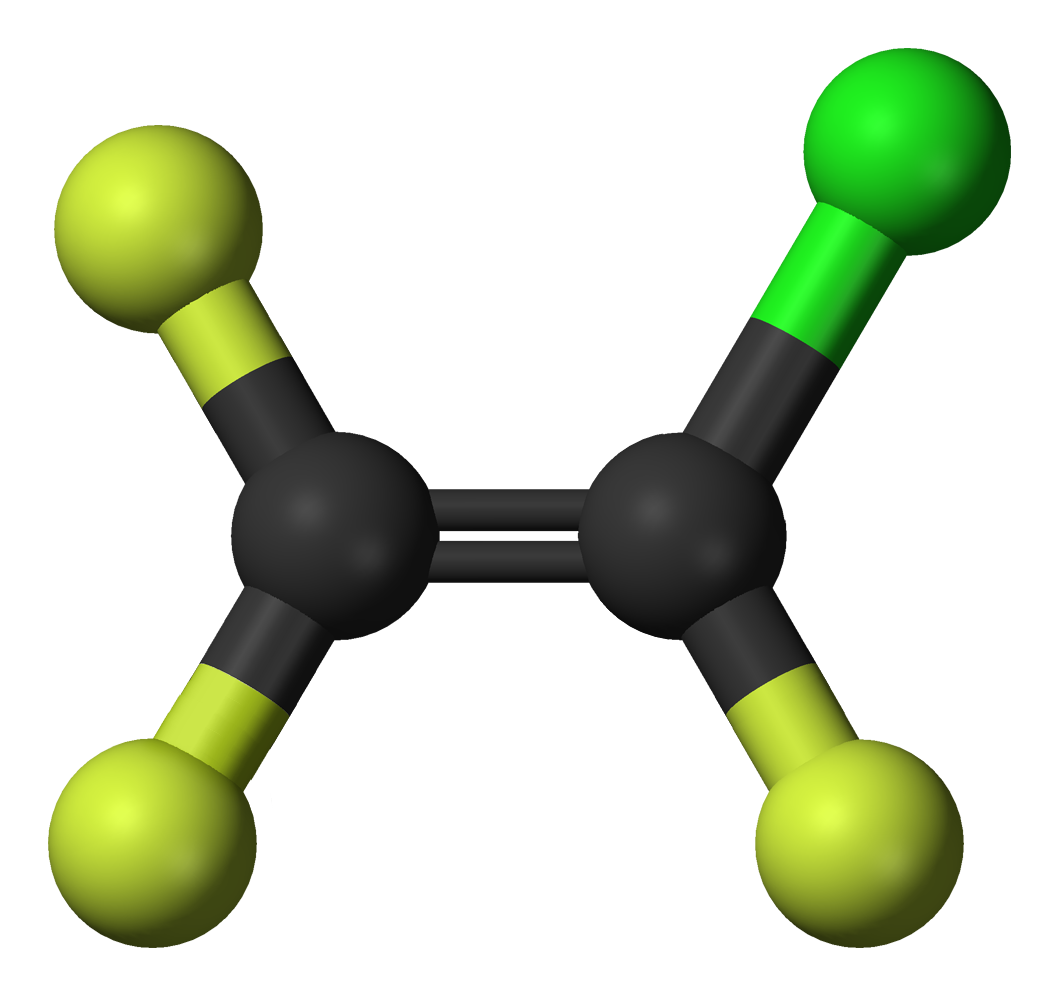
Ball-and-stick model of chlorotrifluoroethylene

Names
- Preferred IUPAC name 1-Chloro-1,2,2-trifluoroethene
- Other names Chlorotrifluoroethene; Trifluorochloroethylene

Identifiers
CAS Number	79-38-9
3D model (JSmol)	Interactive image
ChemSpider	6345
ECHA InfoCard	100.001.093
EC Number	201-201-8
PubChem CID	6594
RTECS number	KV0525000
UNII	AF215GW34G
UN number	1082
CompTox Dashboard (EPA)	DTXSID3026485
- InChI: InChI=1S/C2ClF3/c3-1(4)2(5)6 Key: UUAGAQFQZIEFAH-UHFFFAOYSA-N; InChI=1/C2ClF3/c3-1(4)2(5)6 Key: UUAGAQFQZIEFAH-UHFFFAOYAH
- SMILES: F/C(F)=C(/Cl)F

Properties
Chemical formula	C_{2}ClF_{3}
Molar mass	116.47 g·mol^{−1}
Appearance	Colorless gas
Odor	faint etheral odor
Density	1.54 g/cm^{3} at −60°C
Melting point	−158.2 °C (−252.8 °F; 115.0 K)
Boiling point	−27.8 °C (−18.0 °F; 245.3 K)
Solubility in water	4.01 g/100 mL
Solubility	soluble in benzene, chloroform
Magnetic susceptibility (χ)	−49.1·10^{−6} cm^{3}/mol
Refractive index (n_{D})	1.38 (0 °C)

Hazards
- GHS labelling
Pictograms	(GHS02: Flammable) (GHS06: Toxic)
Signal word	Danger
Hazard statements	H220, H301, H331
Precautionary statements	P210, P261, P264, P270, P271, P301+P310, P304+P340, P311, P321, P330, P377, P381, P403, P403+P233, P405, P410+P403, P501
NFPA 704 (fire diamond)	3 4 3
Explosive limits	24-40.3%

Related compounds
Related compounds	Tetrafluoroethylene; Bromotrifluoroethylene; Trifluoroiodoethylene; Dichlorodifluoroethylene; Trichlorofluoroethylene; Tetrachloroethylene
- Except where otherwise noted, data are given for materials in their standard state (at 25 °C [77 °F], 100 kPa). verify (what is ?) Infobox references

Chlorotrifluoroethylene (CTFE) is a chlorofluorocarbon with chemical formula CFCl=CF_{2}. It is commonly used as a refrigerant in cryogenic applications. CTFE has a carbon-carbon double bond and so can be polymerized to form polychlorotrifluoroethylene or copolymerized to produce the plastic ECTFE. PCTFE has the trade name Neoflon PCTFE from Daikin Industries in Japan, and it used to be produced under the trade name Kel-F from 3M Corporation in Minnesota.

== Production and reactions ==
Chlorotrifluoroethylene is produced commercially by the dechlorination of 1,1,2-trichloro-1,2,2-trifluoroethane with zinc:

CFCl_{2}-CF_{2}Cl + Zn → CClF=CF_{2} + ZnCl_{2}

In 2012, an estimated 1–10 million pounds were produced commercially in the United States.

Addition of iodine monochloride to chlorotrifluoroethylene gives iododichlorotrifluoroethane:

CF_{2}=CFCl + ICl → ClCF_{2}−CFCl(I)

The latter is a precursor to hexafluorobutadiene.

Thermal dimerization of chlorotrifluoroethylene gives 1,2-dichloro-1,2,3,3,4,4-hexafluorocyclobutane. Dechlorination of the latter gives hexafluorocyclobutene. It undergoes [2+2] cycloaddition to vinyl acetate.
