= C4H2O4 =

The molecular formula C_{4}H_{2}O_{4} (molar mass: 114.06 g/mol, exact mass: 113.9953 u) may refer to:

- Acetylenedicarboxylic acid, or butynedioic acid
- Squaric acid, or quadratic acid
