= Bandrowski =

Bandrowski is a Polish surname. It may refer to:

- Bronisław Bandrowski (1879–1914), Polish philosopher
- Ernest Tytus Bandrowski (1853–1920), Polish chemist
- Tomasz Bandrowski (born 1984), Polish footballer

== See also ==
- Juliusz Kaden-Bandrowski (1885–1944), Polish journalist
