= Dimethyl acetylenedicarboxylate =

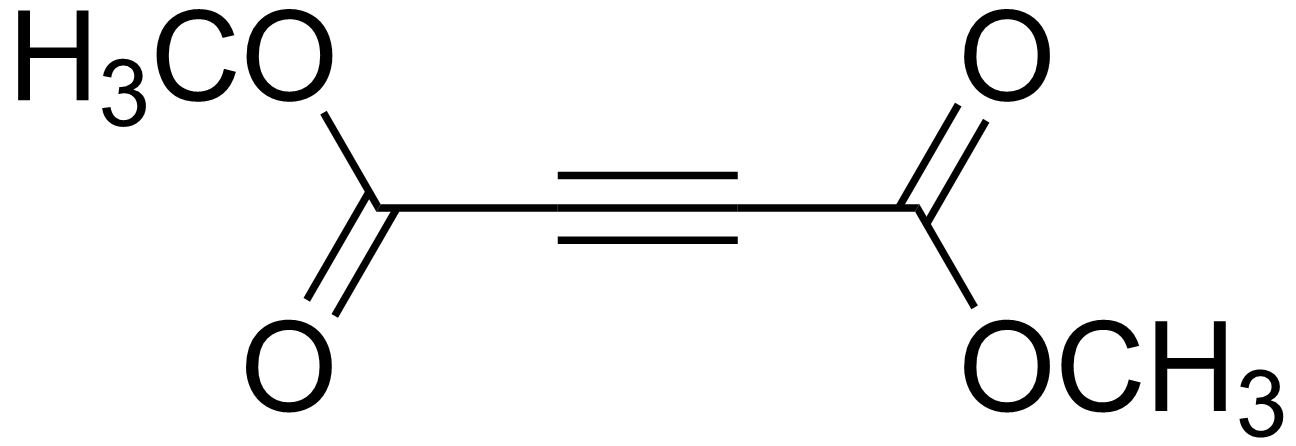
- Chemical structure of DMADuak

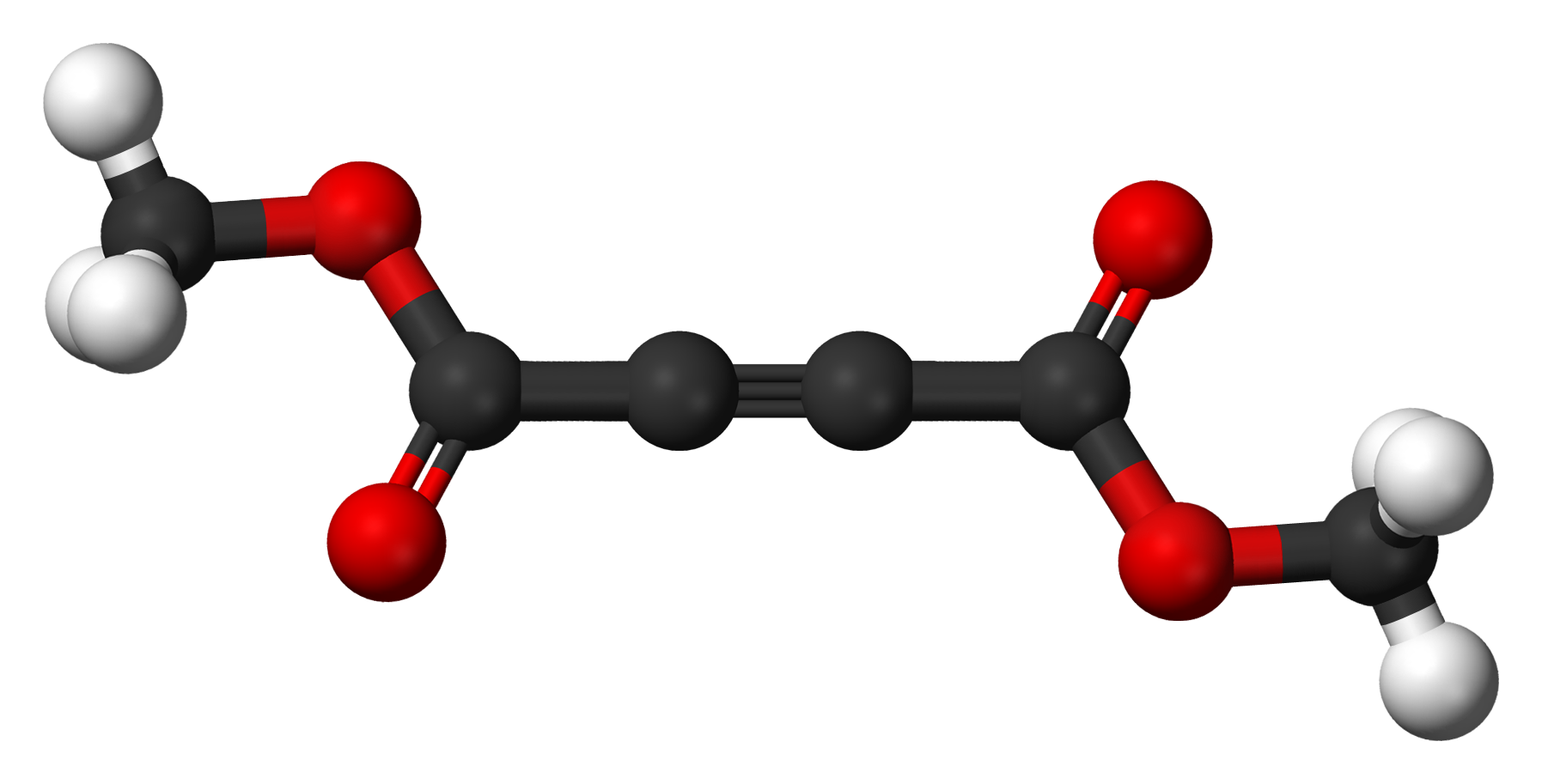
- Ball-and-stick model

Names
- Preferred IUPAC name Dimethyl but-2-ynedioate
- Other names DMAD; Dimethylacetylenedicarboxylate; Acetylenedicarboxylic acid dimethyl ester

Identifiers
CAS Number	762-42-5
3D model (JSmol)	Interactive image
ChEMBL	ChEMBL3248452
ChemSpider	12440
ECHA InfoCard	100.010.999
EC Number	212-098-4
PubChem CID	12980
RTECS number	ES0175000
UNII	7HZA2PL15F
CompTox Dashboard (EPA)	DTXSID0061088
- InChI: InChI=1S/C6H6O4/c1-9-5(7)3-4-6(8)10-2/h1-2H3 Key: VHILMKFSCRWWIJ-UHFFFAOYSA-N; InChI=1/C6H6O4/c1-9-5(7)3-4-6(8)10-2/h1-2H3 Key: VHILMKFSCRWWIJ-UHFFFAOYAX
- SMILES: COC(=O)C#CC(=O)OC

Properties
Chemical formula	C_{6}H_{6}O_{4}
Molar mass	142.11 g/mol
Appearance	Colorless liquid
Density	1.1564 g/cm^{3}
Melting point	−18 °C (0 °F; 255 K)
Boiling point	195 to 198 °C (383 to 388 °F; 468 to 471 K) (96–98° at 8 mm Hg)
Solubility in water	Insoluble
Solubility in other solvents	Soluble in most organic solvents
Refractive index (n_{D})	1.447

Structure
Dipole moment	0 D

Hazards
- Occupational safety and health (OHS/OSH)
Main hazards	Toxic
- GHS labelling
Pictograms	(GHS05: Corrosive) (GHS07: Exclamation mark)
Signal word	Danger
Hazard statements	H302, H314
Precautionary statements	P260, P264, P270, P280, P301+P312, P301+P330+P331, P303+P361+P353, P304+P340, P305+P351+P338, P310, P321, P330, P363, P405, P501
Flash point	187 °C (369 °F; 460 K)

Related compounds
Related compounds	Methyl propiolate, Hexafluoro-2-butyne, Acetylene
- Except where otherwise noted, data are given for materials in their standard state (at 25 °C [77 °F], 100 kPa). verify (what is ?) Infobox references

Dimethyl acetylenedicarboxylate (or dimethylacetylenedicarboxylate) (DMAD) is an organic compound with the formula CH_{3}O_{2}CC_{2}CO_{2}CH_{3}. It is a di-ester in which the ester groups are conjugated with a C-C triple bond. As such, the molecule is highly electrophilic, and is widely employed as a dienophile in cycloaddition reactions, such as the Diels-Alder reaction. It is also a potent Michael acceptor. This compound exists as a colorless liquid at room temperature. This compound was used in the preparation of nedocromil.

== Preparation ==
Although inexpensively available, DMAD is prepared today as it was originally. Maleic acid is brominated and the resulting dibromosuccinic acid is dehydrohalogenated with potassium hydroxide yielding acetylenedicarboxylic acid. The acid is then esterified with methanol, using sulfuric acid as a catalyst:

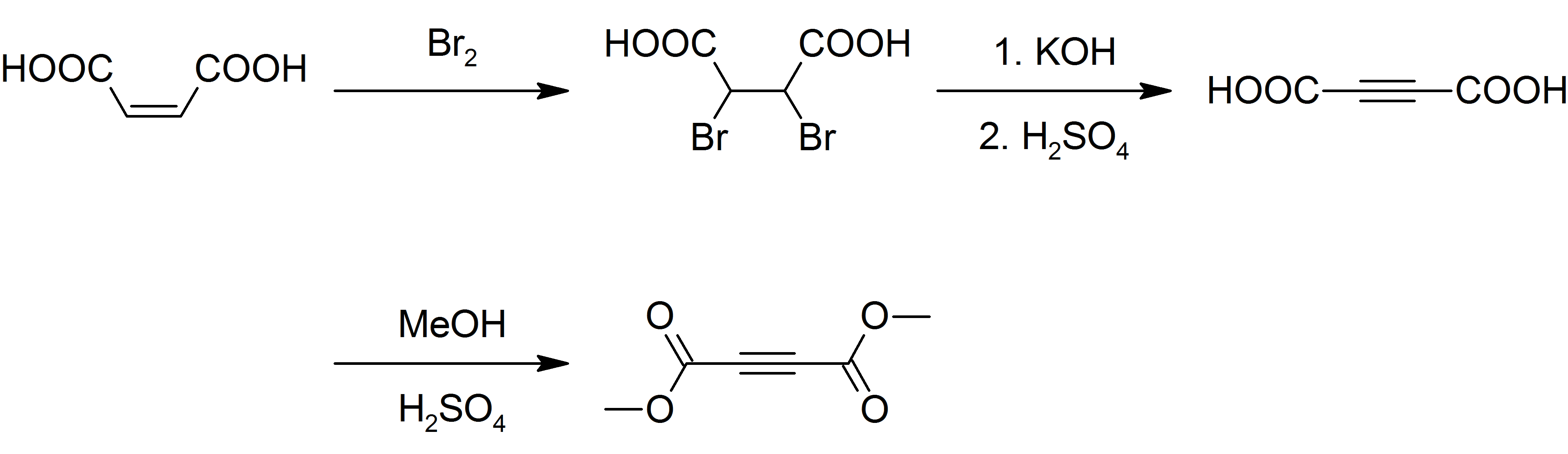

== Safety ==
DMAD is a lachrymator and a vesicant.
