= Polychlorotrifluoroethylene =

Names
- Other names Poly(1-chloro-1,2,2-trifluoroethylene); Poly(ethylene trifluoride chloride); Polymonochlorotrifluoroethylene; Poly(trifluoroethylene chloride); Poly(chlorotrifluoroethylene); Poly(trifluorochloroethene); Poly(chlorotrifluoroethene); Poly(trifluorovinyl chloride); Poly(vinyl trifluorochloride); Kel-F 300; Kel-F 81

Identifiers
CAS Number	9002-83-9
Abbreviations	PCTFE, PTFCE
ChemSpider	None
ECHA InfoCard	100.120.473
MeSH	Polychlorotrifluoroethene
CompTox Dashboard (EPA)	DTXSID80880201

Properties
Chemical formula	(C_{2}ClF_{3})_{n}°°
Molar mass	Variable
- Except where otherwise noted, data are given for materials in their standard state (at 25 °C [77 °F], 100 kPa). verify (what is ?) Infobox references

Polychlorotrifluoroethylene (PCTFE or PTFCE) is a thermoplastic chlorofluoropolymer with the molecular formula (CF_{2}CClF)_{n}, where n is the number of monomer units in the polymer molecule. It is similar to polytetrafluoroethene (PTFE), except that it is a homopolymer of the monomer chlorotrifluoroethylene (CTFE) instead of tetrafluoroethene. It has the lowest water vapor transmission rate of any plastic.

== History ==
It was discovered in 1934 by Fritz Schloffer and Otto Scherer who worked at IG Farben Company, Germany.

== Trade names ==
After World War II, PCTFE was commercialized under the trade name of Kel-F 81 by M. W. Kellogg Company in early 1950s. The name "Kel-F" was derived from "Kellogg" and "fluoropolymer", which also represents other fluoropolymers like the copolymer poly(chlorotrifluoroethylene-co-vinylidene fluoride) (Kel-F 800). These were acquired by 3M Company in 1957. 3M discontinued manufacturing of Kel-F by 1996.

PCTFE resin is now manufactured under different trade names such as Neoflon PCTFE from Daikin, Voltalef from Arkema, and Aclon from Honeywell. PCTFE films are sold under the tradename Aclar by Honeywell. Other current and former trade names of PCTFE include Hostaflon C2 from Hoechst, Fluon from ICI, Plaskon from Allied Chemical Corporation, Halon from Ausimont USA, and Ftoroplast-3 in the USSR and Russian Federation.

== Synthesis ==
PCTFE is an addition homopolymer. It is prepared by the free-radical polymerization of chlorotrifluoroethylene (CTFE) and can be carried out by solution, bulk, suspension and emulsion polymerization.

== Properties ==
PCTFE has high tensile strength and good thermal characteristics. It is nonflammable and the heat resistance is up to 175 °C. It has a low coefficient of thermal expansion. The glass transition temperature (T_{g}) is around 45 °C.

PCTFE has one of the highest limiting oxygen index (LOI). It has good chemical resistance. It also exhibits properties like zero moisture absorption and non wetting.

It does not absorb visible light. When subjected to high-energy radiation, it undergoes degradation like PTFE. It can be used as a transparent film.

The presence of a chlorine atom, having greater atomic radius than that of fluorine, hinders the close packing possible in PTFE. This results in having a relatively lower melting point among fluoropolymers, around 210–215 °C.

PCTFE is resistant to the attack by most chemicals and oxidizing agents, a property exhibited due to the presence of high fluorine content. However, it swells slightly in halocarbon compounds, ethers, esters and aromatic compounds. PCTFE is resistant to oxidation because it does not have any hydrogen atoms.

PCTFE exhibits a permanent dipole moment due to the asymmetry of its repeating unit. This dipole moment is perpendicular to the carbon-chain axis.

== Differences from PTFE ==
PCTFE is a homopolymer of chlorotrifluoroethylene (CTFE), whereas PTFE is a homopolymer of tetrafluoroethylene. The monomers of the former differs from that of latter structurally by having a chlorine atom replacing one of the fluorine atoms. Hence each repeating unit of PCTFE have a chlorine atom in place of a fluorine atom. This accounts for PCTFE to have less flexibility of chain and hence higher glass transition temperature. PTFE has a higher melting point and is more crystalline than PCTFE, but the latter is stronger and stiffer. Though PCTFE has excellent chemical resistance, it is still less than that of PTFE. PCTFE has lower viscosity, higher tensile strength and creep resistance than PTFE.

PCTFE is injection-moldable and extrudable, whereas PTFE is not.

== Applications ==
PCTFE is used primarily for two properties: water repulsion and chemical stability.

PCTFE films are used as protective layers against moisture. These include:

- moisture barriers in pharmaceutical blister packaging
- water-vapour barriers for protecting phosphor coatings in electroluminescent lamps (the phosphor chemicals are sensitive to moisture)
- protection of liquid-crystal display (LCD) panels, which are sensitive to moisture

Due to its chemical stability, it acts as a protective barrier against chemicals. It is used as a coating and prefabricated liner for chemical applications. PCTFE is also used for laminating other polymers like PVC, polypropylene, PETG, APET etc. It is also used in tubes, valves, chemical tank liners, O-rings, seals and gaskets.

PCTFE is used to protect sensitive electronic components because of its excellent electrical resistance and water repulsion. Other uses include flexible printed circuits and insulation of wires and cables.

Low-molecular-weight PCTFE waxes, oils and greases find their application as inert sealants and lubricants. They are also used as gyroscope flotation fluids and plasticizers for thermoplastics.

PCTFE is used for cryogenic seals and components. The cryogenic and liquid gas sector uses mainly PCTFE seals as this material has low gas absorption and good resistance to temperatures below -200 °C.

PCTFE is among the fluoropolymers used as sealing materials for liquid-oxygen systems, and PCTFE valve seats are used in oxygen regulators.
