= Acetylenedicarboxylate decarboxylase =

Class of enzymes

Identifiers
- EC no.: 4.1.1.78
- CAS no.: 72561-10-5

Databases
- BRENDA: enzyme data
- ExPASy: NiceZyme view
- KEGG: enzyme entry
- MetaCyc: metabolic pathway
- Rhea: reactions
- PDB structures: RCSB PDB PDBe PDBsum
- Gene Ontology: AmiGO / QuickGO
Search
- PMC: articles
- PubMed: articles
- NCBI: proteins

The enzyme acetylenedicarboxylate decarboxylase (EC 4.1.1.78), characterised from a Pseudomonas species, catalyzes the hydrolysis and decarboxylation of acetylenedicarboxylic acid to pyruvic acid and carbon dioxide:

acetylenedicarboxylic acid
H_{2}O
CO_{2}
pyruvic acid

This enzyme is a lyase, specifically a carboxy-lyase, which cleave carbon-carbon bonds. The systematic name of this enzyme class is acetylenedicarboxylate carboxy-lyase (pyruvate-forming). Other names in use include acetylenedicarboxylate hydratase, acetylenedicarboxylate hydrase, and acetylenedicarboxylate carboxy-lyase.
