= Nujol =

Brand of mineral oil

Nujol is a brand of light paraffin oil that was produced by Schering-Plough that was commonly used in infrared spectroscopy. As a paraffin oil it is largely chemically inert and has a relatively uncomplicated IR spectrum, with major peaks between 2950-2800, 1465-1450, and 1380–1300 cm^{−1}. Nujol is primarily a mixture of saturated hydrocarbons, i.e. alkanes with the formula C_{n}H_{(2n + 2)}.

To obtain an IR spectrum of a solid, a solid sample is combined with Nujol in a mortar and pestle or some other device to make a mull (a very thick suspension). The mull can be sandwiched between infrared-transparent plates such as potassium- or sodium chloride plates before being placed in the spectrometer. For very reactive samples, the layer of Nujol can provide a protective coating, preventing sample decomposition during acquisition of the IR spectrum. When preparing the sample it is important to keep the sample from being saturated with Nujol, this will result in erroneous spectra since the Nujol peaks will dominate, silencing the actual sample's peaks.
