= Mulling (spectroscopy) =

Mulling is the process of grinding up a sample into fine powder through mortar and pestle that is dispersed in a paraffin for infrared spectroscopy. The resulting powder is sometimes called a mull.

== Sample preparation ==
Using a nonporous ceramic mortar and pestle, a small quantity of the solid sample is ground up until the sample is exceedingly fine and has a glassy appearance. A drop of a mulling agent (see below) is added to the ground solid in the mortar. The mixture is further ground up to acquire a uniform paste with the consistency of toothpaste. The resulting paste is transferred to a salt plate (sodium chloride) with a small flat spatula. Applying another flat surface and sandwiching the paste under gentle compression renders the sample ready for analysis.

== Mulling agents ==
There are a variety of mineral oils used as mulling agents, their relevant differences being the absorption bands in their respective infrared spectra.

The mineral oil most commonly used in mulling is Nujol, which is essentially a liquid-paraffin-based solution. When it is used for mulling, its carbon-to-hydrogen bonds exhibit strong absorption in the infrared spectrum. These absorptions are so strong that they may mask those of any C-H bonds that may be present in the sample itself.

Another mulling agent that is commonly used is Fluorolube, essentially a fluorocarbon-based solution that exhibits strong carbon-to-fluorine bond absorptions from 1300 cm^{−1} onwards to 400 cm^{−1} in the mid-infrared spectrum. The useful range for observation of a sample in a mid-infrared spectrum when using Fluorolube as the mulling agent is 4000 cm^{−1} to 1300 cm^{−1}.

Because of these two agents’ complementary absorption processes, it is common to run a sample as both a Nujol mull and a Fluorolube mull separately. This allows for all of the spectral features of the sample to be seen in an infrared spectrum, since the regions masked by each specific mulling agent are unaffected by the other.
