= Hexafluoro-2-butyne =

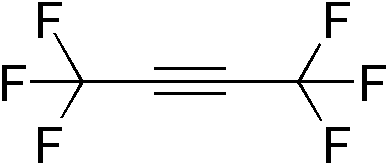
- Skeletal formula of hexafluoro-2-butyne

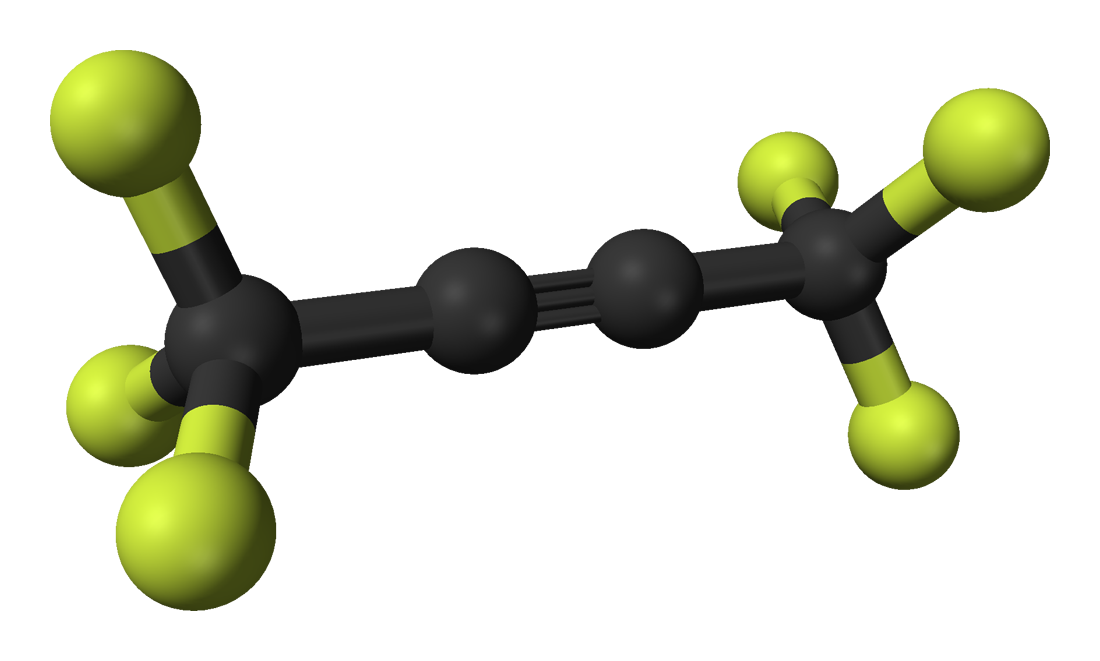
- Ball-and-stick model of hexafluorobut-2-yne

Names
- Preferred IUPAC name 1,1,1,4,4,4-Hexafluorobut-2-yne
- Other names HFB

Identifiers
CAS Number	692-50-2
3D model (JSmol)	Interactive image
ChemSpider	62855
ECHA InfoCard	100.010.667
EC Number	211-732-7
PubChem CID	69654
RTECS number	ES0702500
CompTox Dashboard (EPA)	DTXSID3061003
- InChI: InChI=1S/C4F6/c5-3(6,7)1-2-4(8,9)10 Key: WBCLXFIDEDJGCC-UHFFFAOYSA-N; InChI=1/C4F6/c5-3(6,7)1-2-4(8,9)10 Key: WBCLXFIDEDJGCC-UHFFFAOYAY
- SMILES: FC(F)(F)C#CC(F)(F)F

Properties
Chemical formula	C_{4}F_{6}
Molar mass	162.034 g·mol^{−1}
Appearance	Colorless gas
Density	1.602 g/cm^{3}
Melting point	−117 °C (−179 °F; 156 K)
Boiling point	−25 °C (−13 °F; 248 K)
Solubility in water	Insoluble

Structure
Dipole moment	0 D

Hazards
- Occupational safety and health (OHS/OSH)
Main hazards	Toxic gas
- GHS labelling
Pictograms	(GHS06: Toxic)
Signal word	Danger
Hazard statements	H331
Precautionary statements	P261, P311, P410+P403

Related compounds
Related compounds	Dimethyl acetylenedicarboxylate Hexachlorobutadiene; Acetylene
- Except where otherwise noted, data are given for materials in their standard state (at 25 °C [77 °F], 100 kPa). verify (what is ?) Infobox references

Hexafluoro-2-butyne (HFB) is a fluorocarbon with the chemical structure CF_{3}C≡CCF_{3}. HFB is a particularly electrophilic acetylene derivative, and hence a potent dienophile for Diels–Alder reactions.

== Synthesis and reactions ==
HFB is prepared by the action of sulfur tetrafluoride on acetylenedicarboxylic acid or by the reaction of potassium fluoride (KF) with hexachlorobutadiene.

In the presence of the strong Lewis acid aluminium chlorofluoride, hexafluorobutadiene isomerizes to HFB:

CF_{2}=CFCF=CF_{2} → CF_{3}C≡CCF_{3}

HFB reacts with sulfur to give 3,4-bis(trifluoromethyl)-1,2-dithiete.

Cycloaddition of HFB and dithionitronium (NS_{2}^{+}) gives the 1,2,5-dithiazolium cation.

As an electrophilic alkyne, HFB forms a variety of alkyne complexes by reaction with low-valent metal complexes.
