= Hexafluorocyclobutene =

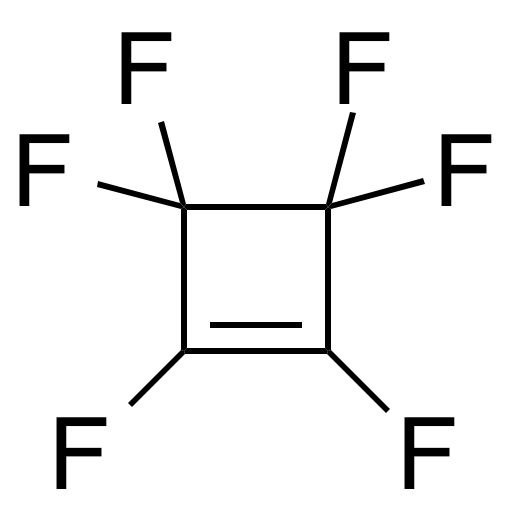

Names
- Preferred IUPAC name 1,2,3,3,4,4-Hexafluorocyclobut-1-ene
- Other names 1,2,3,3,4,4-hexafluorocyclobutene, perfluorocyclobutene

Identifiers
CAS Number	697-11-0
3D model (JSmol)	Interactive image
ChemSpider	12242
EC Number	211-803-2
PubChem CID	12767
UNII	TGC3HN2GMW
CompTox Dashboard (EPA)	DTXSID2073229
- InChI: InChI=1S/C4F6/c5-1-2(6)4(9,10)3(1,7)8 Key: QVHWOZCZUNPZPW-UHFFFAOYSA-N
- SMILES: C1(=C(C(C1(F)F)(F)F)F)F

Properties
Chemical formula	C_{4}F_{6}
Molar mass	162.034 g·mol^{−1}
Appearance	colorless gas
Melting point	−60 °C (−76 °F; 213 K)
Boiling point	5.5 °C (41.9 °F; 278.6 K)
- Except where otherwise noted, data are given for materials in their standard state (at 25 °C [77 °F], 100 kPa). Infobox references

Hexafluorocyclobutene is the organofluorine compound with the formula (CF_{2})_{2}(CF)_{2}. A colorless gas, it is a precursor to a variety of compounds, including squaric acid. Hexafluorocyclobutene is prepared in two steps from chlorotrifluoroethylene. The thermal dimerization gives 1,2-dichloro-1,2,3,3,4,4-hexafluorocyclobutane. Dechlorination of the latter gives hexafluorocyclobutene:

C_{4}F_{6}Cl_{2} + Zn → C_{4}F_{6} + ZnCl_{2}

== Safety ==
Reminiscent of perfluoroisobutene, hexafluorocyclobutene is quite toxic with an LD = 6000 mg/min/m^{−3} (mice).

== See also ==
- Hexafluoro-2-butyne
- Hexafluorobutadiene
