= Iodotrifluoroethylene =

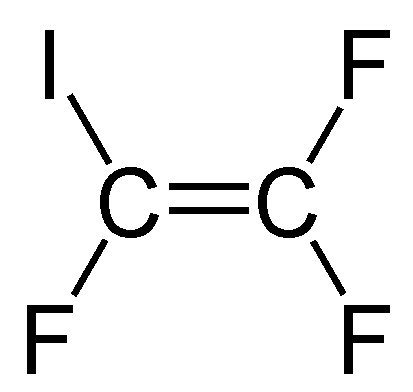

Names
- Preferred IUPAC name 1,1,2-Trifluoro-2-iodoethene
- Other names 1,1,2-Trifluoro-2-iodoethylene, trifluoroiodoethylene, iodotrifluoroethylene

Identifiers
CAS Number	359-37-5
3D model (JSmol)	Interactive image
ChemSpider	61074
ECHA InfoCard	100.006.028
EC Number	206-629-9
PubChem CID	67755
UNII	LKV2XT37FH
CompTox Dashboard (EPA)	DTXSID0073166
- InChI: InChI=1S/C2F3I/c3-1(4)2(5)6 Key: PZVZTKFRZJMHEM-UHFFFAOYSA-N; InChI=1/C2F3I/c3-1(4)2(5)6
- SMILES: F/C(F)=C(\F)I

Properties
Chemical formula	C_{2}F_{3}I
Molar mass	207.92 g/mol
Density	2.284 g/cm^{3}
Boiling point	30 °C (86 °F; 303 K)

Hazards
- Occupational safety and health (OHS/OSH)
Main hazards	Irritant (Xi)
- Except where otherwise noted, data are given for materials in their standard state (at 25 °C [77 °F], 100 kPa). verify (what is ?) Infobox references

Iodotrifluoroethylene is the organofluorine compound with the formula C_{2}F_{3}I. It is a volatile colorless liquid.

== Preparation and reactions ==
It is prepared by iodination of trifluorovinyl lithium.

Iodotrifluoroethylene reacts with cadmium metal to give CdC_{2}F_{3}(I).

It reacts with nitric oxide under UV light, producing a nitroso compound, with iodine as a byproduct:

2 C_{2}F_{3}I + 2 NO → 2 C_{2}F_{3}NO + I_{2}
