= Isopropyl propionate =

Isopropyl ester of propionic acid

- Vial containing isopropyl propionate

Names
- Systematic IUPAC name Propan-2-yl propanoate

Identifiers
CAS Number	637-78-5
3D model (JSmol)	Interactive image
ChEBI	CHEBI:89827
ChemSpider	11992
ECHA InfoCard	100.010.274
EC Number	211-300-8
PubChem CID	12508
UNII	NGB0AK08T9
UN number	2409
CompTox Dashboard (EPA)	DTXSID6060927
- InChI: InChI=1S/C6H12O2/c1-4-6(7)8-5(2)3/h5H,4H2,1-3H3 Key: IJMWOMHMDSDKGK-UHFFFAOYSA-N
- SMILES: CCC(=O)OC(C)C

Properties
Chemical formula	C_{6}H_{12}O_{2}
Molar mass	116.160 g·mol^{−1}
Appearance	colorless
Density	0.863-0.869 g/cm^{3}
Boiling point	108–111 °C (226–232 °F; 381–384 K)
Solubility in water	5.95 mg/mL
Solubility	completely miscible with alcohol
log P	1.57
Refractive index (n_{D})	1.384-1.390

Hazards
- GHS labelling
Pictograms	(GHS02: Flammable)
Signal word	Danger
Hazard statements	H225
Precautionary statements	P210, P233, P240, P241, P242, P243, P280, P303+P361+P353, P370+P378, P403+P235, P501
- Except where otherwise noted, data are given for materials in their standard state (at 25 °C [77 °F], 100 kPa). Infobox references

Isopropyl propionate, also known as isopropyl propanoate, is an organic compound. It is an ester of propionic acid and isopropanol.

== Properties ==
Isopropyl propionate is a colorless liquid that is less dense than water. It has a sweet and fruity odour and is described as having a fruity flavor type.

== Synthesis ==
It can be synthesized by esterification using isopropyl alcohol, propionic acid, and sulfuric acid as a catalyst. Water is side product of this reaction.

== Use ==
It can be used as a solvent, fragrance ingredient, and flavoring agent.
