= Ernest Tytus Bandrowski =

Polish chemist

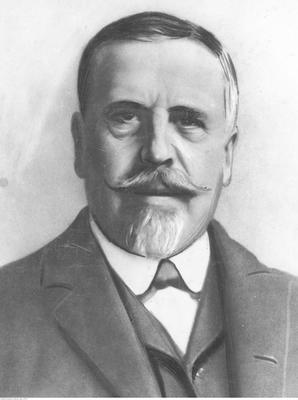
Ernest Titus Bandrovsky

Ernest Tytus Bandrowski (Polish pronunciation: [ˈɛr.nɛst bandrɔfski]; 3 January 1853 – 28 November 1920) was a Polish chemist.

Bandrowski was professor at the Jagiellonian University starting in 1896. He studied crystalloluminescence and described a number of chemical compounds, such as acetylenedicarboxylic acid.
