= Bromotrifluoroethylene =

Names
- IUPAC name bromotrifluoroethene
- Other names trifluorovinyl bromide, trifluorobromoethylene

Identifiers
CAS Number	598-73-2
3D model (JSmol)	Interactive image
ChemSpider	11237
ECHA InfoCard	100.009.045
EC Number	209-948-1
PubChem CID	11730
UN number	2419
CompTox Dashboard (EPA)	DTXSID0060513
- InChI: InChI=1S/C2BrF3/c3-1(4)2(5)6 Key: AYCANDRGVPTASA-UHFFFAOYSA-N
- SMILES: C(=C(F)Br)(F)F

Properties
Chemical formula	C_{2}BrF_{3}
Molar mass	160.921 g·mol^{−1}
Appearance	colourless gas
Odor	moldy, phosgene-like
Boiling point	−2.5 °C

Hazards
- Occupational safety and health (OHS/OSH)
Main hazards	spontaneous polymerisation, flammable
- GHS labelling
Pictograms	(GHS02: Flammable) (GHS04: Compressed Gas) (GHS06: Toxic) (GHS07: Exclamation mark)
Signal word	Danger
Hazard statements	H220, H280, H315, H319, H330, H332, H335
Precautionary statements	P203, P210, P222, P260, P264, P264+P265, P271, P280, P284, P302+P352, P304+P340, P305+P351+P338, P316, P317, P319, P320, P321, P332+P317, P337+P317, P362+P364, P377, P381, P403, P403+P233, P405, P410+P403, P501
- Except where otherwise noted, data are given for materials in their standard state (at 25 °C [77 °F], 100 kPa). Infobox references

Bromotrifluoroethylene (BTFE) is a halogenated ethylene derivative with the chemical formula F_{2}CCBrF. It is a highly flammable colourless gas with a musty odour resembling phosgene. It can polymerise spontaneously.

== Preparation ==
Bromotrifluoroethylene can be prepared from chlorotrifluoroethylene with high yields:

F_{2}C=ClF + HBr → CF_{2}BrCHClF + Zn → CF_{2}=CHF + ZnBrCl
CF_{2}=CHF + Br_{2} → CF_{2}BrCHBrF + KOH → CF_{2}=CFBr + KBr + H_{2}O

It was first prepared by the Belgian chemist Frédéric Swarts in 1899.

== Reactions and uses ==
Bromotrifluoroethylene forms metal complexes with substituted phosphine compounds and platinum(II).

BTFE can polymerise on standing. Spontaneous polymerisation may be inhibited by addition of tributylamine. UV light and heat may accelerate polymerisation. It participates in various co-polymerisation reactions. BTFE telomers are oily liquids sold under the tradename BFC oil. The telomers can be prepared with fluorotrichloromethane or tetrachloromethane as telogens. If tetrachloromethane is used for the telomerisation, it will have -CCl_{3} terminals. It is a useful reagent for the synthesis of trifluorovinyl compounds.
