= Methylcyclopropane =

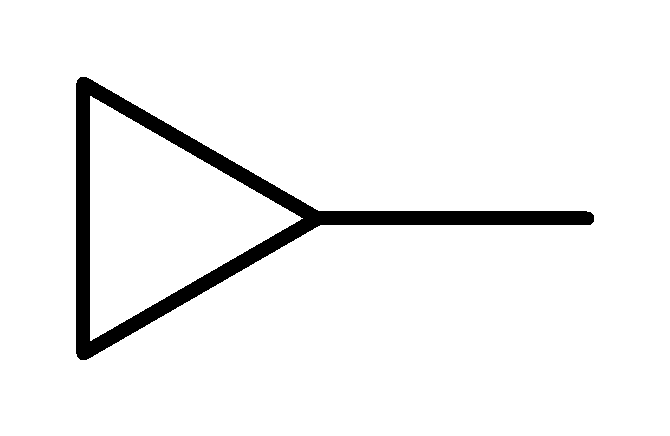

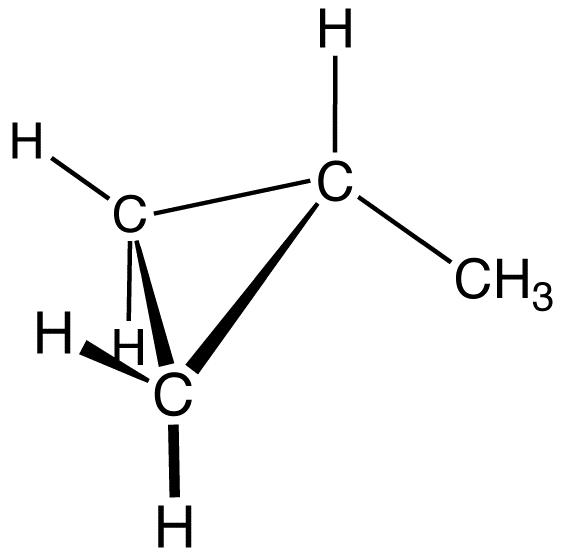

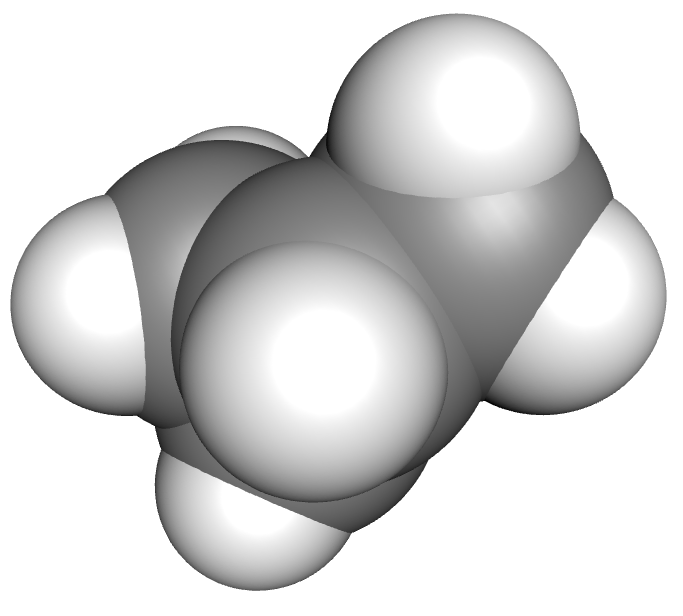

Names
- Preferred IUPAC name Methylcyclopropane

Identifiers
CAS Number	594-11-6
3D model (JSmol)	Interactive image
ChemSpider	11167
ECHA InfoCard	100.008.934
EC Number	209-825-2
MeSH	C105498
PubChem CID	11657
UNII	LK35EZ3VK8
CompTox Dashboard (EPA)	DTXSID5060481
- InChI: InChI=1S/C4H8/c1-4-2-3-4/h4H,2-3H2,1H3 Key: VNXBKJFUJUWOCW-UHFFFAOYSA-N; InChI=1/C4H8/c1-4-2-3-4/h4H,2-3H2,1H3 Key: VNXBKJFUJUWOCW-UHFFFAOYAC
- SMILES: CC1CC1

Properties
Chemical formula	C_{4}H_{8}
Molar mass	56.108 g·mol^{−1}
Appearance	Colourless gas
Density	0.6912 g/cm^{3}
Melting point	−177.3 °C (−287.1 °F; 95.8 K)
Boiling point	0.7 °C (33.3 °F; 273.8 K)
- Except where otherwise noted, data are given for materials in their standard state (at 25 °C [77 °F], 100 kPa). verify (what is ?) Infobox references

Methylcyclopropane is an organic compound with the structural formula C_{3}H_{5}CH_{3}. This colorless gas is the monomethyl derivative of cyclopropane.

== Reactions ==
Methylcyclopropane, like many other cyclopropanes, undergoes ring-opening reactions. Bond cleavage in certain reactions is also reported in conjunction with the use of methylenecyclopropane groups as protective groups for amines.
