= Acetylenedicarboxylic acid =

- Structural formula of acetylenedicarboxylic acid

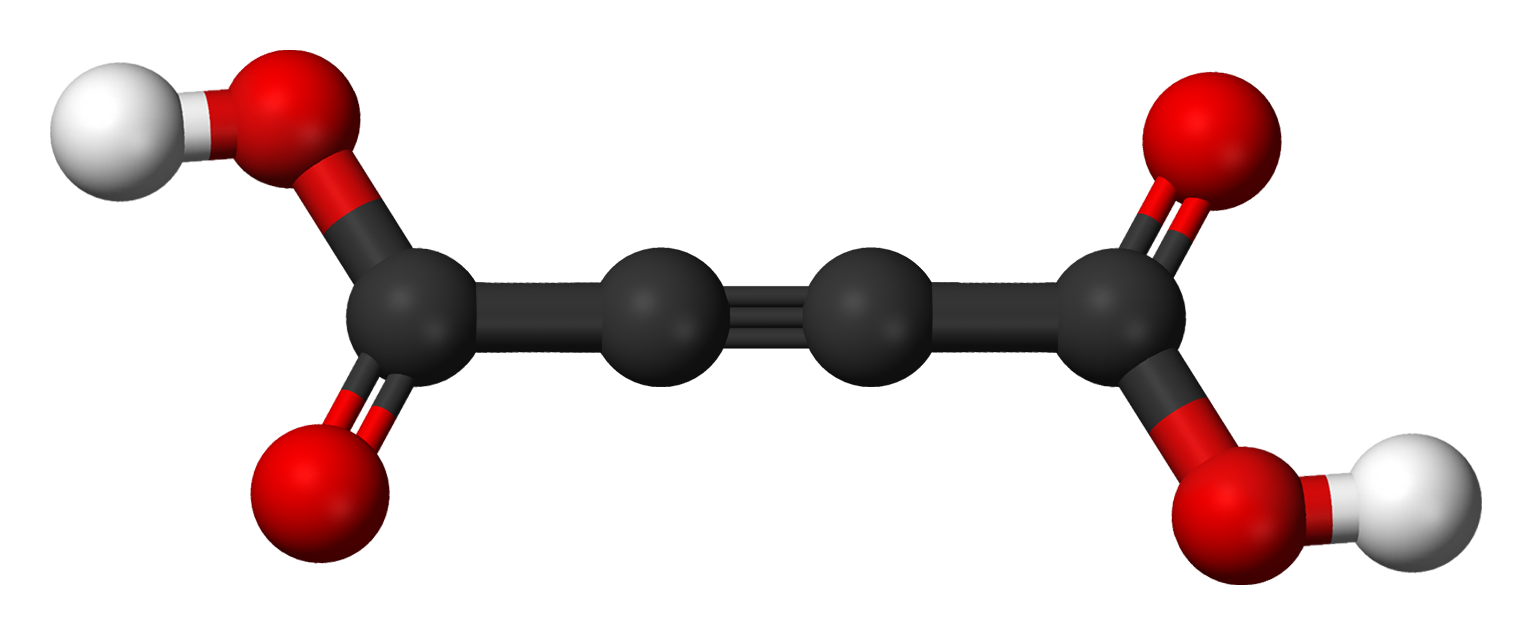
- Ball-and-stick model

Names
- Preferred IUPAC name But-2-ynedioic acid
- Other names 2-Butynedioic acid

Identifiers
CAS Number	142-45-0
3D model (JSmol)	Interactive image; Interactive image
Beilstein Reference	878357
ChEBI	CHEBI:30781
ChemSpider	362
ECHA InfoCard	100.005.033
EC Number	205-536-0
Gmelin Reference	26624
KEGG	C03248
PubChem CID	371
UNII	2D2OJ4KO44
CompTox Dashboard (EPA)	DTXSID3059715
- InChI: InChI=1S/C4H2O4/c5-3(6)1-2-4(7)8/h(H,5,6)(H,7,8) Key: YTIVTFGABIZHHX-UHFFFAOYSA-N; InChI=1/C4H2O4/c5-3(6)1-2-4(7)8/h(H,5,6)(H,7,8) Key: YTIVTFGABIZHHX-UHFFFAOYAA
- SMILES: C(#CC(=O)O)C(=O)O; O=C(O)C#CC(=O)O

Properties
Chemical formula	H_{2}C_{4}O_{4}
Molar mass	114.056 g·mol^{−1}
Appearance	Crystalline solid
Melting point	175 to 176 °C (347 to 349 °F; 448 to 449 K) (decomposes); 180–187 °C (decomposes)
Conjugate base	Hydrogen acetylenedicarboxylate (chemical formula HC_{4}O^{−}_{4})

Hazards
- GHS labelling
Pictograms	(GHS05: Corrosive) (GHS06: Toxic) (GHS07: Exclamation mark)
Signal word	Danger
Hazard statements	H301, H314, H315, H319, H335
Precautionary statements	P260, P264, P270, P271, P280, P301+P310, P301+P330+P331, P302+P352, P303+P361+P353, P304+P340, P305+P351+P338, P310, P312, P321, P330, P332+P313, P337+P313, P362, P363, P403+P233, P405, P501
- Except where otherwise noted, data are given for materials in their standard state (at 25 °C [77 °F], 100 kPa). verify (what is ?) Infobox references

Acetylenedicarboxylic acid or butynedioic acid is an organic compound (a dicarboxylic acid) with the formula H_{2}C_{4}O_{4} or HO−C(=O)−C≡C−C(=O)−OH. It is a crystalline solid that is soluble in diethyl ether.

The removal of two protons yields the acetylenedicarboxylate dianion C_{4}O^{2−}_{4}, which consists only of carbon and oxygen, making it an oxocarbon anion. Partial ionization yields the monovalent hydrogen acetylenedicarboxylate anion HC_{4}O^{−}_{4}.

The acid was first described in 1877 by Polish chemist Ernest Bandrowski. It can be obtained by treating α,β-dibromosuccinic acid with potassium hydroxide KOH in methanol or ethanol. The reaction yields potassium bromide and potassium acetylenedicarboxylate. The salts are separated and the latter is treated with sulfuric acid.

Acetylenedicarboxylic acid is used in the synthesis of dimethyl acetylenedicarboxylate, an important laboratory reagent. The acid is commonly traded as a laboratory chemical. It can also be reacted with sulfur tetrafluoride to produce hexafluoro-2-butyne, a powerful dienophile for use in Diels-Alder reactions.

Fatty alcohol esters of acetylenedicarboxylic acid can be used for the preparation of phase change materials (PCM).

== Anions and salts ==
Hydrogen acetylenedicarboxylate (often abbreviated as Hadc or HADC) is a monovalent anion of acetylenedicarboxylic acid with the formula HC_{4}O^{−}_{4} or HO−C(=O)−C≡C−CO^{−}_{2}. The anion can be derived from acetylenedicarboxylic acid by removal of a single proton or from the acetylenedicarboxylate dianion by addition of a proton. The name is also used for any salt of this anion. Salts of this anion are of interest in crystallography because they contain unusually short and strong hydrogen bonds. In many crystalline salts (with the exception of the lithium one), the HADC units form linear chains connected by strong hydrogen bonds. Each carboxylate group is usually planar; but the two groups may lie in different planes due to rotation about the carbon–carbon bonds. They are coplanar in the hydrated salts NaHC_{4}O_{4}·2H_{2}O and CsHC_{4}O_{4}·2H_{2}O, nearly coplanar in the guanidinium salt [C(NH_{2})_{3}]^{+}[HC_{4}O_{4}]^{−}, but off by 60° or more in other salts such as anhydrous KHC_{4}O_{4}.

Potassium hydrogen acetylenedicarboxylate is a potassium salt of HADC with chemical formula KHC_{4}O_{4} or K^{+}HC_{4}O^{−}_{4}, often abbreviated as KHadc. It is often called potassium hydrogen acetylenedicarboxylate or monopotassium acetylenedicarboxylate. The salt can be obtained from acetylenedicarboxylic acid and is a common laboratory starting material for the synthesis of other derivatives of that acid. In the crystalline form, the hydrogen acetylenedicarboxylate anions are joined into linear chains by uncommonly short hydrogen bonds.

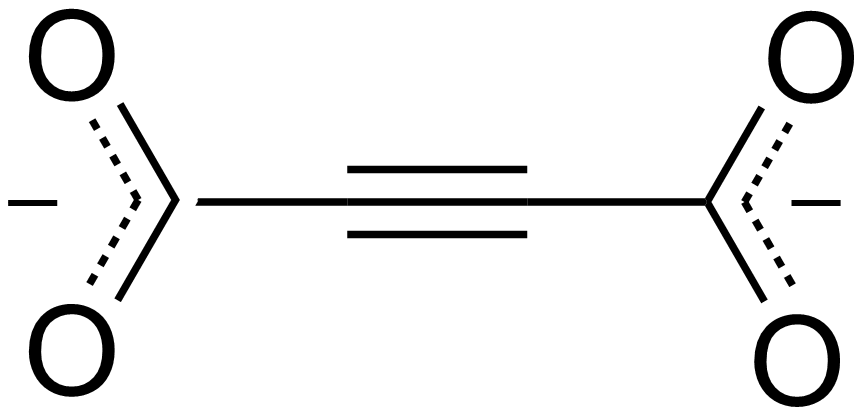
Chemical structure of acetylenedicarboxylate

Acetylenedicarboxylate (often abbreviated as ADC or adc) is a divalent anion with formula C_{4}O^{2−}_{4} or [O_{2}C−C≡C−CO_{2}]^{2−}; or any salt or ester thereof. The anion can be derived from acetylenedicarboxylic acid by the loss of two protons. It is one of several oxocarbon anions which, like carbonate CO^{2−}_{3} and oxalate C_{2}O^{2−}_{4}, consist solely of carbon and oxygen. The ADC anion can aсt as a ligand in organometallic complexes, such as the blue polymeric complex with copper(II) and 2,2′-bipyridine, [Cu^{2+}[C_{4}O_{4}]^{2−}·(C_{5}H_{4}N)_{2}]_{n}. Thallium(I) acetylenedicarboxylate (Tl_{2}C_{4}O_{4}) decomposes at 195 °C, leaving a residue of pyrophoric thallium powder.

== See also ==
- Acetylenedicarboxylate decarboxylase
- Oxalic acid
- Acetylenediol
