= Hexafluorobutadiene =

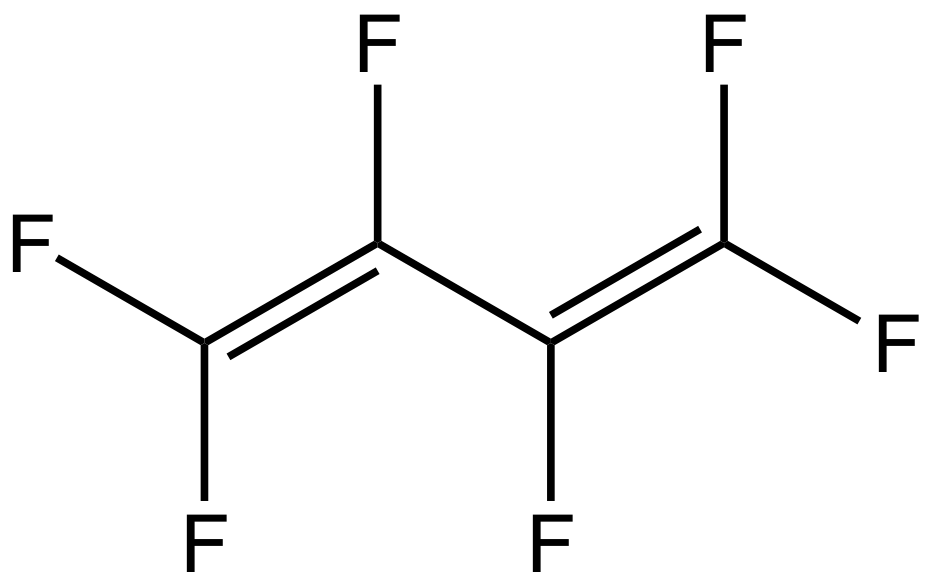

Names
- Preferred IUPAC name Hexafluorobuta-1,3-diene
- Other names 1,1,2,3,4,4-Hexafluoro-1,3-butadiene, FC 2316

Identifiers
CAS Number	685-63-2
3D model (JSmol)	Interactive image
ChemSpider	62837
ECHA InfoCard	100.010.620
EC Number	211-681-0
PubChem CID	69636
UNII	3KQJ9VP55Z
CompTox Dashboard (EPA)	DTXSID4060991
- InChI: InChI=1S/C4F6/c5-1(3(7)8)2(6)4(9)10 Key: LGPPATCNSOSOQH-UHFFFAOYSA-N
- SMILES: C(=C(F)F)(C(=C(F)F)F)F

Properties
Chemical formula	C_{4}F_{6}
Molar mass	162.034 g·mol^{−1}
Appearance	colorless gas
Density	1.44 g/cm^{3} (@15 °C)
Melting point	−132 °C (−206 °F; 141 K)
Boiling point	6 °C (43 °F; 279 K)

Hazards
- GHS labelling
Pictograms	(GHS02: Flammable) (GHS06: Toxic)
Signal word	Danger
Hazard statements	H220, H331
Precautionary statements	P210, P261, P271, P304+P340, P311, P321, P377, P381, P403, P403+P233, P405, P410+P403, P501
- Except where otherwise noted, data are given for materials in their standard state (at 25 °C [77 °F], 100 kPa). Infobox references

Hexafluorobutadiene is an organofluorine compound with the formula (CF_{2}=CF)_{2}. A colorless gas, it has attracted attention as an etchant in microelectronics. It is the perfluoroanalogue of butadiene.

== Preparation ==
It can be prepared by coupling of fluorinated C_{2} precursors. Addition of iodine monochloride to chlorotrifluoroethylene gives iododichlorotrifluoroethane that can be coupled in the presence of mercury to give 1,2,3,4-tetrchlorohexafluorobutane:

2 CF_{2}Cl−CFCl(I) + Hg → CF_{2}Cl−CFCl−CFCl−CF_{2}Cl + HgI_{2}

Zn-induced dechlorination of this tetrachloride gives the desired perfluorinated diene:

CF_{2}Cl−CFCl−CFCl−CF_{2}Cl + 2 Zn → CF_{2}=CF−CF=CF_{2} + 2 ZnCl_{2}

== Reactions ==
The diene can be rehalogenated, e.g. with bromine upon UV irradiation:

CF_{2}=CF−CF=CF_{2} + 2 Br_{2} → CF_{2}Br−CFBr−CFBr−CF_{2}Br

Hexafluorobutadiene dimerizes via a [2+2] process at 150 °C to give perfluorinated divinylcyclobutanes.

In the presence of the strong Lewis acid aluminium chlorofluoride, hexafluorobutadiene isomerizes to hexafluoro-2-butyne:

CF_{2}=CFCF=CF_{2} → CF_{3}C≡CCF_{3}

== See also ==
- Hexafluorocyclobutene, an isomer of C_{4}F_{6}
- Hexachlorobutadiene
