= Pentene =

Chemical compound (C5H10)

Straight chain pentenes
- 1-Pentene

- cis-2-Pentene

- trans-2-Pentene

Names
- IUPAC names Pent-1-ene cis-Pent-2-ene trans-Pent-2-ene
- Other names amylene, n-amylene, n-pentene, beta-n-amylene, sym-methylethylethylene

Identifiers
CAS Number	109-67-1 (1-pentene); 627-20-3 (cis-2-pentene); 646-04-8 (trans-2-pentene)
3D model (JSmol)	(1-pentene): Interactive image; (cis-2-pentene): Interactive image; (trans-2-pentene): Interactive image
ChemSpider	7713 (1-pentene); 4483638 (cis-2-pentene); 4483639 (trans-2-pentene)
ECHA InfoCard	100.042.636
EC Number	246-916-6 (1-pentene) 273-308-8 (cis-2-pentene) 271-255-5 (trans-2-pentene)
PubChem CID	8004 (1-pentene); 5326160 (cis-2-pentene); 5326161 (trans-2-pentene)
UNII	ALP8M0LU81 (1-pentene); 54UR3XZ4FC (cis-2-pentene); YCO1SJQ98H (trans-2-pentene)
CompTox Dashboard (EPA)	DTXSID7026819
- InChI: (1-pentene): InChI=1S/C5H10/c1-3-5-4-2/h3H,1,4-5H2,2H3 Key: YWAKXRMUMFPDSH-UHFFFAOYSA-N; (cis-2-pentene): InChI=1S/C5H10/c1-3-5-4-2/h3,5H,4H2,1-2H3/b5-3- Key: QMMOXUPEWRXHJS-HYXAFXHYSA-N; (trans-2-pentene): InChI=1S/C5H10/c1-3-5-4-2/h3,5H,4H2,1-2H3/b5-3+ Key: QMMOXUPEWRXHJS-HWKANZROSA-N
- SMILES: (1-pentene): CCCC=C; (cis-2-pentene): CC/C=C\C; (trans-2-pentene): CC/C=C/C

Properties
Chemical formula	C_{5}H_{10}
Molar mass	70.135 g·mol^{−1}
Density	0.64 g/cm^{3} (1-pentene)
Melting point	−165.2 °C (−265.4 °F; 108.0 K) (1-pentene)
Boiling point	30 °C (86 °F; 303 K) (1-pentene)
Magnetic susceptibility (χ)	−53.7·10^{−6} cm^{3}/mol

Hazards
Safety data sheet (SDS)	MSDS
- Except where otherwise noted, data are given for materials in their standard state (at 25 °C [77 °F], 100 kPa). verify (what is ?) Infobox references

Pentenes are alkenes with the chemical formula C_{5}H_{10}. Each molecule contains one double bond within its molecular structure. Six different compounds are in this class, differing from each other by whether the carbon atoms are attached linearly or in a branched structure and whether the double bond has a cis or trans form.

== Straight-chain isomers ==
1-Pentene is an alpha-olefin. Most often, 1-pentene is made as a byproduct of catalytic or thermal cracking of petroleum or during the production of ethylene and propylene via thermal cracking of hydrocarbon fractions.

As of 2010s, the only commercial manufacturer of 1-pentene was Sasol Ltd., where it is separated from crude by the Fischer-Tropsch process.

2-Pentene has two geometric isomers: cis-2-pentene and trans-2-pentene. Cis-2-Pentene is used in olefin metathesis.

== Branched-chain isomers ==
The branched isomers are 2-methylbut-1-ene, 3-methylbut-1-ene (isopentene), and 2-methylbut-2-ene (isoamylene).

Isoamylene is one of the three main byproducts of deep catalytic cracking (DCC), which is very similar to the operation of fluid catalytic cracking (FCC). The DCC uses vacuum gas oil (VGO) as a feedstock to produce primarily propylene, isobutylene, and isoamylene. The rise in demand for polypropylene has encouraged the growth of the DCC, which is operated very much like the FCC. Isobutylene and isoamylene feedstocks are necessary for the production of the much debated gasoline blending components methyl tert-butyl ether and tert-amyl methyl ether.

== Production of fuels ==
Propylene, isobutene, and amylenes are feedstocks in the alkylation units of refineries. Using isobutane, blendstocks are generated with high branching for good combustion characteristics. Amylenes are valued as precursors to fuels, especially aviation fuels of relatively low volatility, as required by various regulations.
