= 2-Methyl-2-butene =

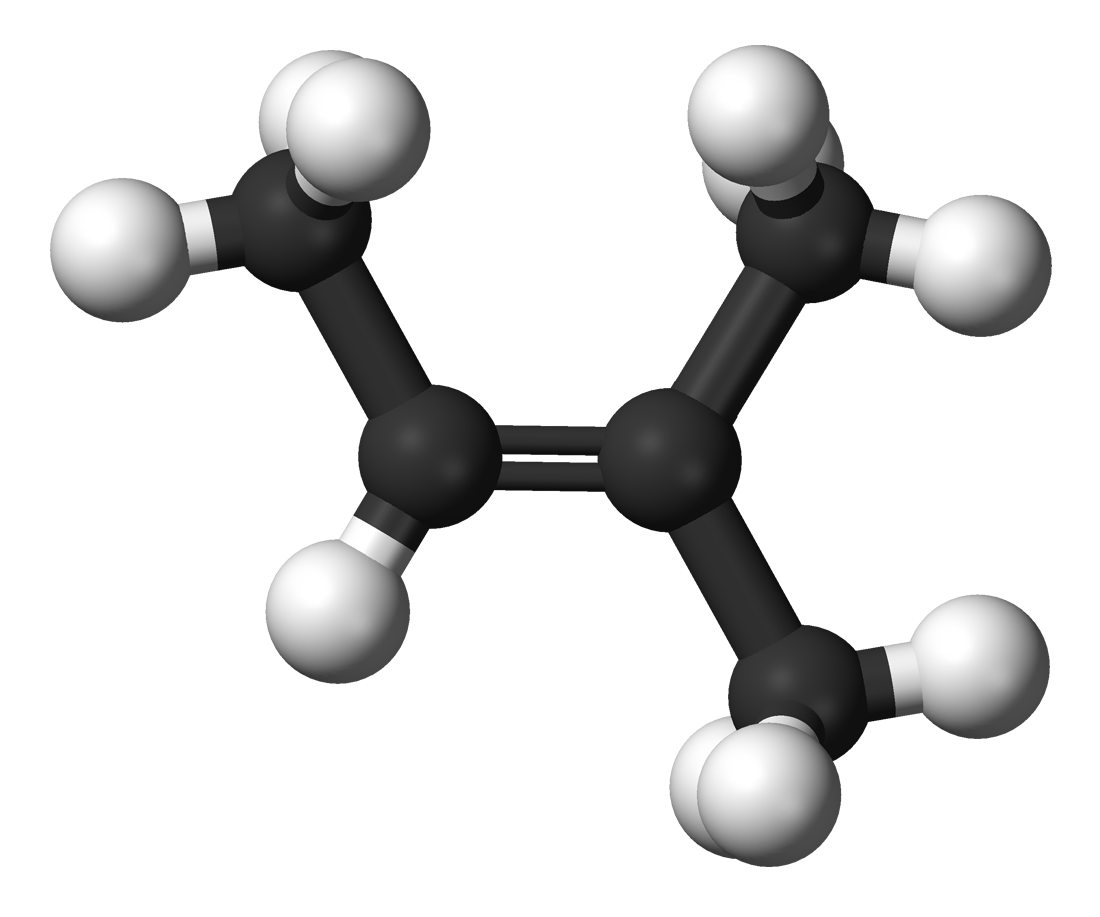

Names
- Preferred IUPAC name 2-Methylbut-2-ene
- Other names β-Isoamylene, Trimethylethylene, 2-Methyl-2-butene, Isoamylene, Isopentene.

Identifiers
CAS Number	513-35-9
3D model (JSmol)	Interactive image
ChemSpider	10113
ECHA InfoCard	100.007.416
PubChem CID	10553
UNII	HR68LQ4T3X
UN number	2460
CompTox Dashboard (EPA)	DTXSID8027165
- InChI: InChI=1S/C5H10/c1-4-5(2)3/h4H,1-3H3 Key: BKOOMYPCSUNDGP-UHFFFAOYSA-N; InChI=1/C5H10/c1-4-5(2)3/h4H,1-3H3 Key: BKOOMYPCSUNDGP-UHFFFAOYAE
- SMILES: C(=C(\C)C)\C

Properties
Chemical formula	C_{5}H_{10}
Molar mass	70.1329 g/mol
Appearance	Colorless liquid
Odor	Sweet
Density	0.662 g/cm^{3}
Melting point	−134 °C (−209 °F; 139 K)
Boiling point	39 °C (102 °F; 312 K)
Solubility in water	Slightly soluble
Solubility in alcohols, ether	Miscible
Magnetic susceptibility (χ)	−54.14·10^{−6} cm^{3}/mol
Refractive index (n_{D})	1.385

Hazards
- Occupational safety and health (OHS/OSH)
Main hazards	Mildly toxic, flammable
Flash point	< −45 °C (−49 °F; 228 K)
- Except where otherwise noted, data are given for materials in their standard state (at 25 °C [77 °F], 100 kPa). verify (what is ?) Infobox references

2-Methyl-2-butene, 2m2b, 2-methylbut-2-ene, beta-isoamylene, or trimethylethylene is an alkene hydrocarbon with the molecular formula C_{5}H_{10}. It is a flammable liquid.

Used as a free radical scavenger in trichloromethane and dichloromethane. It is also used to scavenge hypochlorous acid (HOCl) in the Pinnick oxidation.

John Snow, the English physician, experimented with it in the 1840s as an anesthetic.

A known use of isopentene is in the synthesis of pinacolone.

== See also ==
- Pentene
