= Cyclopentane =

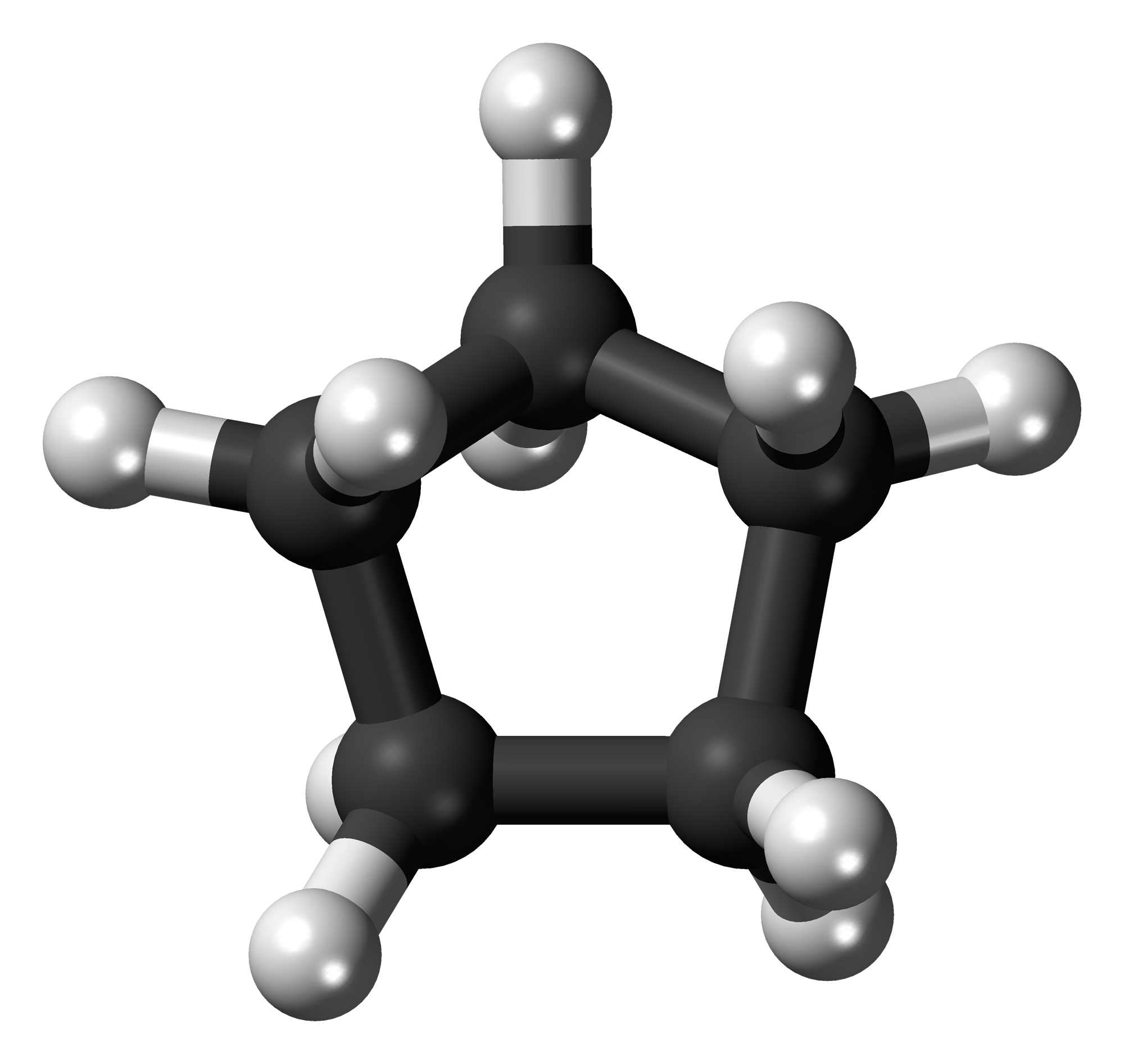
Cyclopentane
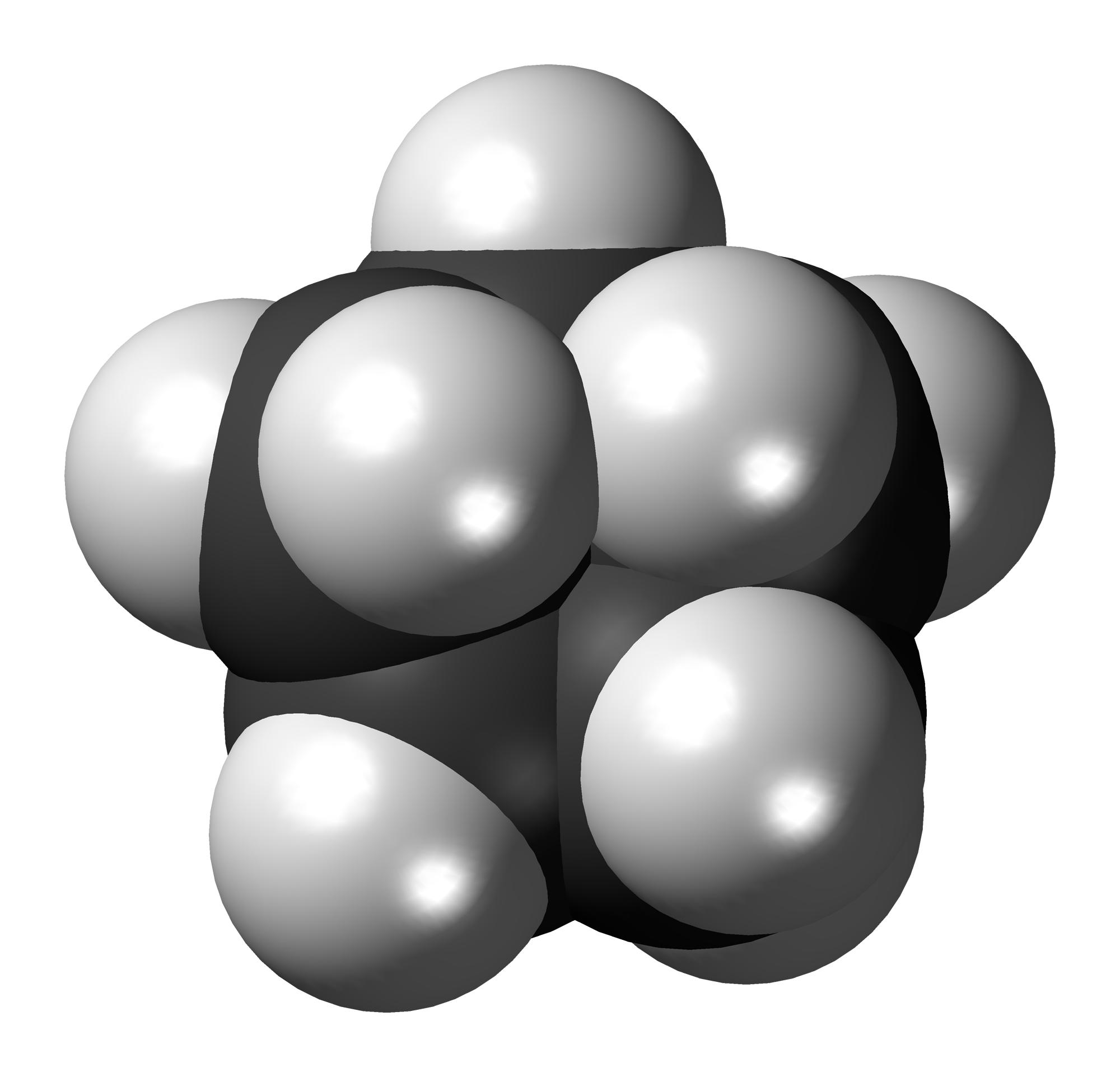
Cyclopentane

Names
- Preferred IUPAC name Cyclopentane
- Other names pentamethylene

Identifiers
CAS Number	287-92-3
3D model (JSmol)	Interactive image
ChEBI	CHEBI:23492
ChemSpider	8896
ECHA InfoCard	100.005.470
EC Number	206-016-6
PubChem CID	9253
RTECS number	GY2390000
UNII	T86PB90RNU
CompTox Dashboard (EPA)	DTXSID6024886
- InChI: InChI=1S/C5H10/c1-2-4-5-3-1/h1-5H2 Key: RGSFGYAAUTVSQA-UHFFFAOYSA-N; InChI=1/C5H10/c1-2-4-5-3-1/h1-5H2 Key: RGSFGYAAUTVSQA-UHFFFAOYA
- SMILES: C1CCCC1

Properties
Chemical formula	C_{5}H_{10}
Molar mass	70.135 g·mol^{−1}
Appearance	clear, colorless liquid
Odor	mild, sweet
Density	0.751 g/cm^{3}
Melting point	−93.9 °C (−137.0 °F; 179.2 K)
Boiling point	49.2 °C (120.6 °F; 322.3 K)
Solubility in water	156 mg·l^{−1} (25 °C)
Solubility	soluble in ethanol, acetone, ether
Vapor pressure	45 kPa (20 °C)
Acidity (pK_{a})	~45
Magnetic susceptibility (χ)	−59.18·10^{−6} cm^{3}/mol
Refractive index (n_{D})	1.4065

Hazards
- Occupational safety and health (OHS/OSH)
Main hazards	Flammable
NFPA 704 (fire diamond)	1 3 0
Flash point	−37.2 °C (−35.0 °F; 236.0 K)
Autoignition temperature	361 °C (682 °F; 634 K)
Explosive limits	1.1%–8.7%
- NIOSH (US health exposure limits)
PEL (Permissible)	none
REL (Recommended)	TWA 600 ppm (1720 mg/m^{3})
IDLH (Immediate danger)	N.D.

Related compounds
Related compounds	cyclopropane, cyclobutane, cyclohexane
- Except where otherwise noted, data are given for materials in their standard state (at 25 °C [77 °F], 100 kPa). verify (what is ?) Infobox references

Cyclopentane (also called C pentane) is a highly flammable alicyclic hydrocarbon with chemical formula C_{5}H_{10} and CAS number 287-92-3, consisting of a ring of five carbon atoms each bonded with two hydrogen atoms above and below the plane. It is a colorless liquid with a petrol-like odor. Its freezing point is −94 °C and its boiling point is 49 °C. Cyclopentane is in the class of cycloalkanes, being alkanes that have one or more carbon rings. It is formed by cracking cyclohexane in the presence of alumina at a high temperature and pressure.

It was first prepared in 1893 by the German chemist Johannes Wislicenus.

== Production, occurrence and use ==
Cycloalkanes are formed by catalytic reforming. For example, when passed over a hot platinum surface, 2-methylbutane converts into cyclopentane.

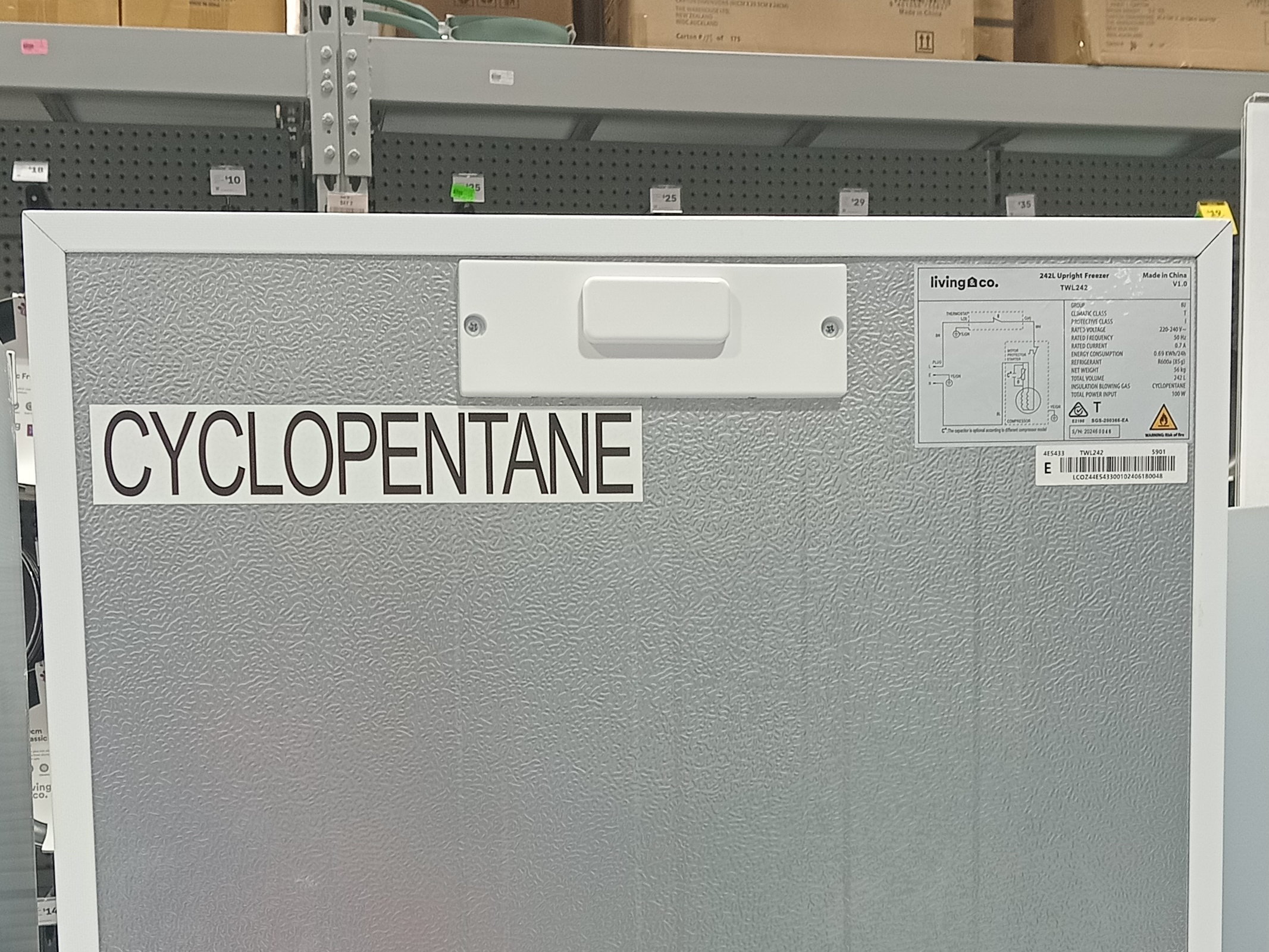
This prominent sign on the back of a refrigerator marks it as containing cyclopentane-based insulation

Cyclopentane is principally used as a blowing agent in the manufacture of polyurethane insulating foam, replacing ozone-depleting agents such as CFC-11 and HCFC-141b. While cyclopentane is not typically used as a refrigerant, it is common for domestic appliances that are insulated with cyclopentane-based foam, such as refrigerators and freezers, to be marked with cyclopentane warning labels due to its flammability. Cyclopentane is also used in the manufacture of synthetic resins and rubber adhesives.

Cyclopentane is a minor component of automobile fuel, with its share in US gasoline varying between 0.2 and 1.6% in early 1990s and 0.1 to 1.7% in 2011. Its research and motor octane numbers are reported as 101 or 103 and 85 or 86 respectively.

Multiple alkylated cyclopentane (MAC) lubricants, such as 1,3,4-tri-(2-octyldodecyl) cyclopentane, have low volatility and are used by NASA in space applications.

Cyclopentane requires safety precautions to prevent leakage and ignition as it is both highly flammable and can also cause respiratory arrest when inhaled.

Cyclopentane can be fluorinated to give compounds ranging from C_{5}H_{9}F to perfluorocyclopentane C_{5}F_{10}. Such species are conceivable refrigerants and specialty solvents.

The cyclopentane ring is pervasive in natural products including many useful drugs. Examples include most steroids, prostaglandins, and some lipids.

== Conformations ==
In a regular pentagon, the angles at the vertices are all 108°, slightly less than the bond angle in perfectly tetrahedrally bonded carbon, which is about 109.47°. However, cyclopentane is not planar in its normal conformations. It puckers in order to increase the distances between the hydrogen atoms (something which does not happen in the planar cyclopentadienyl anion C_{5}H^{−}_{5} because it doesn't have as many hydrogen atoms). This means that the average C-C-C angle is less than 108°. There are two conformations that give local minima of the energy, the "envelope" and the "half-chair" (occurring in two enantiomorphs). The envelope has mirror symmetry (C_{s}), while the half chair has two-fold rotational symmetry (C_{2}). In both cases the symmetry implies that there are two pairs of equal C-C-C angles and one C-C-C angle that has no pair. In fact for cyclopentane, unlike for cyclohexane (C_{6}H_{12}, see cyclohexane conformation) and higher cycloalkanes, it is not possible geometrically for all the angles and bond lengths to be equal except if it is in the form of a flat regular pentagon.

Envelope

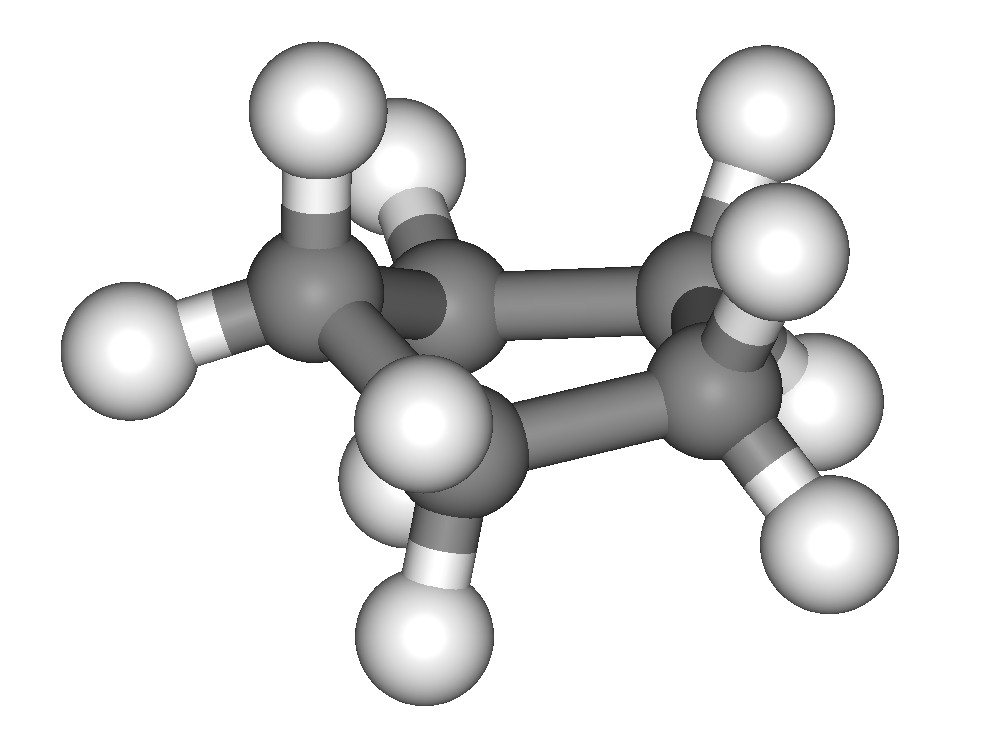
3D envelope

Half-chair
