= Methylcyclobutane =

Names
- Preferred IUPAC name Methylcyclobutane
- Other names 1-Methylcyclobutane

Identifiers
CAS Number	598-61-8
3D model (JSmol)	Interactive image
ChemSpider	11232
PubChem CID	11725
UNII	25U6128F4M
CompTox Dashboard (EPA)	DTXSID4073916
- InChI: InChI=1S/C5H10/c1-5-3-2-4-5/h5H,2-4H2,1H3 Key: BDJAEZRIGNCQBZ-UHFFFAOYSA-N
- SMILES: CC1CCC1

Properties
Chemical formula	C_{5}H_{10}
Molar mass	70.135 g·mol^{−1}
Appearance	Colorless liquid
Density	0.748 g/cm^{3}
Melting point	−135.7 °C (−212.3 °F; 137.5 K)
Boiling point	36.3 °C (97.3 °F; 309.4 K)
Solubility in water	insoluble
- Except where otherwise noted, data are given for materials in their standard state (at 25 °C [77 °F], 100 kPa). Infobox references

Methylcyclobutane is an organic compound with the chemical formula C_{5}H_{10}. This is a cycloalkane consisting of a four-membered cyclobutane core substituted with a methyl group. It is a colorless, volatile liquid at room temperature and is primarily of interest in fundamental organic chemistry research, particularly in studies of ring strain and reaction mechanisms.

== Synthesis ==
- Wurtz-type coupling: Reaction of 1,3-dibromopropane with methylene iodide and sodium metal yields methylcyclobutane, though this method suffers from low yields due to competing elimination and polymerization.
- Cycloaddition reactions: Photochemical cycloaddition of propene with ethylene or diazomethane-derived cyclopropanation followed by ring expansion can produce substituted cyclobutanes, including methylcyclobutane.

== Physical properties ==
Methylcyclobutane is a volatile, flammable liquid with a characteristic hydrocarbon odor. The compound is nonpolar and insoluble in water, but miscible with common organic solvents such as diethyl ether, ethanol, and benzene. Decomposes upon heating.

The compound is toxic.
