= Johann Jakob Wepfer =

Swiss pathologist (1620–1695)

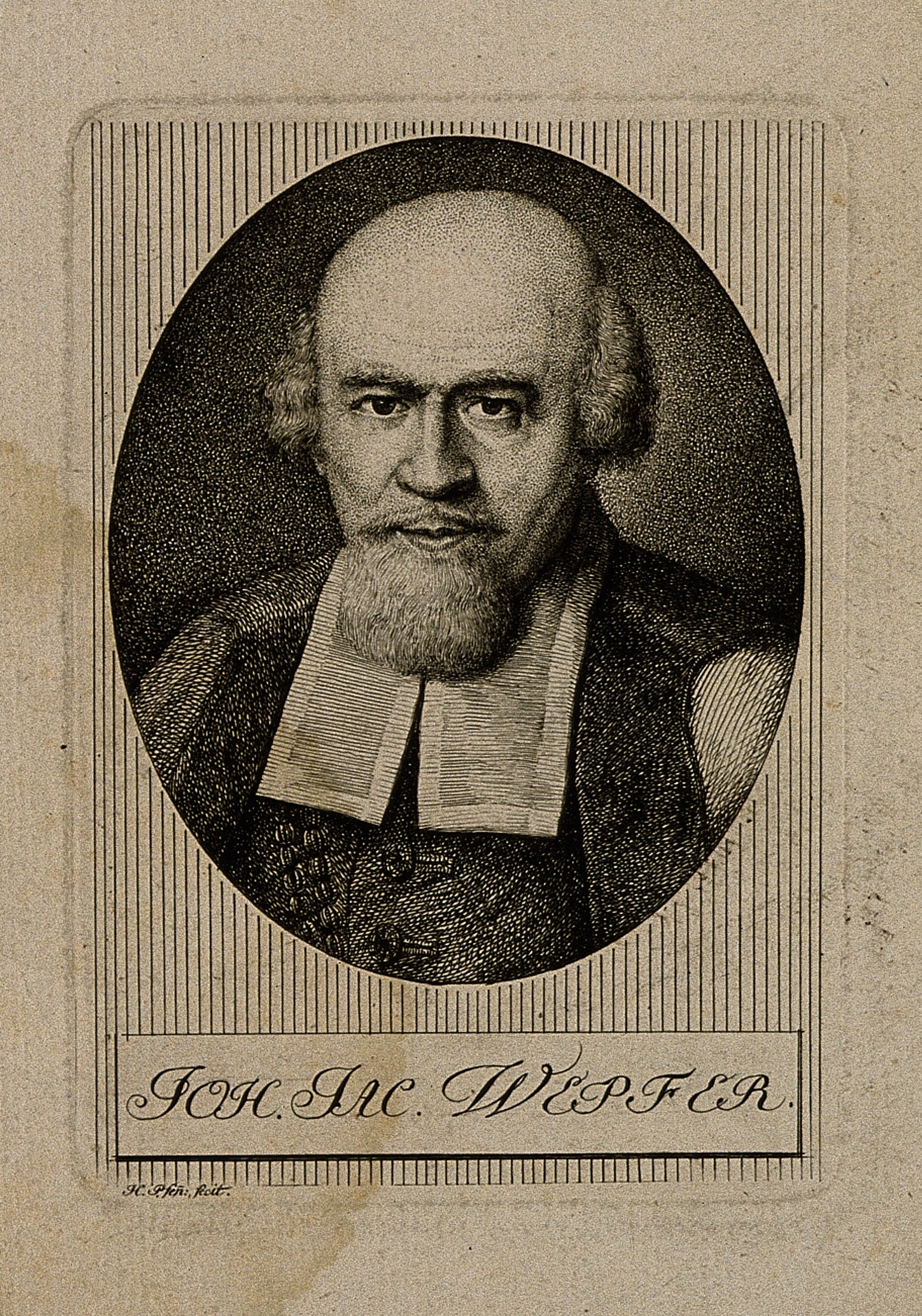
Engraving of Johann Jakob Wepfer

Johann Jakob Wepfer (December 23, 1620 – January 26, 1695) was a Swiss pathologist and pharmacologist who was a native of Schaffhausen.

He studied medicine in Strasbourg, Basel and Padua, and in 1647 returned to Schaffhausen to practice medicine. Here he maintained a practice that extended into southern Germany. During his career he also served as a private physician and consultant to various members of royalty.

Wepfer is remembered for his work involving vascular anatomy of the brain, and the study of cerebrovascular disease. He was the first physician to hypothesize that the effects of a stroke were caused by bleeding in the brain. He also mentioned that these symptoms could be caused by a blockage of one of the main arteries that supply blood to the brain. From postmortem studies, he provided information on the carotid and vertebral arteries that supply the brain with blood. in 1658 he published a classic treatise on strokes, titled Historiae apoplecticorum.

Wepfer made important contributions in the fields of experimental pharmacology and toxicology. He conducted experiments on the toxicity of water hemlock, hellebore, monkshood, and warned against the usage of arsenic, antimony, and mercury in medicine. In the fields of pharmacology/toxicology he published an influential work on water and poison hemlock called Cicutae aquaticae historia et noxae (1679). This contained the first reports of toxicity of plants from the genus Cicuta, ultimately attributed to compounds such as cicutoxin and oenanthotoxin. Since 2005, an annual award for stroke research named after Wepfer has been awarded at the European stroke conference.
