= Cicutoxin =

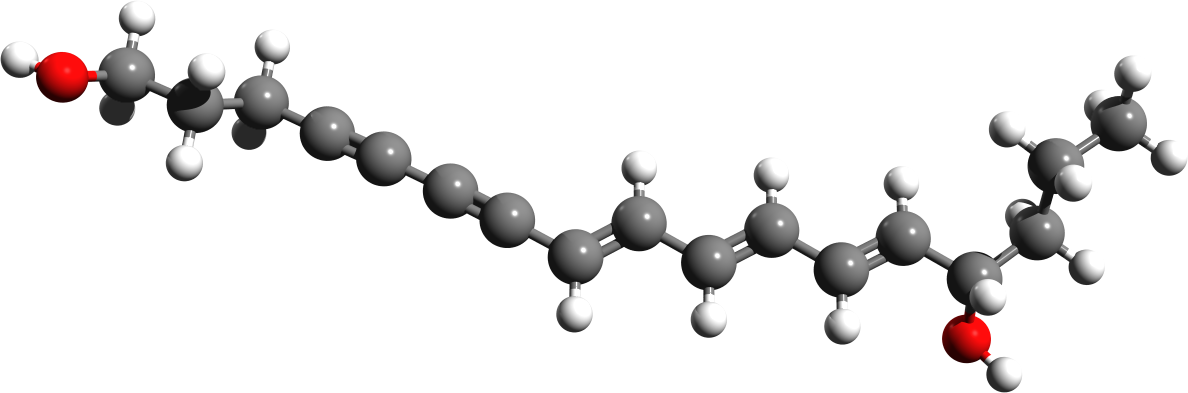

Names
- Preferred IUPAC name (8E,10E,12E,14R)-Heptadeca-8,10,12-triene-4,6-diyne-1,14-diol

Identifiers
CAS Number	505-75-9
3D model (JSmol)	Interactive image
ChEBI	CHEBI:3695
ChEMBL	ChEMBL140367
ChemSpider	23215724
KEGG	C08402
PubChem CID	25265910
UNII	6F9YP2TYQ0
CompTox Dashboard (EPA)	DTXSID30896918
- InChI: InChI=1S/C17H22O2/c1-2-14-17(19)15-12-10-8-6-4-3-5-7-9-11-13-16-18/h4,6,8,10,12,15,17-19H,2,11,13-14,16H2,1H3/b6-4+,10-8+,15-12+/t17-/m1/s1 Key: FQVNSJQTSOVRKZ-JNRDBWBESA-N
- SMILES: CCC[C@@H](O)\C=C\C=C\C=C\C#CC#CCCCO

Properties
Chemical formula	C_{17}H_{22}O_{2}
Molar mass	258.361 g·mol^{−1}
Density	1.025 g/mL
Melting point	54 °C (129 °F; 327 K) (single enantiomer); 67 °C (racemic mixture)
Boiling point	467.2 °C (873.0 °F; 740.3 K)
- Except where otherwise noted, data are given for materials in their standard state (at 25 °C [77 °F], 100 kPa). Infobox references

Cicutoxin is a naturally-occurring poisonous chemical compound produced by several plants from the family Apiaceae including water hemlock (Cicuta species) and water dropwort (Oenanthe crocata). The compound contains polyene, polyyne, and alcohol functional groups and is a structural isomer of oenanthotoxin (also found in water dropwort) and bupleurotoxin (found in Bupleurum longiradiatum). All of these belong to the C_{17}-polyacetylenes chemical class.

It causes death by respiratory paralysis resulting from disruption of the central nervous system. It is a potent, noncompetitive antagonist of the gamma-aminobutyric acid (GABA) receptor. In humans, cicutoxin rapidly produces symptoms of nausea, emesis and abdominal pain, typically within 60 minutes of ingestion. This can lead to tremors, seizures, and death. LD_{50}(mouse; i.p.) ~9 mg/kg

== History ==
Johann Jakob Wepfer's book Cicutae Aquaticae Historia Et Noxae Commentario Illustrata was published in 1679; it contains the earliest published report of toxicity associated with Cicuta plants. The name cicutoxin was coined by Boehm in 1876 for the toxic compound arising from the plant Cicuta virosa, and he also extracted and named the isomeric toxin oenanthotoxin from Oenanthe crocata. A review published in 1911 examined 27 cases of cicutoxin poisoning, 21 of which had resulted in death – though some of these cases involved deliberate poisoning. This review included a case where a family of five used Cicuta extracts as a topical treatment for itching, resulting in the deaths of two children, a report that suggests that cicutoxin may be absorbed through the skin. A review from 1962 examined 78 cases, 33 of which resulted in death, and cases of cicutoxin poisoning continue to occur:

- A child used the stem of a plant as a toy whistle and died of cicutoxin poisoning
- A 14-year-old boy died 20 hours after consuming a 'wild carrot' in 2001
- In 1992, two brothers were foraging for wild ginseng and found a hemlock root. One of them ate three bites of the supposed ginseng root and the other one ingested one bite. The first brother died three hours later while the second made a full recovery with supportive medical care after experiencing seizures and delirium.

All plants from the genus Cicuta contain cicutoxin. These plants are found in swampy, wet habitats in North America and parts of Europe. The Cicuta plants are often mistaken for edible roots such as parsnip, wild carrot or wild ginseng. All parts of the Cicuta plants are poisonous, though the root is the most toxic part of the plant and toxin levels are highest in spring – ingestion of a 2–3 cm portion of root can be fatal to adults. In one reported incident, 17 boys ingested parts of the plant, with only those who consumed the root experiencing seizures whilst those who consumed only leaves and flowers merely became unwell. The toxicity of the plants depends on various factors, such as seasonal variation, temperature, geographical location and soil conditions. The roots remain toxic even after drying.

== Plants containing cicutoxin ==
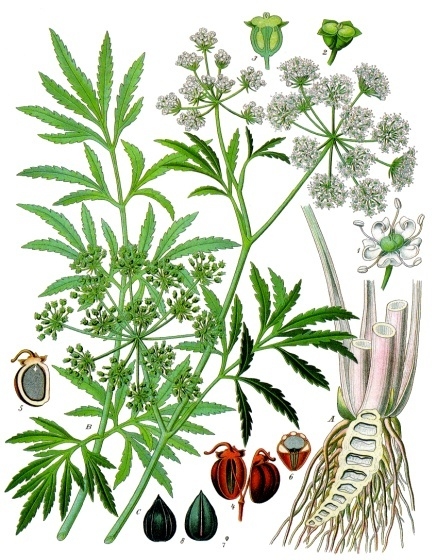
Cicuta virosa, Mackenzie's water hemlock

Cicutoxin is found in five species of water hemlock, all belonging to the family Apiaceae. These include all four species in the genus Cicuta and one species from the genus Oenanthe: the bulblet-bearing water hemlock, C. bulbifera; the Douglas water hemlock, C. douglasii; the spotted water hemlock or spotted cowbane, C. maculata; Mackenzie's water hemlock, C. virosa; and, the water dropwort, O. crocata. Cicutoxin is found in all parts of these plants, along with several other C_{17} polyacetylenes. C. virosa, for example, produces isocicutoxin, a geometric isomer of cicutoxin, while O. crocata contains the toxin oenanthotoxin, a structural isomer of cicutoxin. Cicuta plants also produce multiple congeners of cicutoxin, such as Virol A and Virol C.

== Chemistry ==
Building on Boehm's work, Jacobsen reported the first isolation of pure cicutoxin as a yellowish oil in 1915. Its chemical structure was not determined until 1953, however, when it was shown that it has a molecular formula of C_{17}H_{22}O_{2} and it is an aliphatic, highly unsaturated alcohol with two triple bonds conjugated with three double bonds, and two hydroxyl groups. The first synthesis of cicutoxin was reported in 1955. Though the overall yield was only 4% and the product was the racemic mixture, the synthesis has been described as "a significant accomplishment" given that it was achieved "without the benefit of modern coupling reactions". The absolute configuration of the naturally occurring form of cicutoxin was reported in 1999 to be (R)-(−)-cicutoxin, systematically named as (8E,10E,12E,14R)-heptadeca-8,10,12-triene-4,6-diyne-1,14-diol. Outside of a plant, cicutoxin breaks down when exposed to air, light, or heat, making it difficult to handle.

Cicutoxin has a long carbon structure and few hydrophilic substituents which gives it hydrophobic characteristics. Hydrophobic and/or small molecules can be absorbed through the skin. Research has shown that cicutoxin will pass through the skin of frogs and the experience of the family who used a Cicuta plant as a topical antipruritic strongly suggests that the compound is able to pass through human skin.

=== Laboratory synthesis ===
The first total synthesis of racemic cicutoxin was published in 1955 and reported that this racemate was about twice as active as the naturally occurring enantiomer. A complete synthesis of the natural product, (R)-(−)-cicutoxin, in four linear steps was reported in 1999, from three key fragments: (R)-(−)-1-hexyn-3-ol (8), 1,4-diiodo-1,3-butadiene (9), and THP-protected 4,6-heptadiyn-1-ol (6). (R)-(−)-1-hexyn-3-ol (8) is a known compound and was obtained by Corey-Bakshi-Shibata reduction of 1-hexyn-3-one. 1,4-diiodo-1,3-butadiene (9) is also a known compound and it is readily available by dimerization of acetylene accompanied by addition of iodine in the presence of platinum (IV) catalyst and sodium iodide. The last key fragment, THP-protected 4,6-heptadiyn-1-ol (6) is a known compound.

The first step is the Sonogashira coupling of compound 8 and 9. This step gave dienynol (10) with 63 percent yield. The second step is a palladium-catalyzed coupling reaction. The coupling of compound 6 and 10 leads to the 17-carbon frame (11) with 74 percent yield. Compound 11 already has the stereo center in place and only needs a few structural changes: the third and fourth step. The third step is the reduction of the C5 triple bond in compound 11, this was accomplished by using a compound called Red-Al. The last step is the removal of the THP protection group. When THP is removed and a hydrogen is bound to the oxygen, then (R)-(−)-cicutoxin is formed. These four steps are the full synthesis of cicutoxin and gives an overall yield of 18 percent.

== Biochemistry ==
Cicutoxin is known to interact with the GABA_{A} receptor and it also has been shown to block the potassium channel in T lymphocytes. A similar effect where potassium channels in neurons are blocked could account for the toxic effect on the nervous system. The interactions are explained in Mechanism of action.

=== Mechanism of action ===
The exact mechanism of action is not known for cicutoxin, even though it is well known to be a violent toxin. The mechanism is not known because of the chemical instability of cicutoxin, but there have been studies that delivered some evidence for a mechanism of action.

Cicutoxin is a noncompetitive gamma-aminobutyric acid (GABA) antagonist in the central nervous system (CNS). GABA normally binds to the beta domain of the GABA_{A} receptor and activates the receptor which causes a flow of chloride across the membrane. Cicutoxin binds to the same place as GABA, because of this the receptor is not activated by GABA. The pore of the receptor won't open and chloride can't flow across the membrane. Binding of cicutoxin to the beta domain also blocks the chloride channel. Both effects of cicutoxin on the GABA_{A}-receptor cause a constant depolarization. This causes hyperactivity in cells, which leads to seizures.

There also have been some studies that suggest that cicutoxin increases the duration of the neuronal repolarization in a dose-dependent manner. The toxin could increase the duration of the repolarization up to sixfold at 100 μmol/L. The prolonged action potentials may cause higher excitatory activity.

It has been demonstrated that cicutoxin also blocks potassium channels in T-lymphocytes. The toxin inhibits the proliferation of the lymphocytes. This has made it a substance of interest in research for a medicine against leukemia.

=== Metabolism ===
It is unknown how the body gets rid of cicutoxin. There is evidence that it has a long half-life in the body, because of a patient who was submitted in a hospital after eating a root of a Cicuta plant. The man was in the hospital for two days and still had a fuzzy feeling in his head two days after leaving the hospital. There is also the case of a sheep (discussed in Effects on animals) where the sheep fully recovered after seven days.

== Poisoning ==
=== Symptoms ===
First signs of cicutoxin poisoning start 15–60 minutes after ingestion and are: vomiting, convulsions, widened pupils, salivation, excess sweating. It may cause coma. Other described symptoms are cyanosis, amnesia, absence of muscle reflexes, metabolic acidosis and cardiovascular changes which may cause heart problems and central nervous system problems which manifest themselves as convulsions and either an overactive or underactive heart. Due to an overactive nervous system respiratory failure occurs which may cause suffocation and accounts for most of the deaths. Dehydration from water loss due to vomiting can also occur. If untreated, the kidneys can also fail, causing death.

=== Treatment ===
The adverse effects from cicutoxin poisoning are gastrointestinal or cardiac nature. With no antidote known, only symptomatic treatments are available, though supportive treatments do substantially improve survival rates. Treatments used include the administration of activated charcoal within 30 minutes of ingestion to reduce the uptake of poison, maintaining open airways to prevent suffocation, rehydration to address the dehydration caused by vomiting, and administration of benzodiazepines that enhance the effect of GABA on the GABA_{A} receptor or barbiturates to reduce seizures.

=== Effects on animals ===
The LD_{50} of cicutoxin for mice is 2.8 mg/kg (10.8 μmol/kg). In comparison, the LD_{50} of virol A is 28.0 mg/kg (109 μmol/kg) and of isocicutoxin is 38.5 mg/kg (149 μmol/kg).

Cattle usually ingest parts of Cicuta plants in Spring, while grazing on new growth around ditches and rivers where these plants grow. Animals display similar effects of cicutoxin poisoning as do humans, but without vomiting (which can lead to increased lethality) – recorded symptoms include salivation, seizures, frequent urination and defecation, and degeneration of skeletal and cardiac muscles. Seizures are usually short, less than a minute per seizure, and occur at intervals of 15 to 30 minutes for around two hours. Ewes recover more slowly after eating cicutoxin-containing tubers, taking up to seven days to recover fully.

Research studies on ewes has shown that skeletal and cardiac myodegeneration (damage of muscle tissues) only occur after a dose sufficient to induce symptoms of intoxication is administered. Analysis of the animal's blood showed elevated serum enzymes that indicate muscle damage (LDH, AST and CK values). At necropsy, the ewe's heart had multifocal pale areas and pallor of the long digital extensor muscle groups; by contrast, a ewe given a lethal dose of cicutoxin-containing tubers had only microscopic lesions. The number and duration of seizures had a direct effect on the skeletal and cardiac myodegeneration and amount of serum change.

Ewes given up to 2.5 times the lethal dose along with medications to treat symptoms of cicutoxin poisoning recovered, demonstrating that symptomatic treatment can be life-saving. Medications administered included sodium pentobarbital (at 20–77 mg/kg intravenously) at the first seizure to control seizure activity, atropine (75–150 mg) to reduce salivary excretion during anesthesia, and Ringer's lactate solution until the ewes recovered.

== Medical use ==
Cicutoxin has been shown to have anti-leukemia properties as it inhibits the proliferation of the lymphocytes. It has also been investigated for antitumor activity, where it was shown that a methanolic extract of C. maculata demonstrated significant cytotoxicity in the 9 KB (human nasopharyngeal carcinoma) cell structure assay.

== Additional references ==
- E. Anet; B. Lythgoe; M. H. Silk; S. Trippett (1952). "The Chemistry of Oenanthotoxin and Cicutoxin". Chemistry & Industry. 31: 757–758.
- O. H. Knutsen; P. Paszkowski (1984). "New aspects in the treatment of water hemlock poisoning". Clin. Toxicol. 22 (2): 157–166. doi:10.3109/15563658408992551. PMID 6502788.
