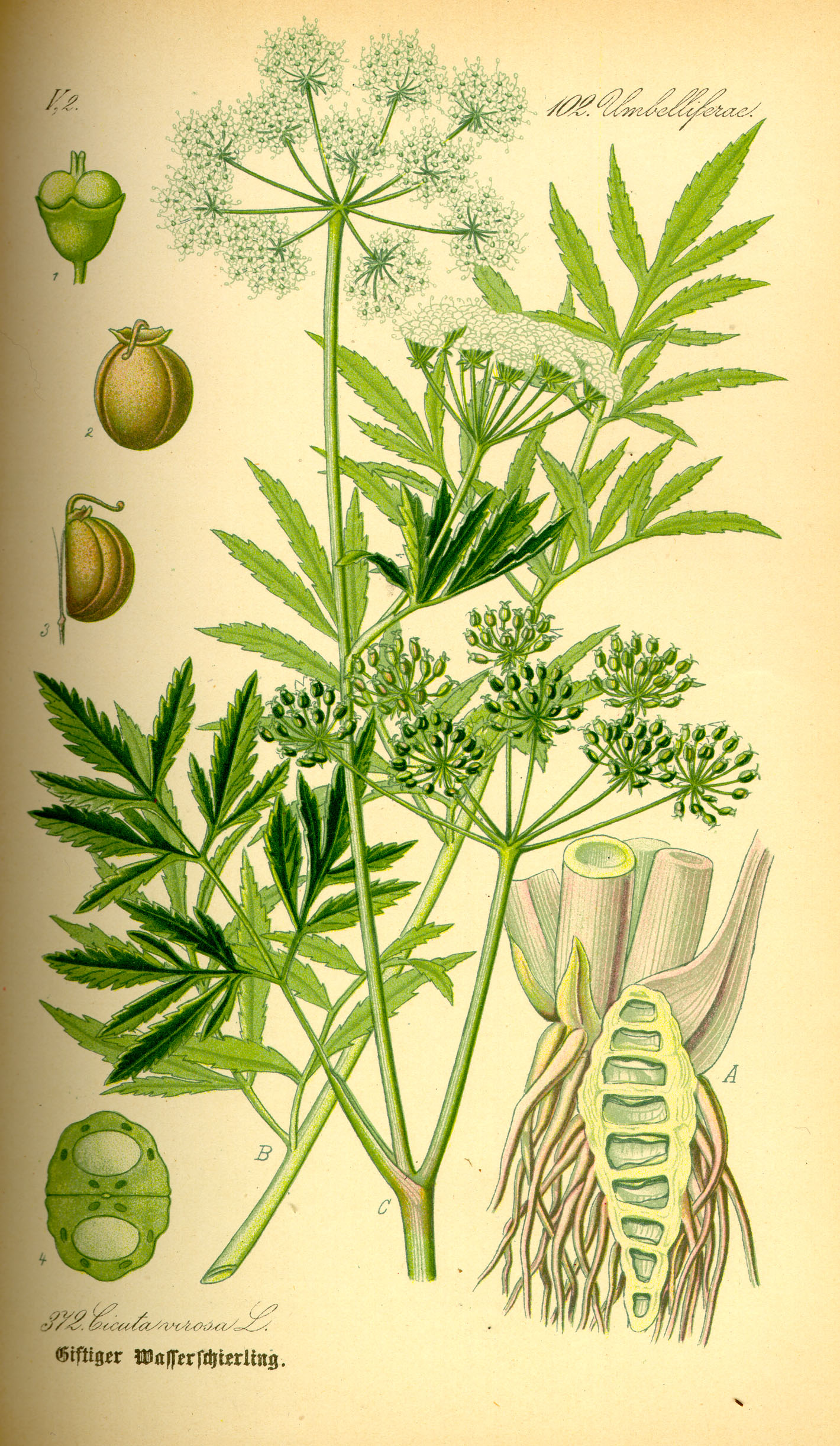
- Cicuta virosa

Scientific classification
- Kingdom: Plantae
- Clade: Embryophytes
- Clade: Tracheophytes
- Clade: Spermatophytes
- Clade: Angiosperms
- Clade: Eudicots
- Clade: Asterids
- Order: Apiales
- Family: Apiaceae
- Subfamily: Apioideae
- Tribe: Oenantheae
- Genus: Cicuta; L.

Type species
- Cicuta virosa L.

Species
- Cicuta bulbifera; Cicuta douglasii; Cicuta maculata; Cicuta virosa

= Cicuta =

Genus of plants

Cicuta, commonly known as water hemlock, is a genus of four species of highly poisonous plants in the family Apiaceae. They are perennial herbaceous plants which grow up to 2.5 meters (8 ft) tall, having distinctive small green or white flowers arranged in an umbrella shape (umbel). Plants in this genus may also be referred to as cowbane or poison parsnip. Cicuta is native to temperate regions of the Northern Hemisphere, mainly North America and Europe, typically growing in wet meadows, along streambanks and other wet and marshy areas. In the United Kingdom it is frequently found along canals. These plants bear a close resemblance to other members in the family Apiaceae and may be confused with a number of edible or poisonous plants. The common name hemlock may also be confused with poison hemlock (Conium maculatum), or with the Hemlock tree.

Water hemlock is considered one of the most toxic plants in North America and Europe, being highly poisonous to humans. Three members of the genus contain a toxin named cicutoxin which causes central nervous system stimulatory effects including seizures following ingestion. Medical treatment of poisoning may include the use of activated charcoal to decrease gastrointestinal absorption of the toxic principle along with supportive care including anticonvulsant drugs such as a benzodiazepine. High doses of anticonvulsant medicine are often required to halt seizure activity and further medical care including intubation and mechanical ventilation may be required.

== Description ==
Cicuta spp. are biennial plants that are all similar in morphology, growing up to a maximum of 2.5 meters (8 ft) in height. The stem of the plant is branching, erect, smooth and hollow (except for partitions at the junction of the leaves and stem), sometimes being purple-striped, or mottled (typically only C. maculata has the purple stripes or spots). Attached to the base of the stem is a tuberous root with thickened rootstocks. The rootstocks are multichambered and contain a yellowish oily liquid which turns reddish brown on exposure to air and emits a characteristic smell of raw parsnip. The alternate leaves are two or three pinnately compound and may reach 30–90 cm (12–35 in) in length. The leaflets are lanceolate, serrate, 5–10 cm (2–4 in) in length, and sharply toothed. The plant flowers in spring or early summer; the flowers are small with green or white petals clustered in an umbrella shape (umbel) characteristic to this family; the umbel measures 5–10 cm (2–4 in) across. The plants produce a cylindrical fruit which is 4–6 mm (5/32–1/4 in) in length. The plant is spread primarily by seeds which are produced in large numbers and are small in size.

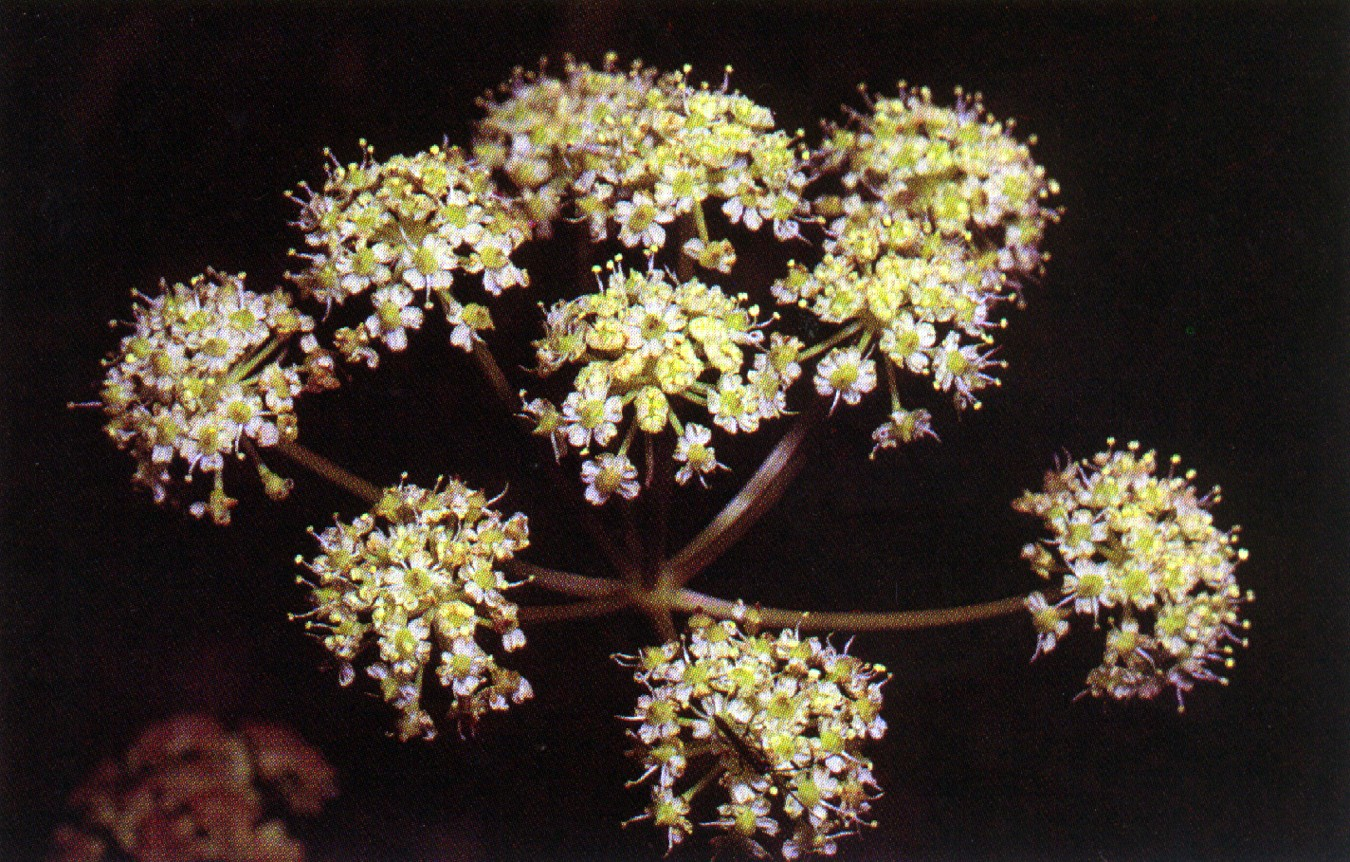
Cicuta douglasii, showing the umbrella shaped umbel of flowers

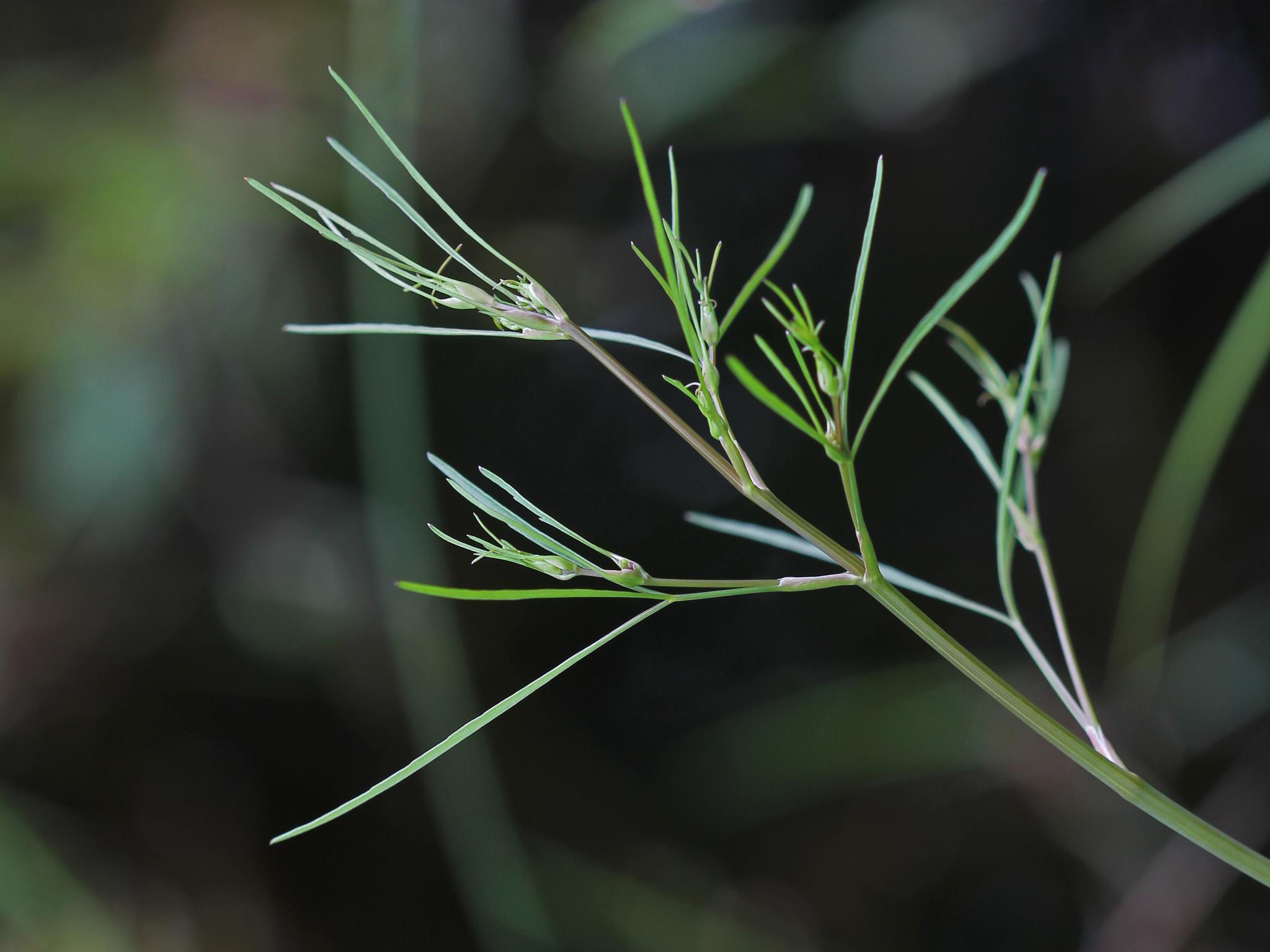
Cicuta bulbifera

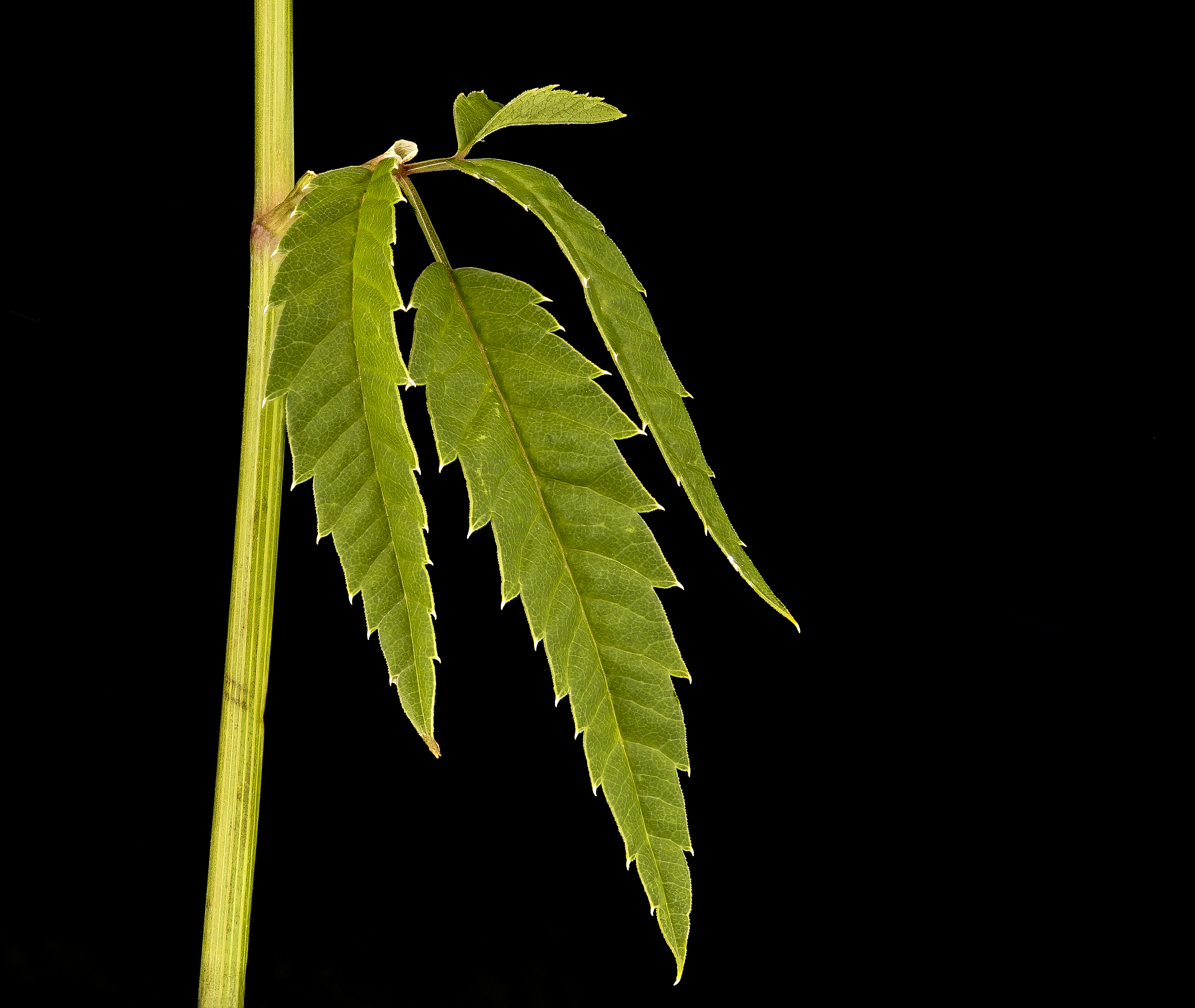
Leaves of Cicuta maculata

== Taxonomy ==
The genus Cicuta is one of many genera in the family Apiaceae, which is in the order Apiales. Apiaceae is also known as Umbelliferae, and both of these family names are permitted to be used by the International Code of Nomenclature for algae, fungi, and plants. In Europe, Cicuta was not distinguished from the similar genus Conium before the year 1500. The first mention of the genus in the United States was in the eighteenth century. Carl Linnaeus formally described three species in 1753. The type species is Cicuta virosa. The genus is now recognized to comprise four species:

Species Name	Common name
Cicuta bulbifera L.	bulblet-bearing water hemlock, bulbous water hemlock
Cicuta douglasii (DC.) Coult. & Rose	Douglas water hemlock, western water hemlock
Cicuta maculata L.	spotted cowbane, spotted parsley, spotted water hemlock
Cicuta virosa L.	cowbane, Mackenzie's water hemlock, northern water hemlock

Other species names such as Cicuta bolanderi, Cicuta californica, and Cicuta curtissii are older names now recognized to be varieties of the widespread, morphologically variable Cicuta maculata. Cicuta maculata is now recognized to have four varieties: var. maculata, var. angustifolia, var. victorinii, and var. bolanderi. Phylogenetic analysis using the sequences of nuclear ribosomal DNA internal transcribed spacer (ITS) loci was not conclusive but seems to show that C. bulbifera and C. virosa are monophyletic, while C. douglasii may not be. It was also suggested a specimen from California may warrant recognition as a distinct species. Other common names for the genus in general include poison parsnip, beaver poison, wild carrot, wild parsnip, and false parsley.

== Similar species ==
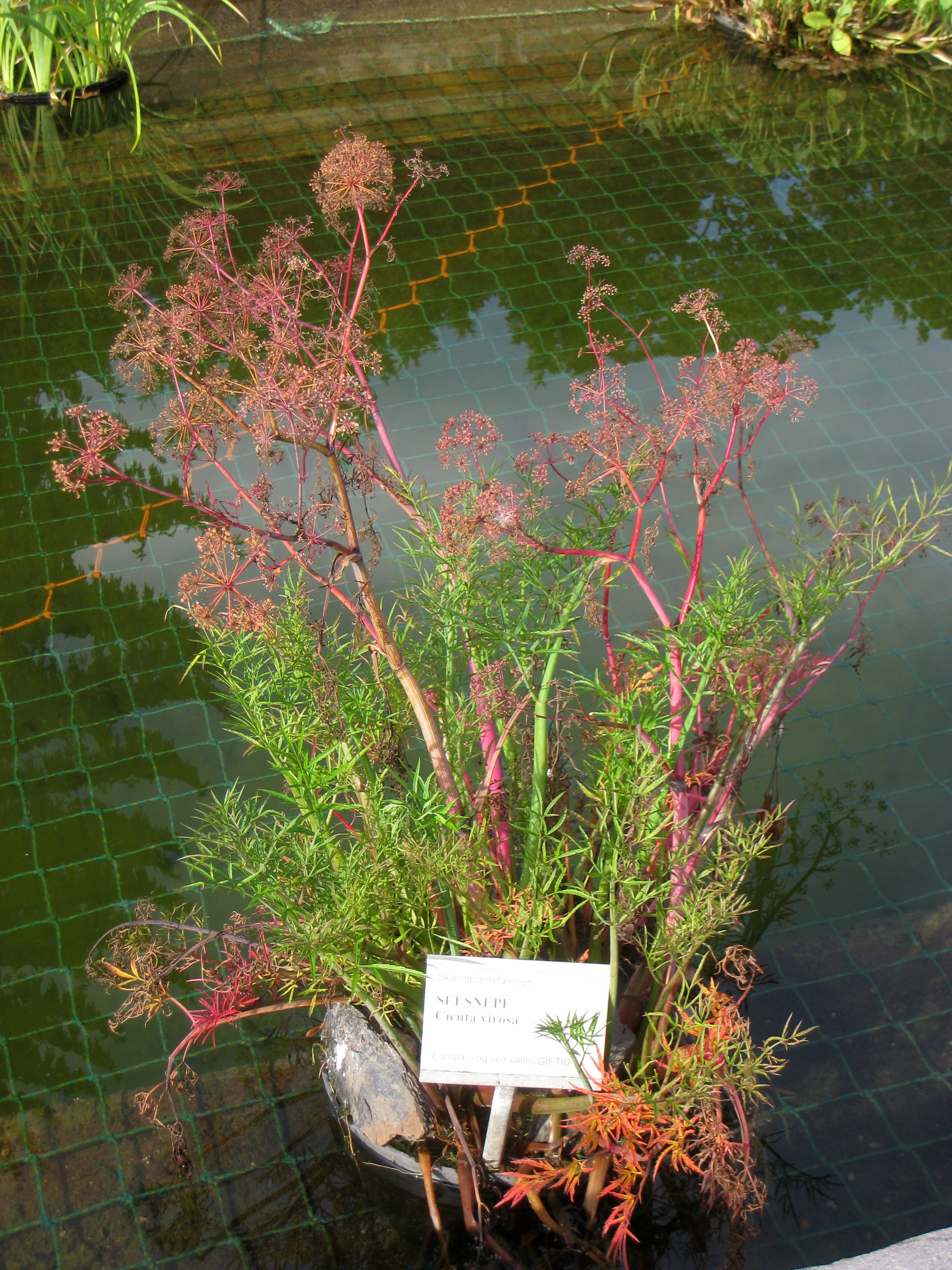
Cicuta virosa

Members of the family Apiaceae bear close resemblance to each other, and have many characteristics in common. Cicuta spp. are often mistaken for edible plants such as wild celery (Angelica archangelica), celery (Apium graveolens), pignut (Conopodium majus), wild carrot (Daucus carota), wild parsnip (Pastinaca sativa), and water parsnip (Berula spp.). One of the more common misidentifications is between water hemlock and water parsnip; both have clusters of small white flowers shaped like umbrellas, and both have the same habitat near the shoreline of lakes and rivers. Differences between water parsnip and water hemlock include the water parsnip having leaves only once compound while the water hemlock has leaves which are two or three times compound. Water hemlock also has a large swelling at the stem base which water parsnip lacks. Additionally, water hemlock has bracts at the base of each small flower cluster, not at the base of the main flower head, while water parsnip has both bracts at the base of flowers and also at the main flower head.

Additionally, there can be confusion between the various water hemlock species and poison hemlock (Conium maculatum) as the common name hemlock is applied to both Cicuta and Conium maculatum. Both are poisonous and can be differentiated by differences in their root structure. Water hemlock has a branched root systems with tubules, while poison hemlock has a single tap root. Another reliable method to identify water hemlock is to examine the leaf veins. Water hemlock is unique in the family Apiaceae in that it has leaf veins which terminate in the notches between the leaf tips, rather than extend to the tip of the leaf, as is found in the leaf structure of other members of this family.

== Distribution and habitat ==
Cicuta spp. are found growing across North America and Europe. Typically, they grow in wet habitats usually alongside ponds and streams, in marshes or swamps, or areas that are swampy at least part of the year. Plants can also be found growing in water. Of the four species, Cicuta maculata has the most widespread distribution occurring across the majority of North America. Cicuta bulbifera also has a relatively large distribution, found throughout Northern North America. Cicuta douglasii is found in the northwest corner of North America, while Cicuta virosa is found in central and northern Europe (including the British Isles), northern Eurasia, and in the far north of North America.

== Toxicity ==
Cicutoxin is the major poison in Cicuta spp. plants.

All members of Cicuta contain high levels of the poisonous principle cicutoxin, an unsaturated aliphatic alcohol that is structurally closely related to the toxin oenanthotoxin found in the plant hemlock water dropwort. Cicutoxin is present at all stages of growth and in all parts of the plant, but is most concentrated in the roots which appear to be the most toxic in the early spring. Its primary toxic effect is to act as a stimulant in the central nervous system. It is a non-competitive gamma-aminobutyric acid (GABA) receptor antagonist. Cicutoxin acts on the GABA_{A} receptor causing a block of the chloride channel which results in neuronal depolarization. In the presence of cicutoxin, this depolarization continues unabated, causing cell overactivity. This hyperactivity in brain cells results in seizures. Cicutoxin is very poisonous, and water hemlock is considered one of North America's most toxic plants. Ingestion of Cicuta can be fatal in humans, and there are reports in medical literature of severe poisoning and death as early as 1670. A number of people have also died following ingestion of the plant in the 20th and 21st century.

The LD_{50} in mice administered cicutoxin by intraperitoneal injection is 48.3 milligrams per kilogram body weight; this compares with 5.9 mg/kg for mice given potassium cyanide by intraperitoneal injection, while the LD_{50} for arsenic via intraperitoneal injection in mice is 46.2 mg/kg. The exact toxic dose of plant material in humans is unknown; it is thought ingestion of water hemlock in any quantity can result in poisoning, and very small amounts may lead to death. Poisoning has been reported following children blowing whistles made from the hollow stem of water hemlock plants. Intoxication has also been reported following skin contact with the plant; in one case, a family of five rubbed the plant onto the skin and were poisoned, with two children dying. Livestock have long been the worst affected, leading to the common name "cowbane". Poisoning in livestock is common and typically occurs following ingestion of roots of the plant. When the ground is soft in Spring, grazing animals tend to pull the entire plant out of the ground, ingesting both the foliage and the roots. Roots exposed by ploughing can also be the source of livestock poisonings. Ingestion of plant material may cause death in the animal in as little as 15 minutes.

=== Symptoms ===
Upon consumption, both in humans and other species, the symptoms of poisoning are characterized mainly by generalized seizures. The onset of symptoms following ingestion may be as soon as 15 minutes. Initial symptoms may include nausea, vomiting, abdominal pain, tremors, confusion, weakness, dizziness, and drowsiness, although the rapid onset of seizure activity may be the first sign presented following poisoning. Seizures are usually described as clonic or tonic–clonic. Complications of ongoing seizure activity include increased body temperature, decreases in the pH of the blood (metabolic acidosis), swelling in the brain, blood coagulation disorders, muscle breakdown (rhabdomyolysis), and kidney failure. Additional neurological symptoms may include hallucinations, delirium, tingling, pricking, or numbness of a person's skin, dilated pupils, and coma. Cardiovascular symptoms include alternating slow or fast heart rate and alternating low and high blood pressure. Other cardiac effects may include ECG abnormalities such as widening of the PR interval, supraventricular tachycardia, and ventricular fibrillation. Symptoms of excess salivation, wheezing, respiratory distress, and absence of breathing have also been reported.

Death is usually caused by respiratory failure or ventricular fibrillation secondary to ongoing seizure activity; fatalities have occurred within a few hours of ingestion. Poisoned people who recover usually regain consciousness and seizures cease within 24 to 48 hours of poisoning, although seizures may persist for up to 96 hours. There are occasional long-term effects, such as retrograde amnesia of the events leading to intoxication and the intoxication itself. Other ongoing mild effects may include restlessness, muscle weakness, twitching, and anxiety. Complete resolution of symptoms may take a number of days, or these ongoing symptoms may persist for months after poisoning.

=== Diagnosis and treatment ===
Water hemlock poisoning is usually diagnosed following a history of plant ingestion and symptoms of abrupt onset of seizures. Laboratory tests to determine the presence of cicutoxin in the blood such as spectrofluorimetry, high pressure liquid chromatography, thin layer chromatography, and mass spectrometry have been used to detect cicutoxin, but these tests are not performed routinely in hospital laboratories. If a sample of the plant ingested has been retained, diagnosis can be confirmed by having the plant identified by a botanist.

Initial treatment of poisoning may include gastrointestinal decontamination with activated charcoal. Decontamination is typically performed only if a potentially toxic amount of plant matter has been ingested up to one hour previously, and the patient has a normal intact airway or has been intubated. There is no specific antidote for water hemlock poisoning, and treatment consists mainly of supportive care. Treatment may include control of seizures with the administration of a benzodiazepine such as lorazepam or diazepam, or, if seizures are refractory to this treatment, a barbiturate such as phenobarbital is administered. The anticonvulsant phenytoin is not recommended, as it has not been shown to be effective for seizure control following water hemlock poisoning. Treatment with high doses of benzodiazepines or barbiturates may cause respiratory depression, and respiratory support including intubation and mechanical ventilation is required in these patients. Continuous electroencephalography monitoring is recommended in symptomatic patients.

Further treatment for complications of metabolic acidosis, rhabdomyolysis, hyperthermia, or low blood pressure may be required. Metabolic acidosis is treated by administering sodium bicarbonate. Low blood pressure is usually treated with intravenous fluid replacement, but the administration of dopamine or norepinephrine may be required to restore blood pressure. The management of rhabdomyolysis includes ensuring adequate hydration and urinary alkalinization; a complication of rhabdomyolysis is acute kidney injury, which may require management with hemodialysis. However, hemodialysis, hemoperfusion, or other extracorporeal techniques do not remove cicutoxin from the blood and are therefore not useful in enhancing elimination.

== See also ==
- Hemlock water-dropwort
- List of poisonous plants
