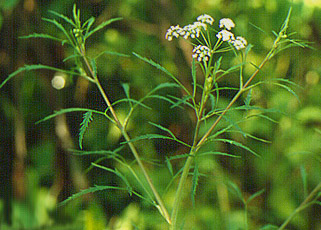

Conservation status
- Least Concern (IUCN 3.1)

- Secure (NatureServe)

Scientific classification
- Kingdom: Plantae
- Clade: Tracheophytes
- Clade: Angiosperms
- Clade: Eudicots
- Clade: Asterids
- Order: Apiales
- Family: Apiaceae
- Genus: Cicuta
- Species: C. bulbifera

Binomial name
- Cicuta bulbifera (L.) Spreng.

= Cicuta bulbifera =

Species of plant

Cicuta bulbifera, commonly known as the bulb-bearing water-hemlock, is a plant native to North America and one of four species in the poisonous genus Cicuta. Tiny bulbils form in the leaf joints in the upper part of the plant, giving the plant its scientific and common names. Cicuta bulbifera can be distinguished from Cicuta douglasii by its narrow leaflet segments (less than 1/4 of an inch wide) and its bulbil-bearing upper leaf axils.

== Morphology ==
This perennial plant reaches 1.5–3.5 feet (46–107 cm) tall with limited branching. The stems are light green to slightly reddish, glabrous, and glaucous from epicuticular wax. The compound, alternate leaves are green, also glaucous (excluding petioles), and up to 1 by 0.5 feet (30 by 15 cm), becoming smaller as they ascend the stems. Lower leaves are bipinnate, while the upper leaves are often simple-pinnate. The petioles of the lower leaves are long, but those of the shorter leaves are much shorter or even absent. Leaflets (pinnae) are up to 3 inches (7.6 cm) long and 0.33 inches (0.8 cm) across; they are linear to lanceolate-linear, dentate, and sometimes cleft into narrow lobes. The axils of the upper leaves often have sessile clusters of ovoid bulbils, capable of giving rise to new plants. The root system consists of a cluster of elongated fleshy roots.

The stems terminate into compound umbels of small white flowers, each of which spans about 2–4 inches (5.1–10.2 cm) across and comprises about 8 umbellets, themselves each composed of some 16 flowers. The entire inflorescence is bractless, although a small sessile leaf may occur near the base of it. Flowers are about 1/8 inch (3.2 mm) across and consist of 5 white petals, 5 stamens, 2 styles, and an ovary. The blooming period occurs during late summer to early fall and lasts about a month. There is no noticeable floral scent. Each seed is contained in a fruit of the same size as the original flower that is somewhat flattened, egg-shaped, and slightly notched at its apex.

== Distribution, habitat and ecology ==
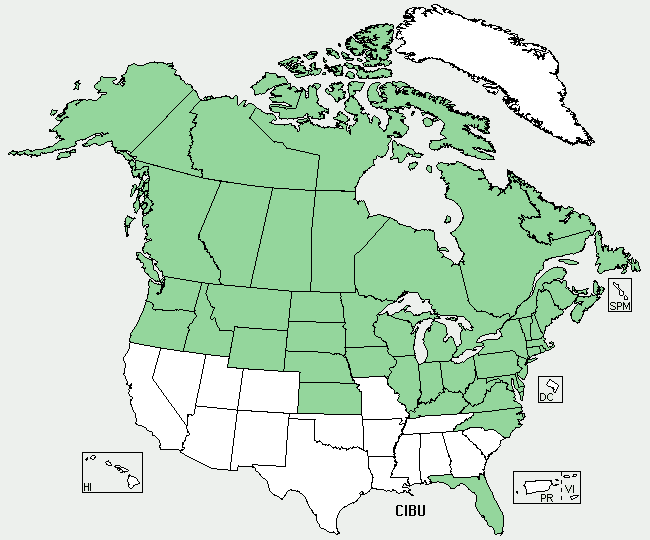
Native distribution

Cicuta bulbifera is native to North America and has a wide range of distribution from Newfoundland and Labrador to British Columbia in Canada, to Virginia, Indiana, Nebraska and Oregon in the United States.

A perennial, it reproduces by its seeds and bulbils. It grows along the edges of marshes and lake margins, in bogs, wet meadows, shallow standing water and along slow-moving streams. It can also grow on hummocks and floating mats, on partially submerged rotting logs, and is even known to grow on beaver dams. This species is normally found in high-quality wetlands.

== Toxicity ==
All plant parts are highly poisonous to humans and livestock. The tuberous roots, stem base, and young shoots are especially toxic. Livestock poisoning from Water Hemlocks is the most common in dry areas of the western United States, where grazing animals are drawn to low areas for green forage during dry spells.

The poisonous properties of C. bulbifera are similar to those of other members of the genus Cicuta. The roots and rootstalks are the most poisonous parts of the plant, but apparently all parts of the plant may contain some of the poison, especially in the early stages of growth. Ingestion of a small portion of the root is enough to kill an adult. Some would list these plants as the most poisonous naturally occurring North American genus of leafy plants.

=== Poisoning ===
Poisoning from these plants has been reported a number of times in human beings. Children and adults have consumed the roots mistaking them for parsnips or other roots, often with fatal results. Most cases of poisoning however occur in early spring. The quantity of C. bulbifera necessary to cause death varies with the season and age of the plant. A piece of root about the size of a walnut is enough to cause the death of a cow.

=== Symptoms ===
The symptoms of poisoning by C. bulbifera in human beings include pain in the stomach, nausea, violent vomiting, diarrhea, dilated pupils, labored breathing, foaming at the mouth and rapid convulsions. In animals the first symptom is generally frothing at the mouth followed by uneasiness and pain, succeeded by violent intermittent convulsions in which the animal kicks while throwing its head back.

=== Treatment ===
Some suggested treatment is to give an efficient emetic, followed by a cathartic. If free vomiting is promptly produced, the patient is likely to recover. For cattle, injections of morphine have been recommended to treat convulsions and pain, but the convulsions are often uncontrollable.
