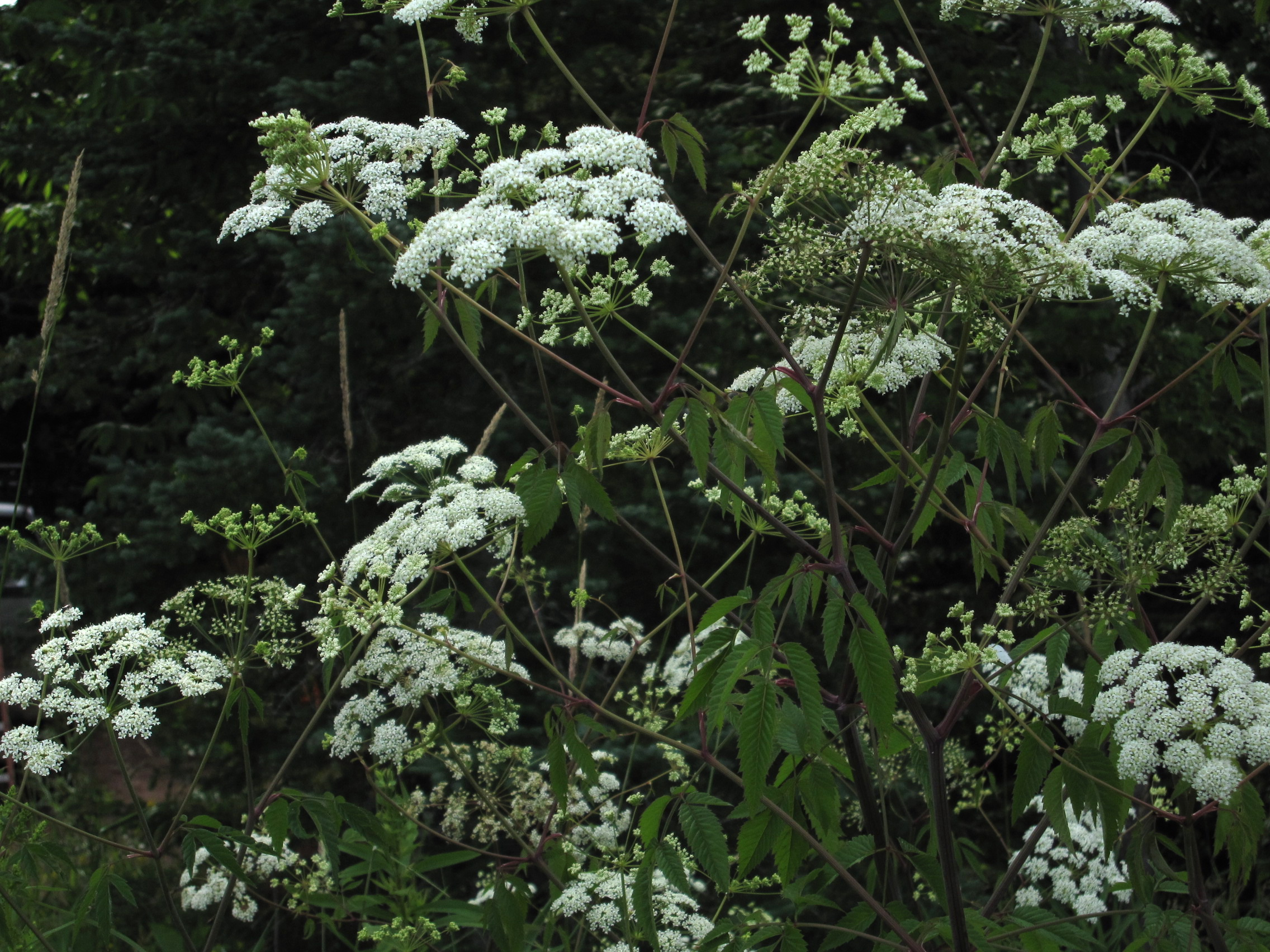

Conservation status
- Least Concern (IUCN 3.1)

- Secure (NatureServe)

Scientific classification
- Kingdom: Plantae
- Clade: Tracheophytes
- Clade: Angiosperms
- Clade: Eudicots
- Clade: Asterids
- Order: Apiales
- Family: Apiaceae
- Genus: Cicuta
- Species: C. maculata

Binomial name
- Cicuta maculata L.

Synonyms
- Cicuta bolanderi Cicuta curtissii Cicuta mexicana Cicuta occidentalis

= Cicuta maculata =

Species of plant

Cicuta maculata is a highly poisonous species of flowering plant in the carrot family known by several common names, including spotted water hemlock, spotted parsley, and spotted cowbane. It is native to nearly all of North America, from northern Canada to southern Mexico.

== Description ==
Cicuta maculata is a rhizomatous perennial herb producing a hollow erect stem that can reach a height of 1.8 meters (6 feet). The long leaves are made up of several lance-shaped, pointed, serrated leaflets. Each shiny green leaflet is 2 to 10 centimeters (1 to 4 inches) long and the entire leaf may be up to 40 cm (16 in) long. The inflorescence of white flowers is similar in appearance to other species in the carrot family. It is a compound umbel with many clusters of flowers. The dry tan-brown fruit is a few millimeters long.

The plant prefers wet habitats, such as wet meadows, roadside ditches, pond margins, open marshes, and freshwater swamps. Flowering is from May to September.

The poisonous plant is occasionally mistaken for parsnips, due to its clusters of white tuberous roots.

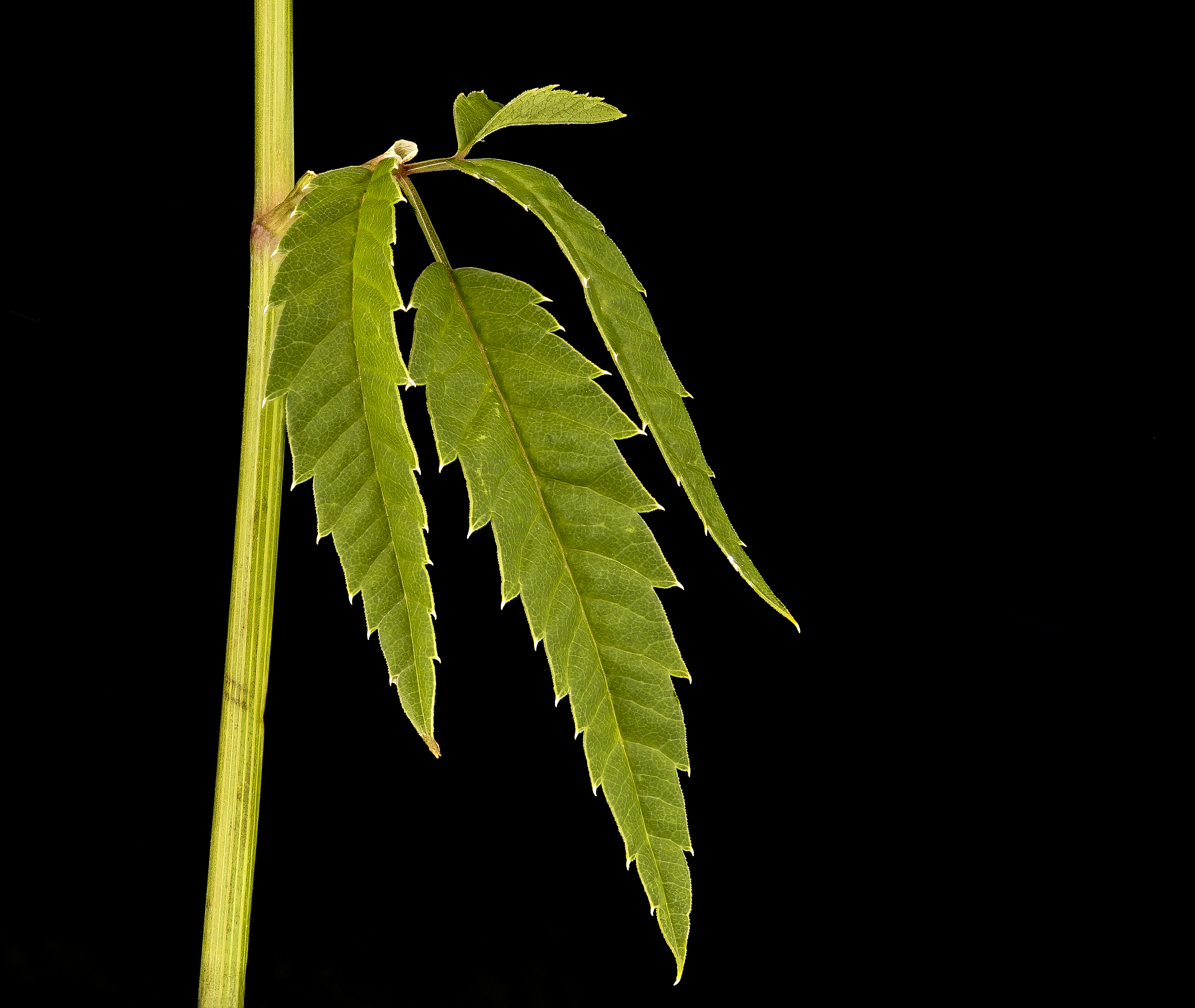
Leaves

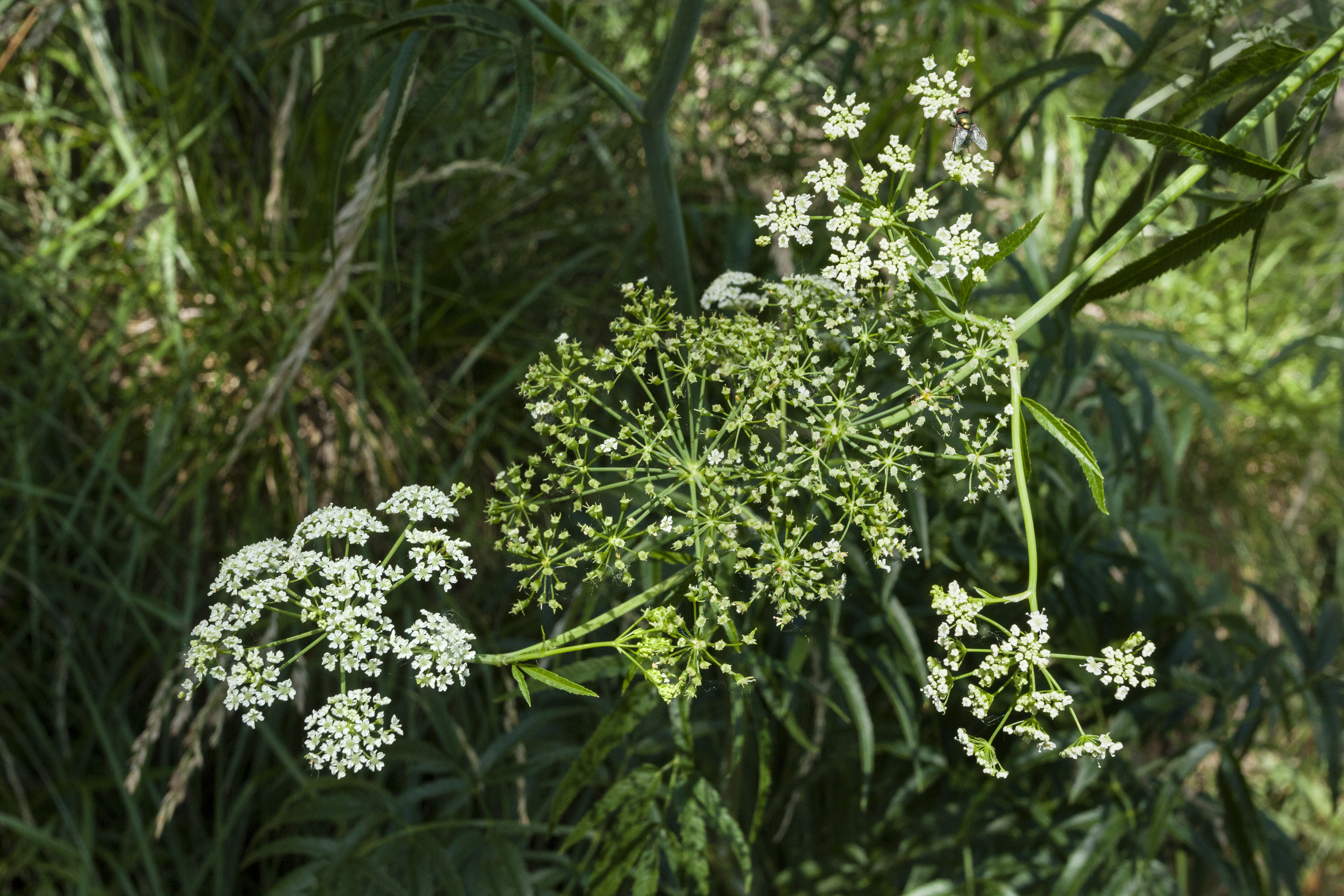
Flower umbels

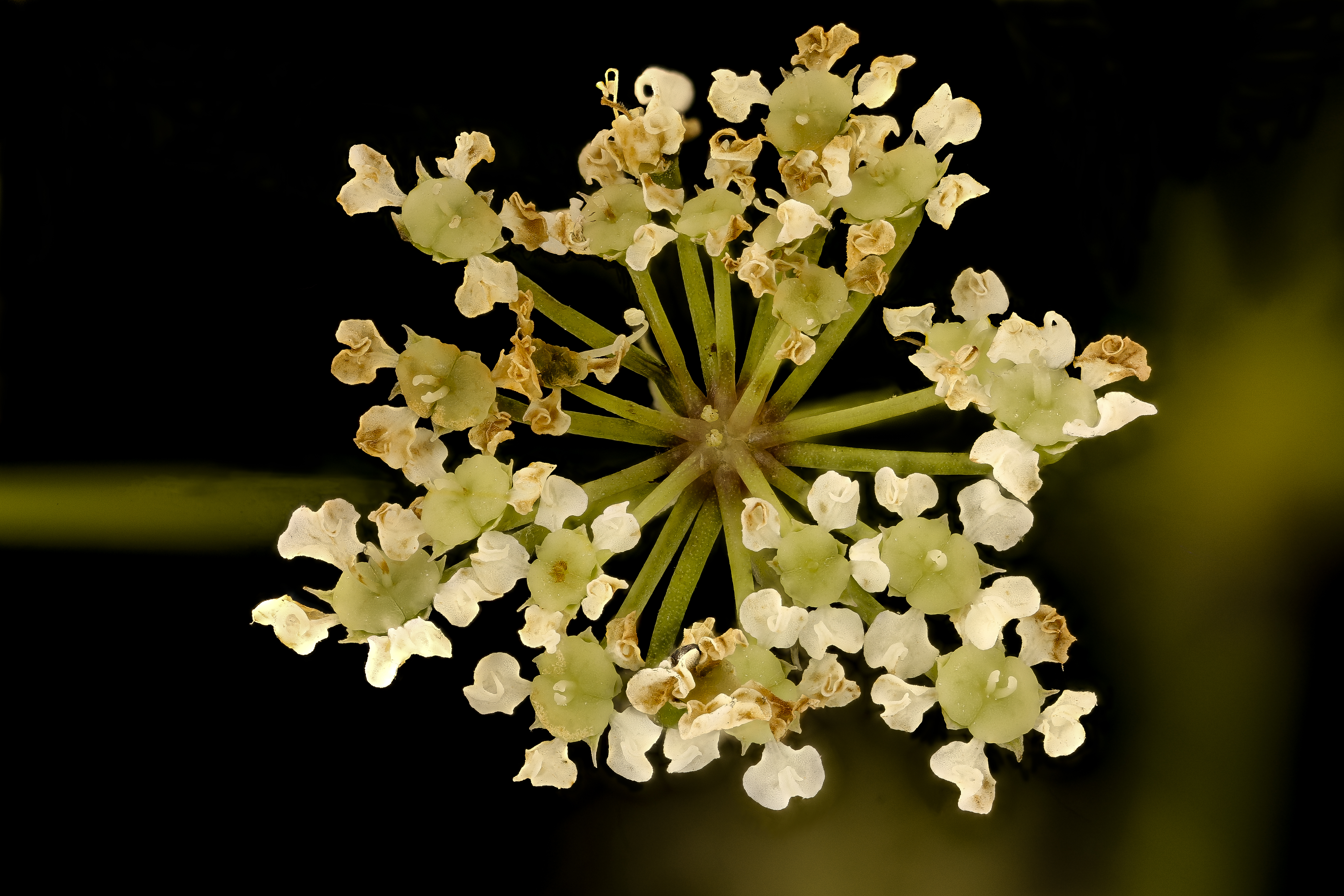
Close-up of flowers

== Toxicity ==
The confusion with parsnips can be fatal as C. maculata is extremely poisonous. It is considered to be North America's most toxic native plant.

Cicuta is fatal when swallowed, causing violent and painful convulsions. Though a number of people have died from water hemlock poisoning over the centuries, livestock have long been the worst affected (hence the name "cowbane"), with ingestion of the plant causing death in as little as 15 minutes.

The chief poison is cicutoxin, an unsaturated aliphatic alcohol that is most concentrated in the roots. Upon human consumption, nausea, vomiting, and tremors occur within 30–60 minutes, followed by severe cramps, projectile vomiting, and convulsions. Occasional long-term effects include retrograde amnesia. Ingestion of water hemlock in any quantity can result in death or permanent damage to the central nervous system.

== Conservation ==
While the species as a whole is not under threat of extinction according to the International Union for Conservation of Nature and NatureServe, the variety C. maculata var. victorinii (Victorin's water-hemlock) is a listed Species of Concern under Schedule 1 of the Canadian Species at Risk Act. According to a 2022 Committee on the Status of Endangered Wildlife in Canada (COSEWIC) report, Victorin's water-hemlock, the sole variety of C. maculata that grows in parts of tidal marshes with brackish exposure and regular tidal inundation, will soon qualify for threatened status if threats are not addressed. Victorin's water-hemlock is endemic to the St. Lawrence River estuary, which is in Canada.

== Common names ==
Cicuta maculata possesses an extensive number of commons names.

English

- Beaver poison
- Cicutaire (Canadian name)
- Musquash root
- Spotted hemlock
- Spotted water hemlock
- Spotted cowbane

Seneca

- o'nö́hsë:ë'

== See also ==
- Conium maculatum
