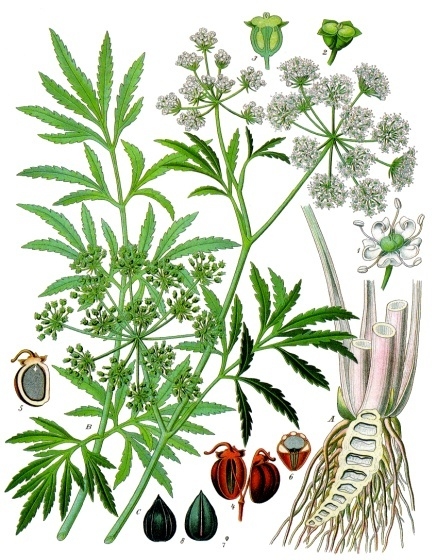

Conservation status
- Least Concern (IUCN 3.1)

Scientific classification
- Kingdom: Plantae
- Clade: Tracheophytes
- Clade: Angiosperms
- Clade: Eudicots
- Clade: Asterids
- Order: Apiales
- Family: Apiaceae
- Genus: Cicuta
- Species: C. virosa

Binomial name
- Cicuta virosa L.

= Cicuta virosa =

Species of plant

Cicuta virosa, the cowbane or northern water hemlock, is a poisonous species of Cicuta, native to northern and central Europe, northern Asia and northwestern North America.

== Description ==
It is a perennial herbaceous plant which grows up to 1–2 m tall. The stems are smooth, branching, swollen at the base, purple-striped, and hollow except for partitions at the junction of the leaves and stem. In cross section the stems have one flat side and the other sides are rounded. The leaves are alternate, tripinnate, only coarsely toothed, unlike the ferny, lacy leaves found in many other members of the family Apiaceae. The flowers are small, white and clustered in umbrella shaped inflorescences typical of the family. The many flowered umbellets have unequal pedicels that range from 5 to 11 cm long during fruiting. An oily, yellow liquid oozes from cuts to the stems and roots. This liquid has a rank smell resembling that of parsnips or carrots. The plant may be mistaken for parsnip due to its clusters of white tuberous roots.

It grows in wet meadows, along streambanks and other wet and marshy areas.

== History ==
Scholars dispute whether a hemlock of the genus Cicuta or the genus Conium served in ancient Greece as a state poison, administered as a method of capital punishment. The Greek philosopher Socrates drank a cup of some kind of hemlock infusion at his execution in 399 BC. Cicuta virosa is however primarily a northern European species, rare or absent from the Mediterranean region, making its use in Greece unlikely. See Poison hemlock for more information.

The dose of hemlock used for Greek executions was not always immediately fatal, and sometimes it proved necessary to administer a second cup of the poison.

...having drunk all the Hemlock juice, the quantity was found insufficient and the executioner refused to prepare more unless he was paid 12 drachmas.
—from an account of the execution of Phocion in 318 BC

Considering the extreme toxicity of Cicuta virosa, this passage provides further evidence that it was not the species of hemlock used.

In the past, this plant has had a number of colorful names, including Mackenzie's water hemlock, Beaver-poison, Children's-bane, Snakeweed and Musquash-poison.

== Toxicity ==
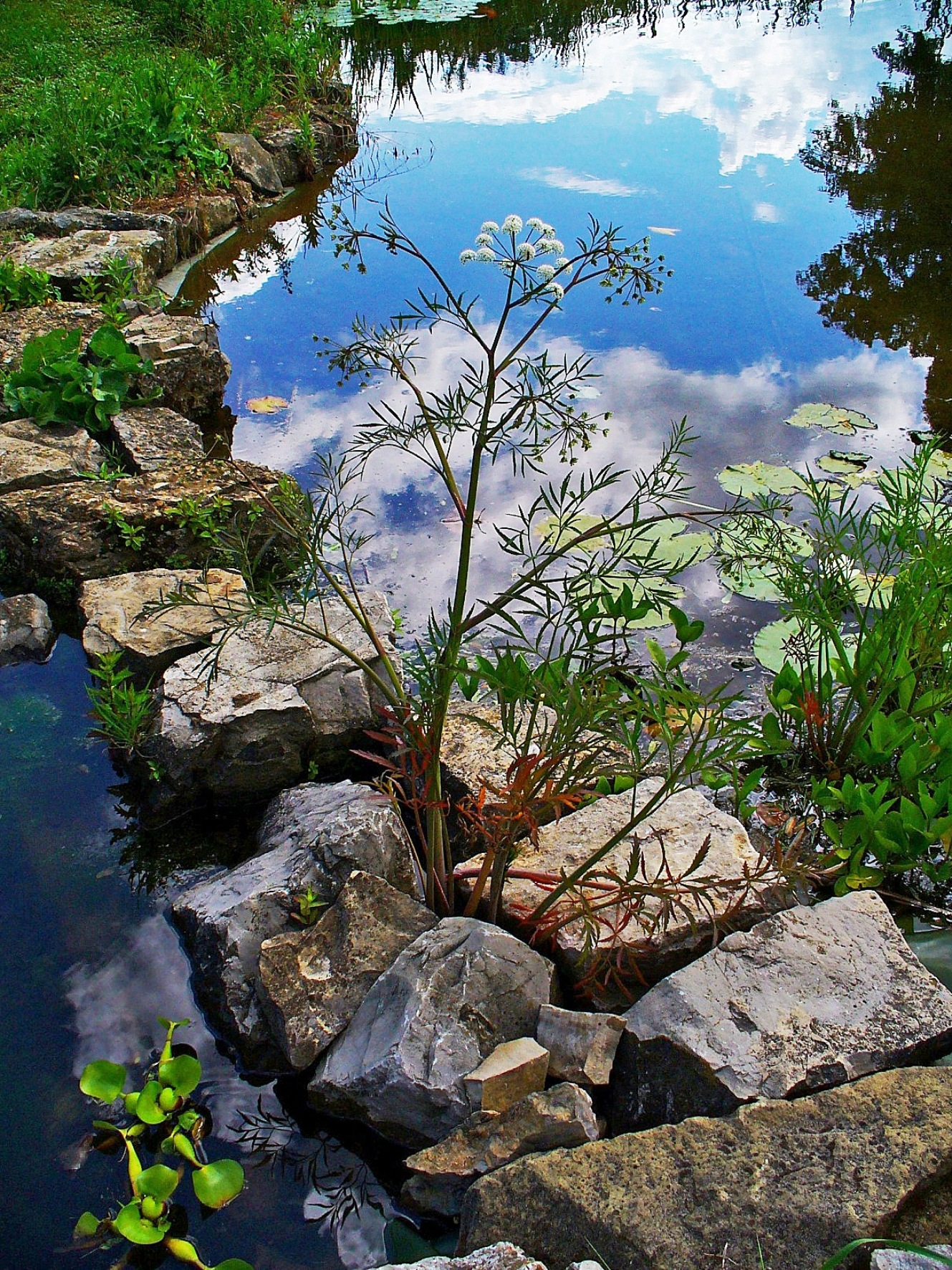
Cicuta virosa.

The plant contains cicutoxin, which disrupts the workings of the central nervous system. In humans, cicutoxin rapidly produces symptoms of nausea, emesis and abdominal pain, typically within 60 minutes of ingestion. Poisoning can lead to tremors and seizures. A single bite of the root (which has the highest concentration of cicutoxin) can be sufficient to cause death. In animals the toxic dose and the lethal dose are nearly the same. One gram of water hemlock per kilogram of weight will kill a sheep and 230 grams is sufficient to kill a horse. Due to the rapid onset of symptoms, treatment is usually unsuccessful.

== Fossil record ==
Cicuta virosa fossil fruit halves are described rare in the Pliocene of Europe but common in the Pleistocene interglacial floras of the East European Plain.
