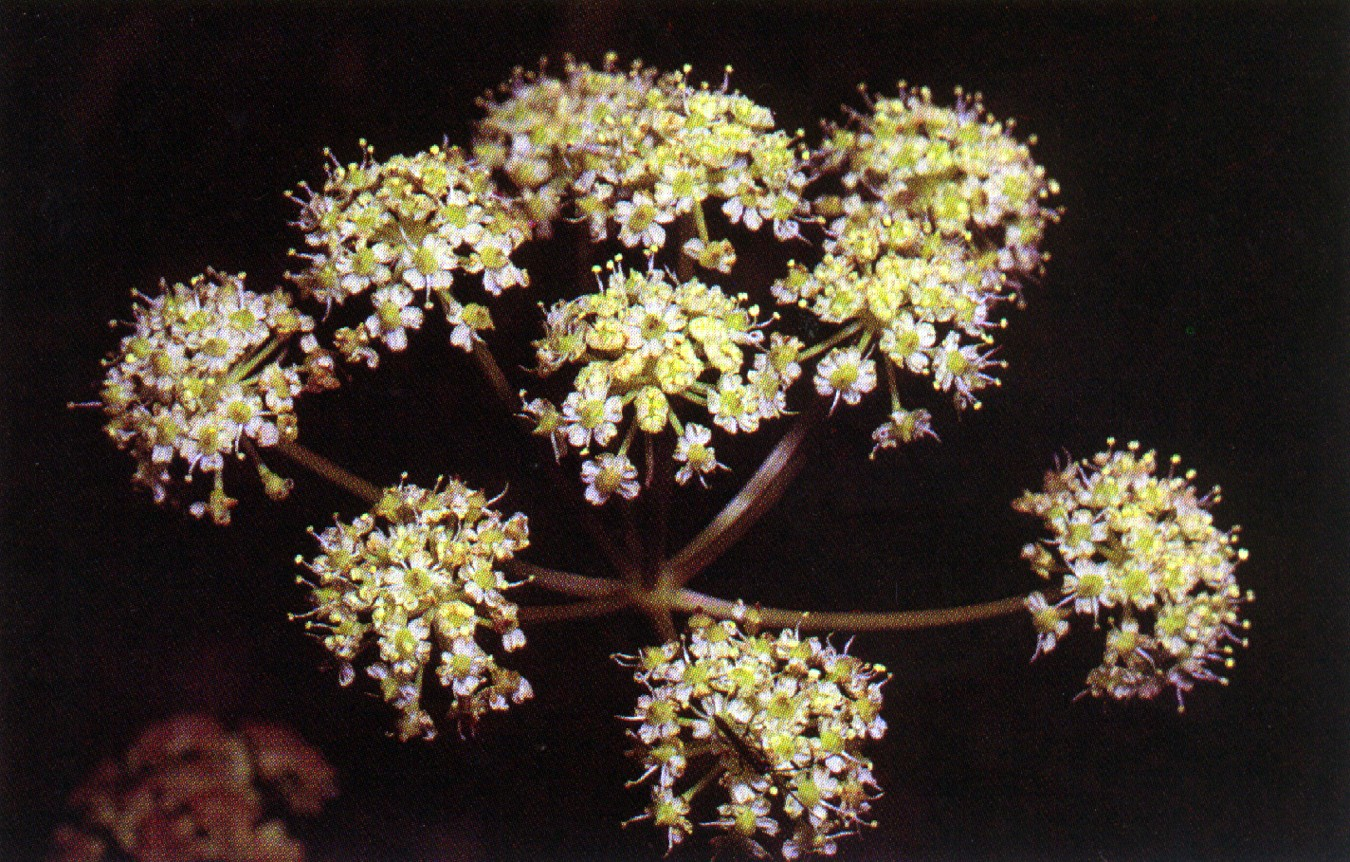

Conservation status
- Least Concern (IUCN 3.1)

- Secure (NatureServe)

Scientific classification
- Kingdom: Plantae
- Clade: Tracheophytes
- Clade: Angiosperms
- Clade: Eudicots
- Clade: Asterids
- Order: Apiales
- Family: Apiaceae
- Genus: Cicuta
- Species: C. douglasii

Binomial name
- Cicuta douglasii (DC.) Coult. & Rose

= Cicuta douglasii =

Species of flowering plant

Cicuta douglasii, the western water hemlock, is a very poisonous perennial plant in the family Apiaceae.

== Description ==
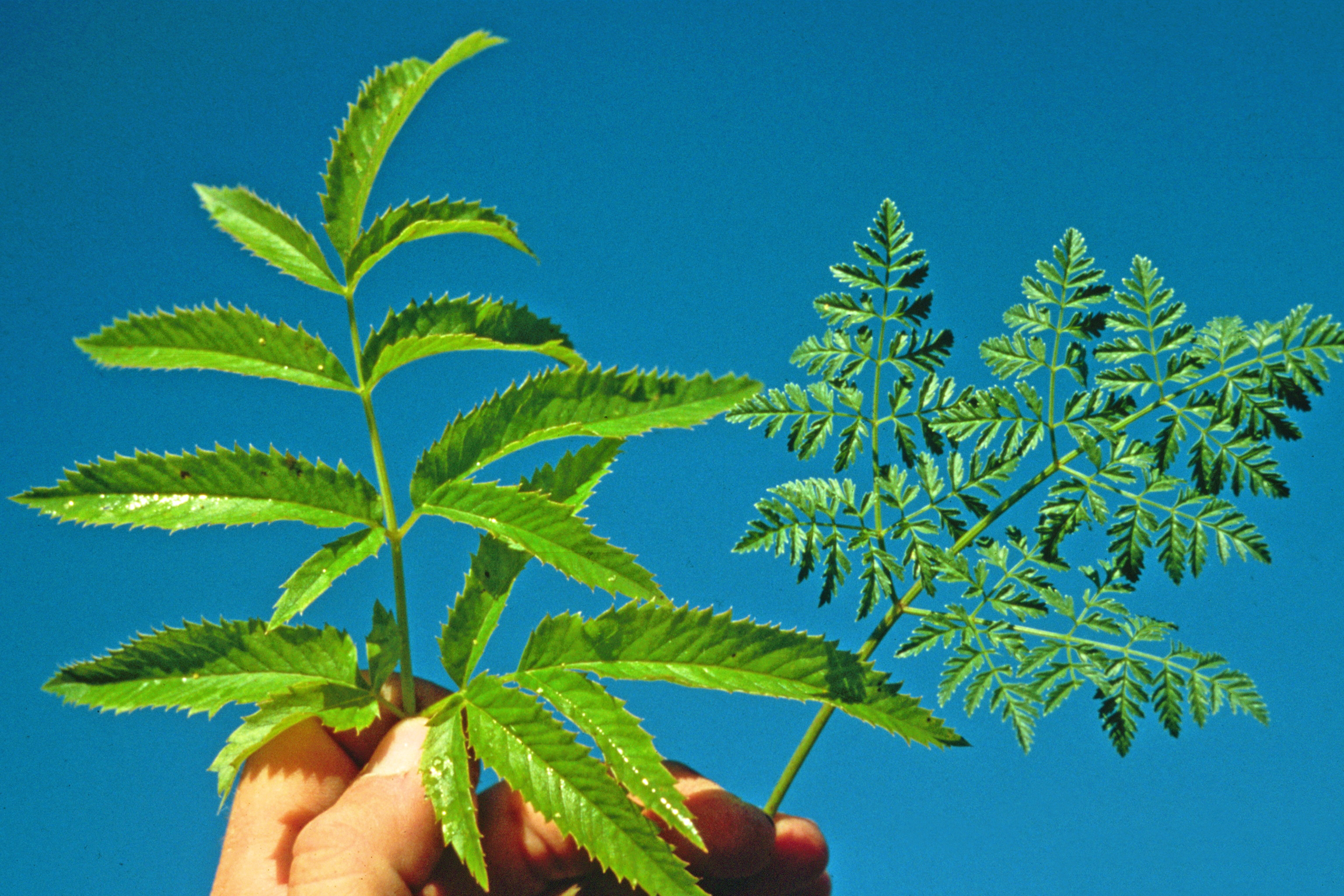
The leaves of Cicuta douglasii (left), along with those of Conium maculatum (poison hemlock); both species are extremely poisonous.

The plant's roots are thick and tuberous, with many smaller tubers on the main one, allowing survival in wet conditions. The stem is 0.5–2 meters (1 1/2–6 1/2 ft) tall with purplish spots. The inner tubers and stem bases can have horizontal chambers useful for identification. The leaves are alternate and compound pinnate; the secondary veins of the leaflets end at the bases instead of the tips of the teeth. The leaflets are 3–10 centimeters (1 1/4–4 in) long and 1–2 cm (1/2–3/4 in) wide, with jagged edges. Its inflorescences are compound umbels about 12.5 cm (5 in) across, with many small, white flowers, which have two seeds each. The seeds germinate in spring, and flowers mature near the end of June and beginning of July. Seed dispersal is by means of wind, water, machinery, clothing, and through transported soil. In addition to sprouting new plants from seeds, rootstocks can also produce new plants in the fall from the basal meristem. When these detach the following spring, they may form a new plant.

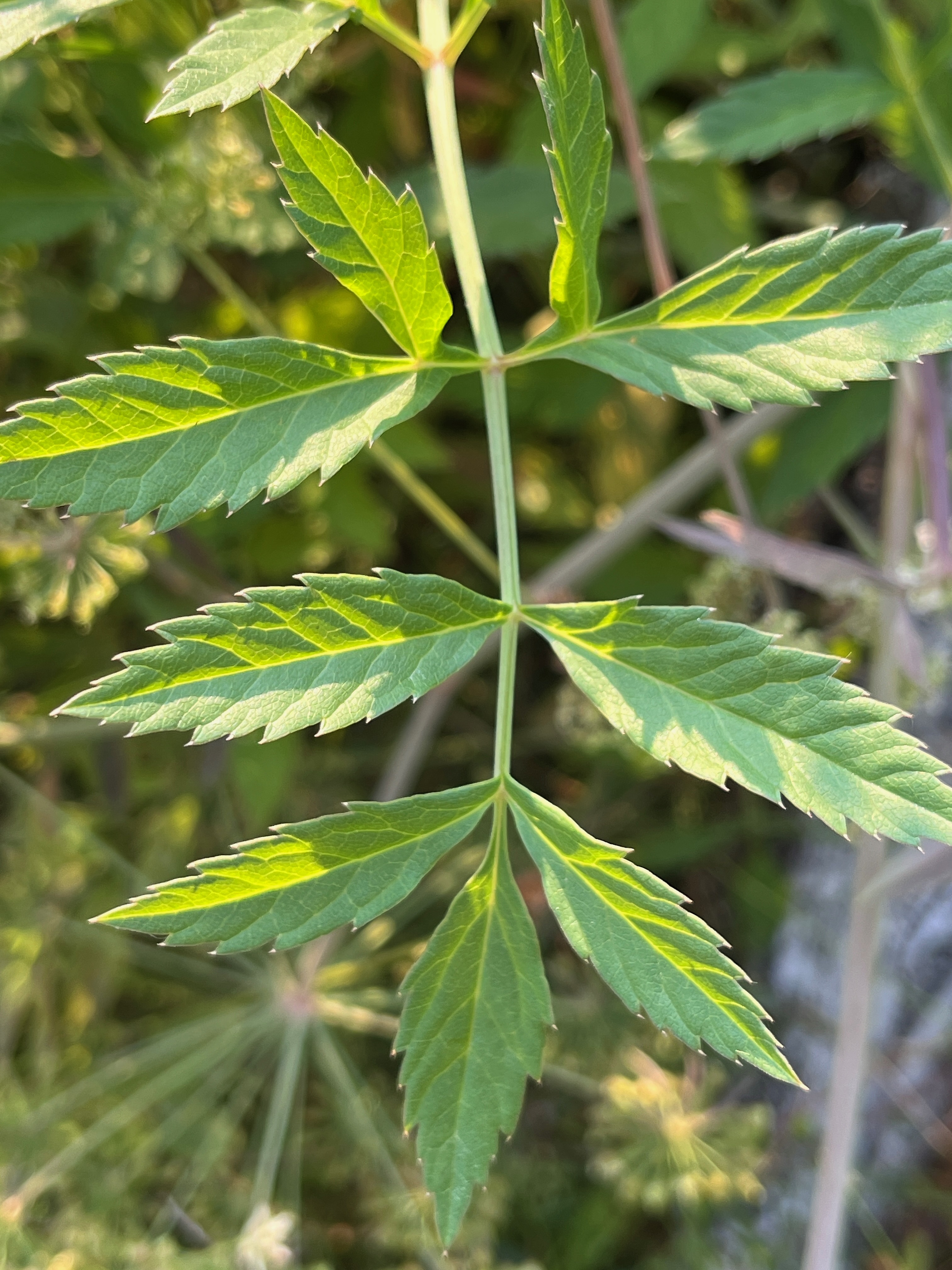
Leaf detail, showing distinctive venation (see text).

== Distribution and habitat ==
Water hemlock is most abundant in British Columbia, and is indigenous to North America, where it grows primarily from the base of the Rocky Mountains to the Pacific coast, stretching from Alaska all the way to California. Water requirements limit this plant from inhabiting open rangelands. It grows in wet places such as marshes, stream banks, slough margins, ditches, meadows, and wet pastures.

== Toxicity ==
The main distinguishing characteristic of western water hemlock is its toxicity. Cicutoxin is the toxin that is produced, making water hemlock the most poisonous plant in North America. Cicutoxin is a yellowish liquid that is prevalent in the roots. This unsaturated alcohol has a major impact on the central nervous system of animals. Early symptoms of cicutoxin poisoning include excessive salivation, frothing at the mouth, nervousness, and incoordination. These symptoms can progress to tremors, muscular weakness, seizures and respiratory failure. Ingestion of green materials of western water hemlock in amounts equivalent to about 0.1% of a person's body weight can even lead to death. In addition to being extremely hazardous to humans, this plant has an enormous impact on animals. As little as 0.2–0.5% body weight for sheep, 0.1% body weight for cattle, 0.5% body weight for horses, and 0.3% body weight for swine can be lethal. Death can occur within fifteen minutes of ingesting the toxin. It is one of the first plants to emerge in springtime, and has a very appealing odor. These characteristics, along with the fact that it grows in moist areas, make the plant very attractive, but deadly, to grazing animals.
