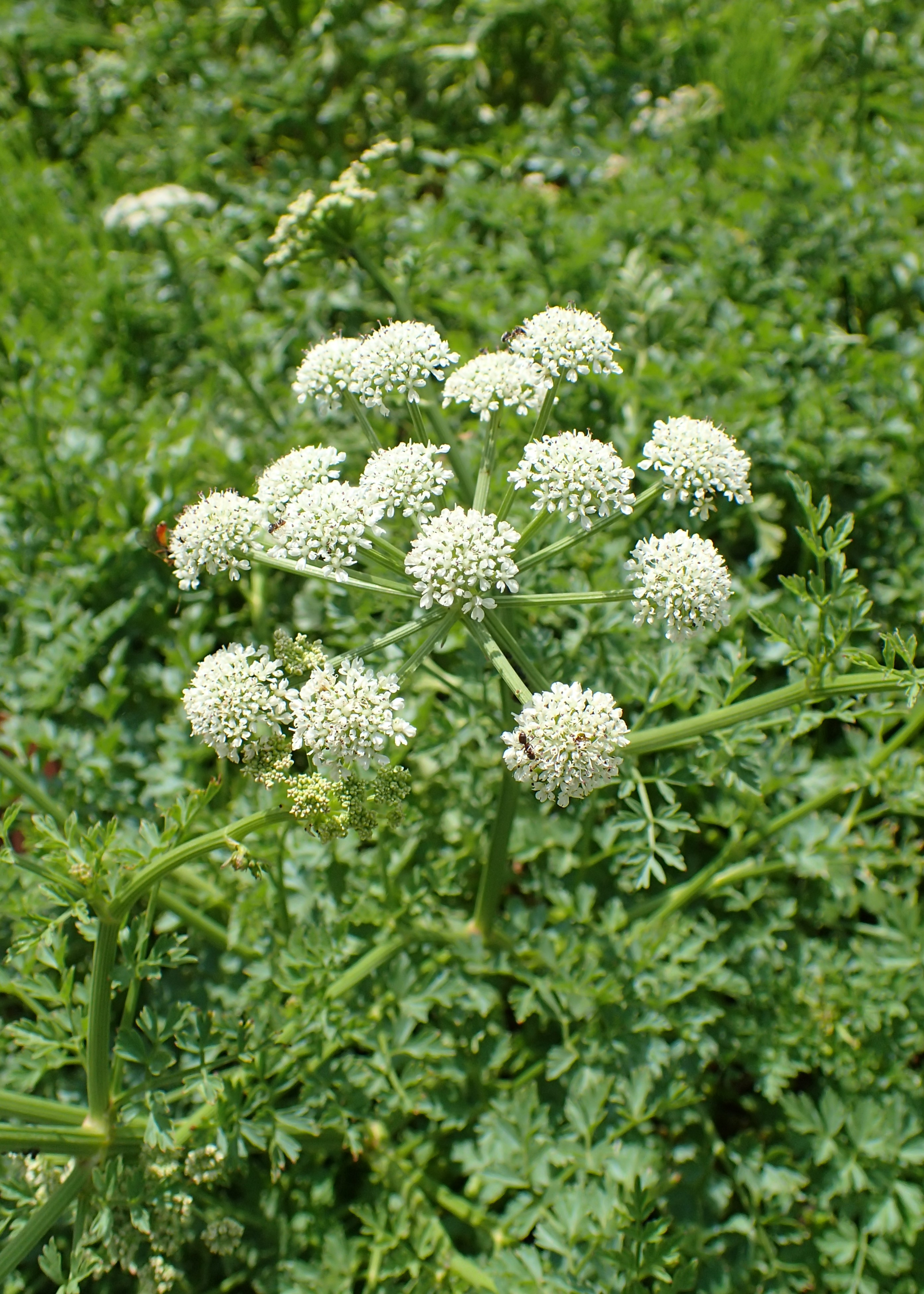

Scientific classification
- Kingdom: Plantae
- Clade: Embryophytes
- Clade: Tracheophytes
- Clade: Spermatophytes
- Clade: Angiosperms
- Clade: Eudicots
- Clade: Asterids
- Order: Apiales
- Family: Apiaceae
- Genus: Oenanthe
- Species: O. crocata

Binomial name
- Oenanthe crocata L.

Synonyms
- List: Oenanthe apiifolia Brot.; Oenanthe crocata f. macrosciadia (Willk.) Lange; Oenanthe crocata subsp. apiifolia (Brot.) Arcang.; Oenanthe crocata var. broteri Merino; Oenanthe crocata var. crocata L.; Oenanthe crocata var. longissima Reduron; Oenanthe crocata var. macrosciada (Willk.) Lange; Oenanthe crocata var. oligactis Lange; Oenanthe crocata var. tenuisecta Merino; Oenanthe gallaecica Pau & Merino; Oenanthe macrosciadia Willk.; Oenanthe oligactis Pau; Oenanthe prolifera L.; Phellandrium plinii Bubani

= Oenanthe crocata =

Species of flowering plant

Oenanthe crocata, hemlock water-dropwort (sometimes known as dead man's fingers) is a flowering plant in the carrot family, native to Europe, North Africa and western Asia. It grows in damp grassland and wet woodland, often along river and stream banks. All parts of the plant are extremely toxic and it has been known to cause human and livestock poisoning.

== Description ==
Hemlock water-dropwort is a robust hairless perennial growing up to 150 cm tall with hollow, cylindrical, grooved stems up to 3.5 centimetres (1.4 in) across. The stems are often branched. The upper part of the roots include five or more obovoid, pale yellow, fleshy tubers up to 6 centimetres (2.4 in) long, which exude a yellowish oily fluid when cut that stains the skin.

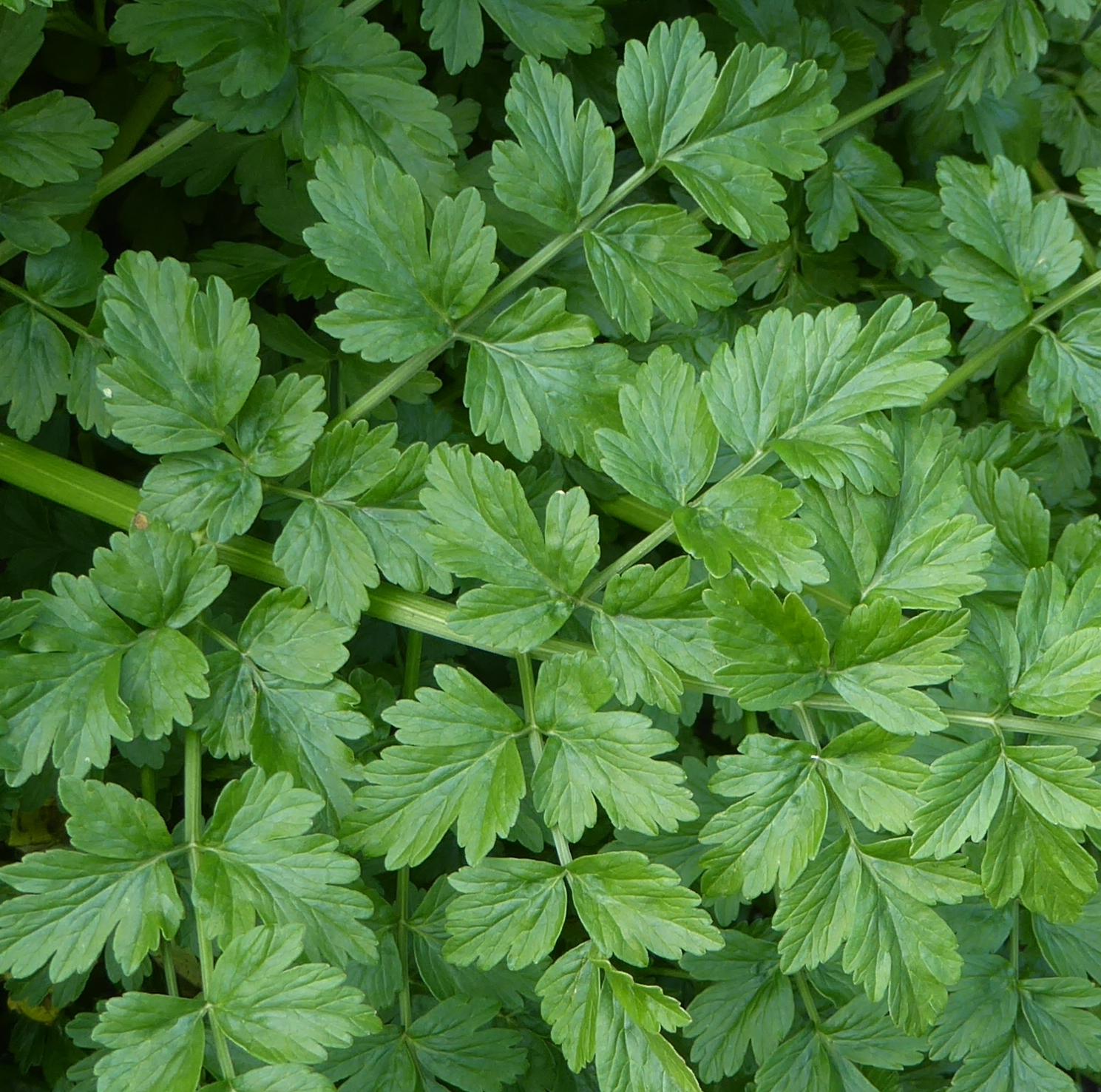
Foliage of hemlock water-dropwort

The lower leaves are 3–4 times pinnate, triangular, with oval toothed leaflets 10–20 millimetres (0.39–0.79 in) long, that are basally tapered to the stalk (cuneate). The upper leaves are 1–2 pinnate, with narrower lobes and a shorter petiole (leaf stalk). All the leaves are spirally arranged and have petioles that are slightly sheathing around the stem. The leaves have a characteristically deceptive odour of parsley or celery.

Like other species in the genus, hemlock water-dropwort has compound umbels, with 12–40 smooth rays (stalks), 3–8 centimetres (1.2–3.1 in) aclong, which carry the smaller umbellules. These rays are shorter than the stalk (peduncle) below, and they do not become thicker after flowering. At the base of the rays are about five bracts, which are linear to trifid in shape. These umbels are either terminal (at the top of the stem) or lateral (in the leaf axils).

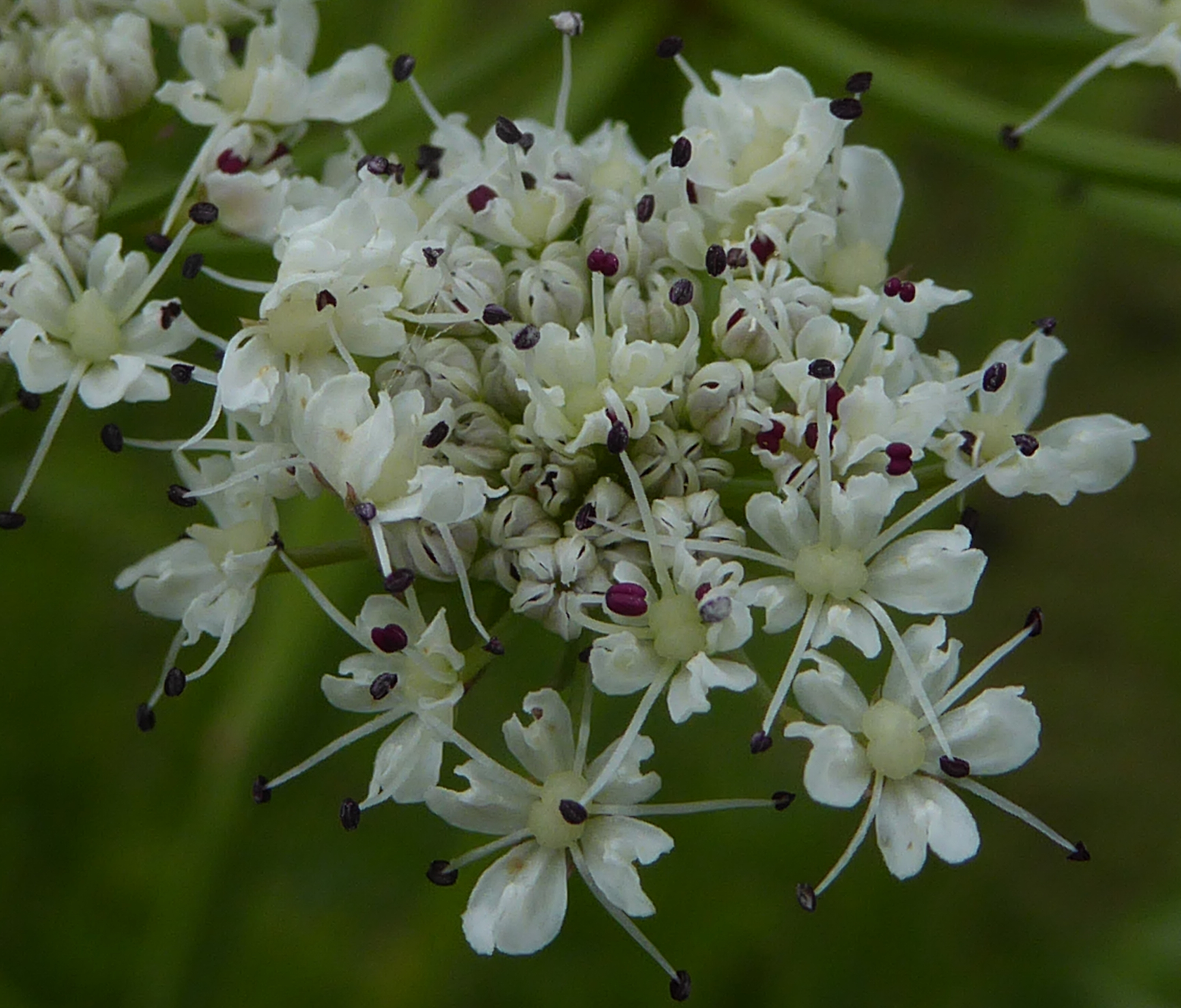
Close-up of the flowers

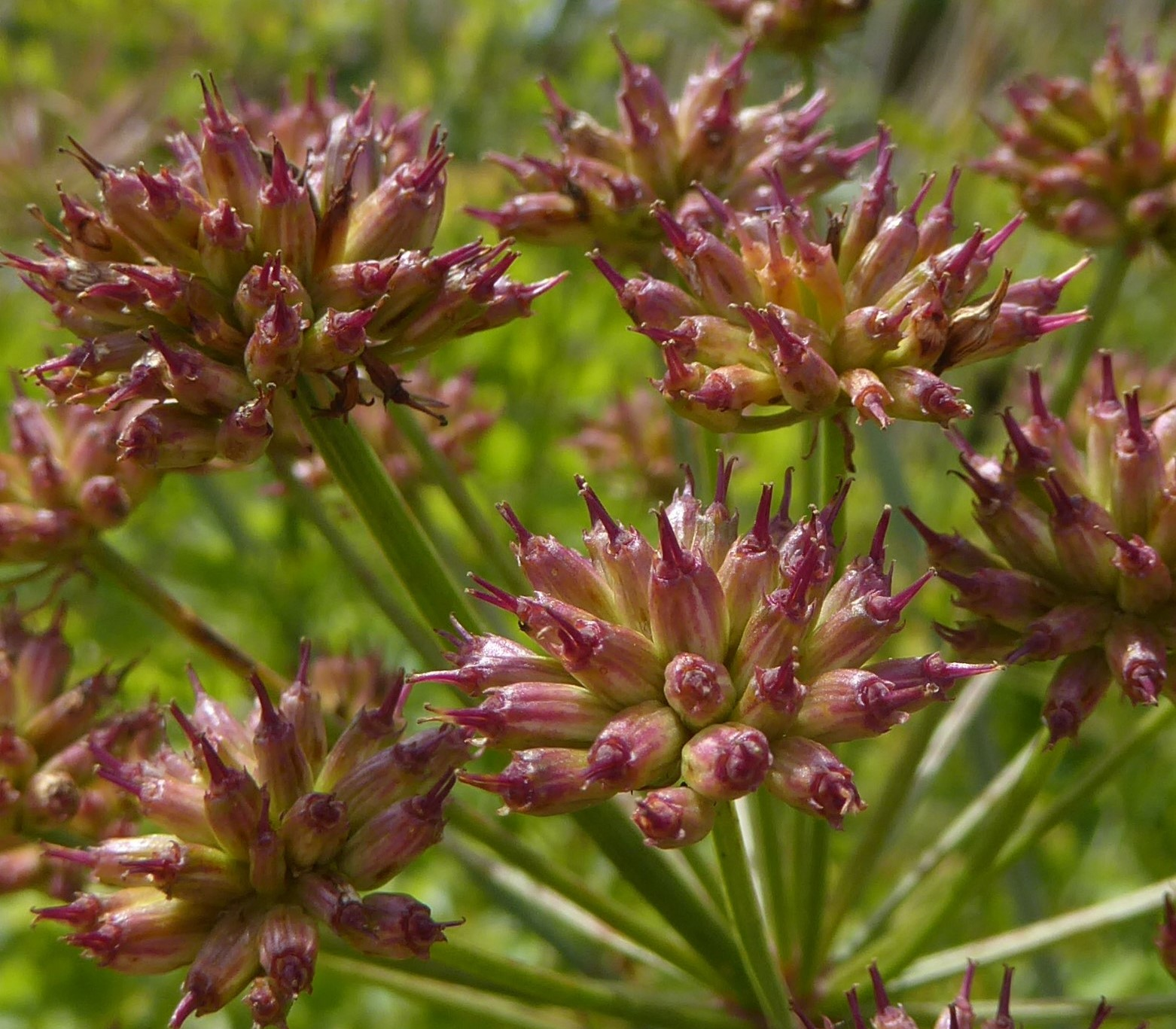
Fruits of hemlock water-dropwort

The umbellules, which are 5–10 centimetres (2.0–3.9 in) in diameter, have 6 or more bracteoles at their base and numerous flowers on short pedicels. The flowers are white, almost actinomorphic with five subequal petals, the outer ones being slightly larger. There are also five conspicuous sepals which are triangular, sharply pointed, and persistent. The terminal umbels have mostly bisexual flowers; the lateral ones have mostly male flowers. The flowers have five stamens and (if present) two styles, with an enlarged base forming a structure called a stylopodium. The cylindrical fruits are 4–6 millimetres (0.16–0.24 in) ac long, with styles measuring 2 millimetres (0.079 in) in length.

This species usually flowers in June and July in northern Europe.

== Identification ==
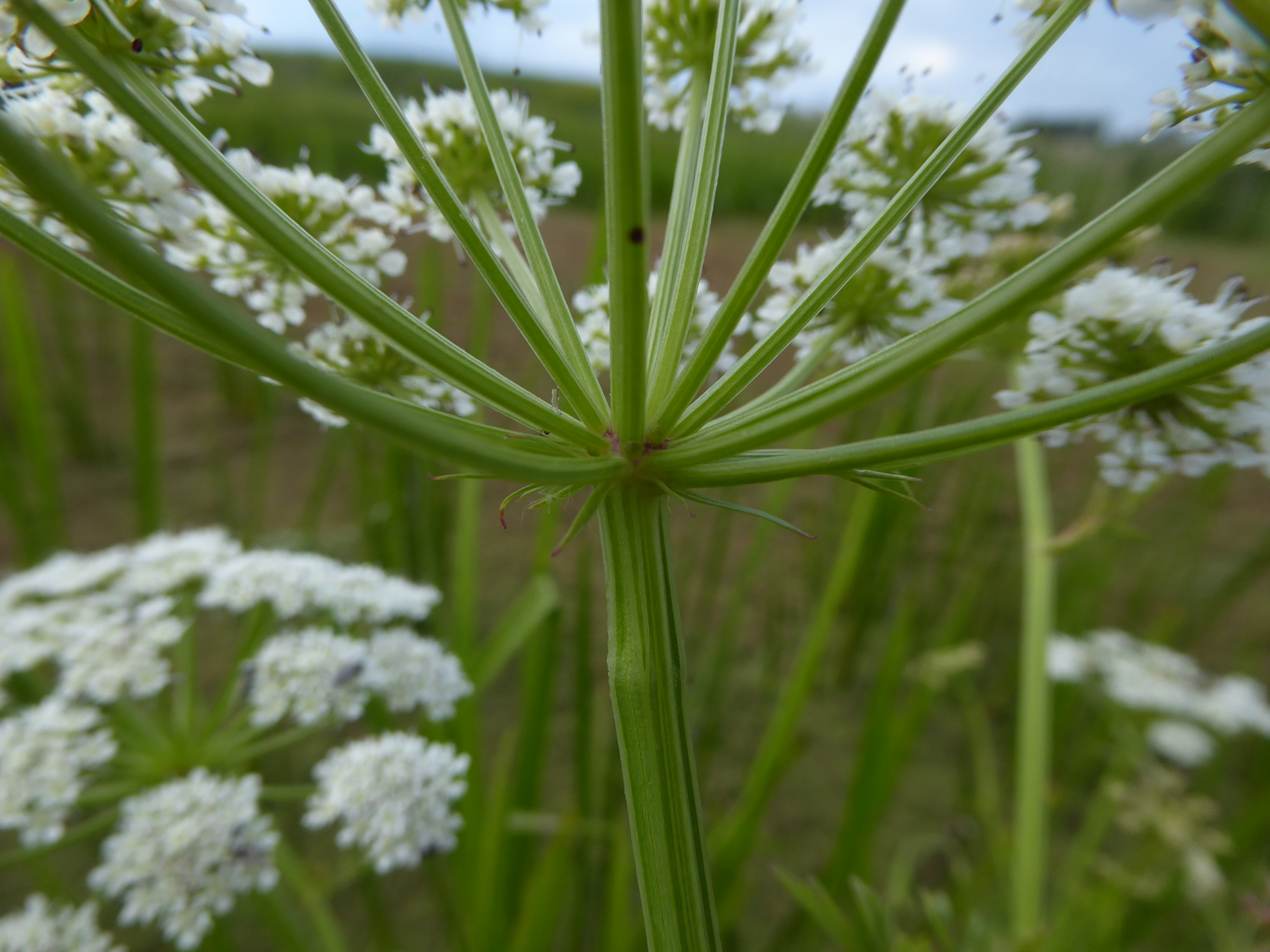
Rays and bracts of a primary umbel

Hemlock water-dropwort is easily separated from the other water-dropworts in Britain by its greater size, its broad, flat leaflets, and the long, thin bracts on the primary umbels. It is more likely to be confused with species in other genera, including perhaps cowbane or greater water-parsnip. The former has no bracts and latter has upper leaves which are just once pinnate, while hemlock water-dropwort always has at least ternate leaflets (divided into three parts).

== Taxonomy and nomenclature ==
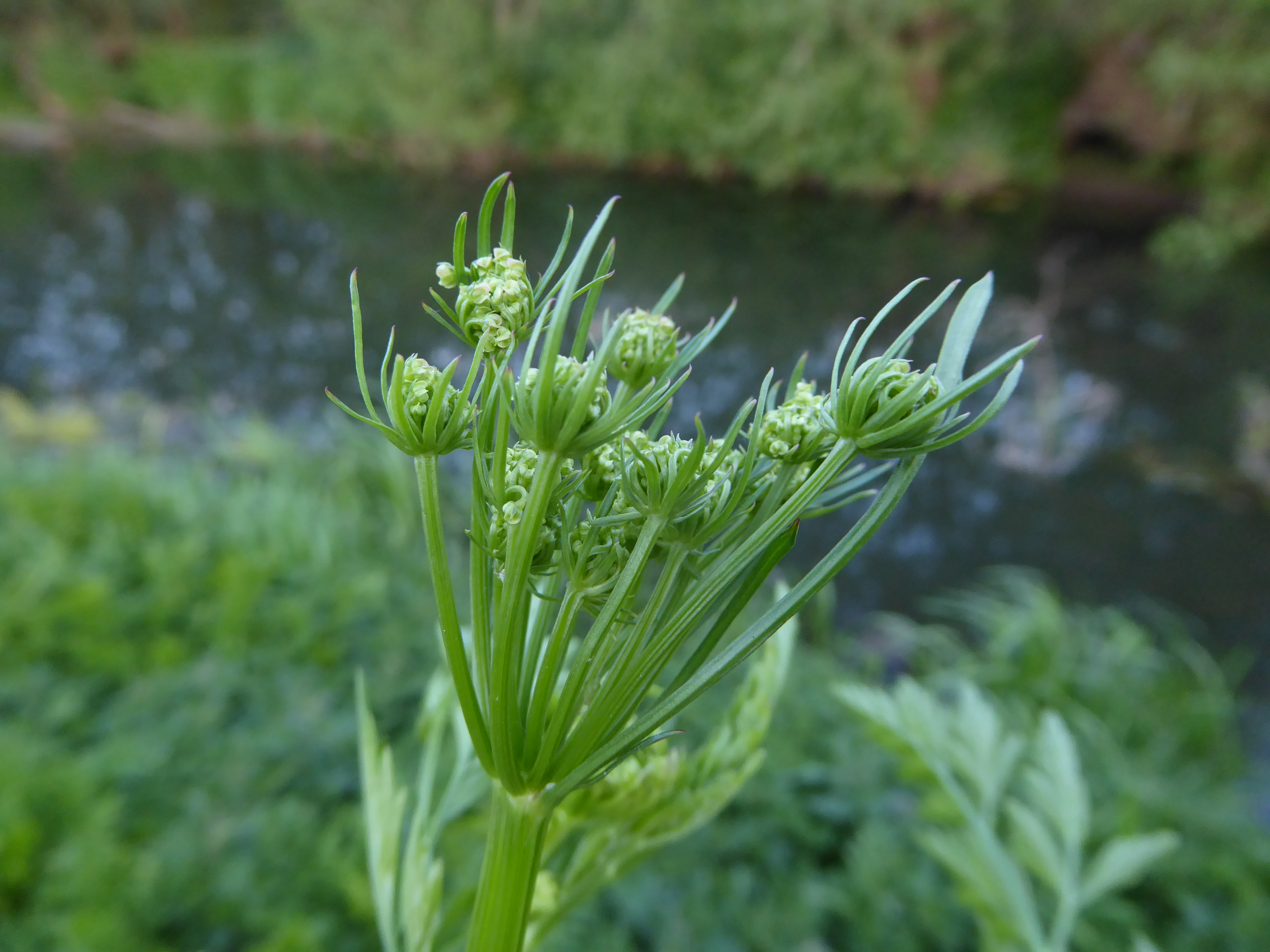
Atypically large and numerous bracteoles on an immature umbel

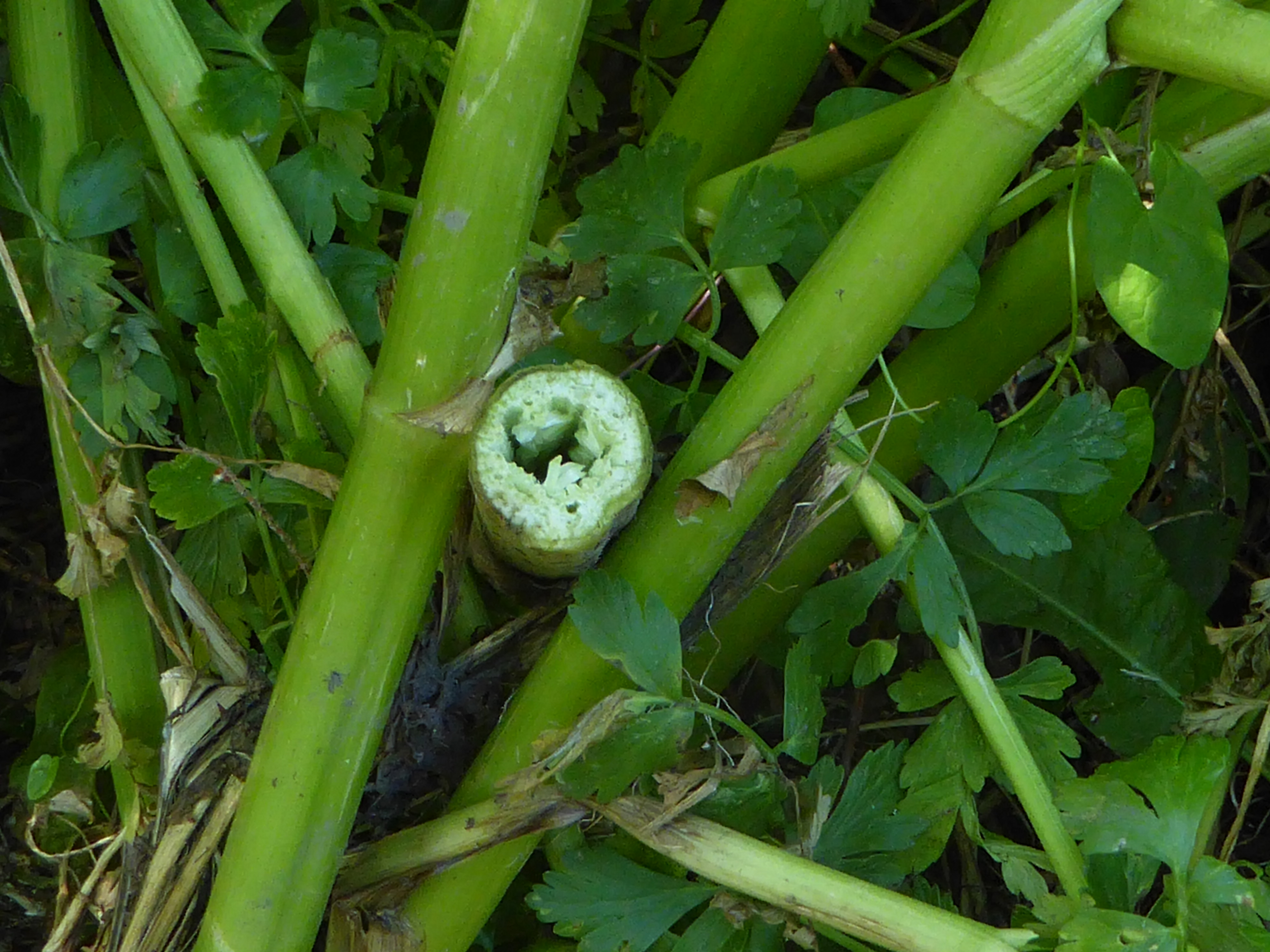
Section of a cut stem, which had a diameter of 3.2 cm

Although hemlock water-dropwort has been recognised as a distinct plant for centuries, the modern definition was worked out by Artedius in the early 18th century, and the name was published by Linnaeus in 1753 in Species Plantarum.

It has several synonyms (i.e. other authors have named the same plant, but the Linnaean name for it stands), including O. apiifolia Brot. (1804), Phellandrium plinii Bubani (1899), Oenanthe macrosciadia Willk. (1852) and O. gallaecica Pau & Merino (1904). A full list can be found in the Synonymic Checklists of the Plants of the World.

It has no subspecies, but numerous varieties have been named, none of which is in common use today.

There are no recorded hybrids.

Its chromosome number is 2n = 22 (based on British specimens).

The generic name Oenanthe, which comes from the Ancient Greek οίνος, "wine" and άνθος, "flower", was used in ancient times for certain Mediterranean plants and later adopted to describe this genus. The specific epithet "crocata" comes from the same root as crocus, and refers to the saffron-yellow colour of the oil that exudes from ducts in the tubers, although this is difficult to observe in fresh specimens. The common name "dropwort" refers to the drop-shaped tubers found amongst the roots of certain species in this genus. The "hemlock" part is possibly because of the plant's superficial resemblance to Conium maculatum.

In older botanical works, the planet symbol for Jupiter (♃) sometimes appears by the name. This is simply a code to show that the plant is a perennial.

== Distribution and status ==
The native distribution of hemlock water-dropwort is concentrated along the Atlantic seaboard of Europe, from the coast of the Netherlands south to Portugal and Spain, rapidly becoming rare inland. It is common again in Corsica and Sardinia but otherwise only sparsely distributed around the Mediterranean east to Syria and southwards to Morocco. It is perhaps most common in Britain and Ireland, where it is widespread throughout, even in inland locations.

There are few records of it as an introduction outside its native range, although it has been reported from Argentina.

In France, where it is known as oenanthe jaune safran, it is considered unthreatened ("Least Concern", or LC), although in some départements it is rarer; for example, in Île-de-France and Picardy it is classified as Critically Endangered (CR). In Britain, it is similarly listed as LC.

== Habitat and ecology ==
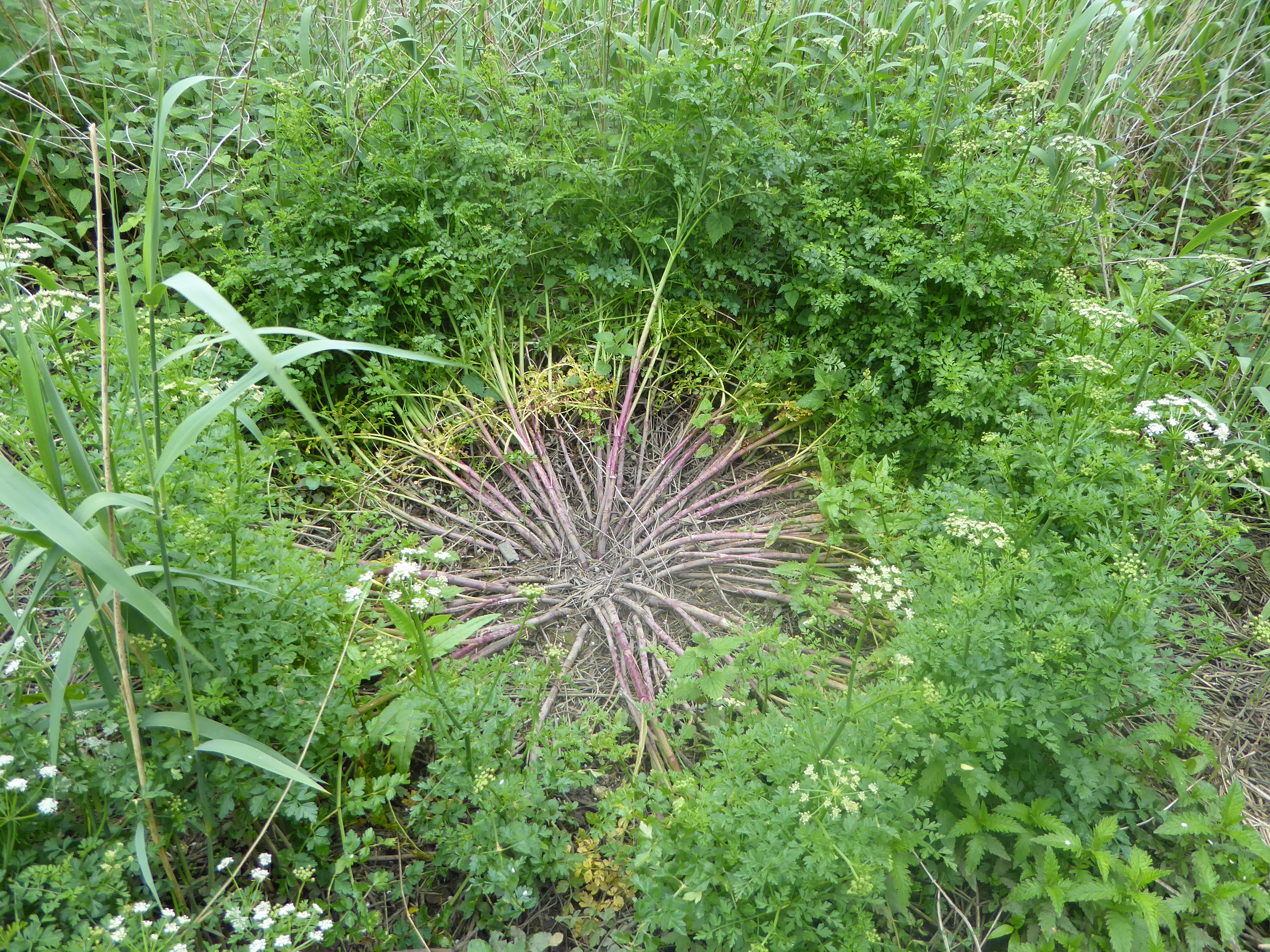
A sprawling plant of hemlock water-dropwort in crack willow carr by the river Stour in Kent

Hemlock water-dropwort is a plant of shallow fresh water streams, marshes, lakes, ponds, canals and wet woodland. It is usually a calcifuge, and as a lowland species it nearly always occurs below 300 m, although in Britain it is found as high as 340 m in the Brecon Beacons. In Wales, where it is known as cegiden y dŵr, it is reported to be salt-tolerant, and is known on the inland edges of salt marshes and even on harbour walls.

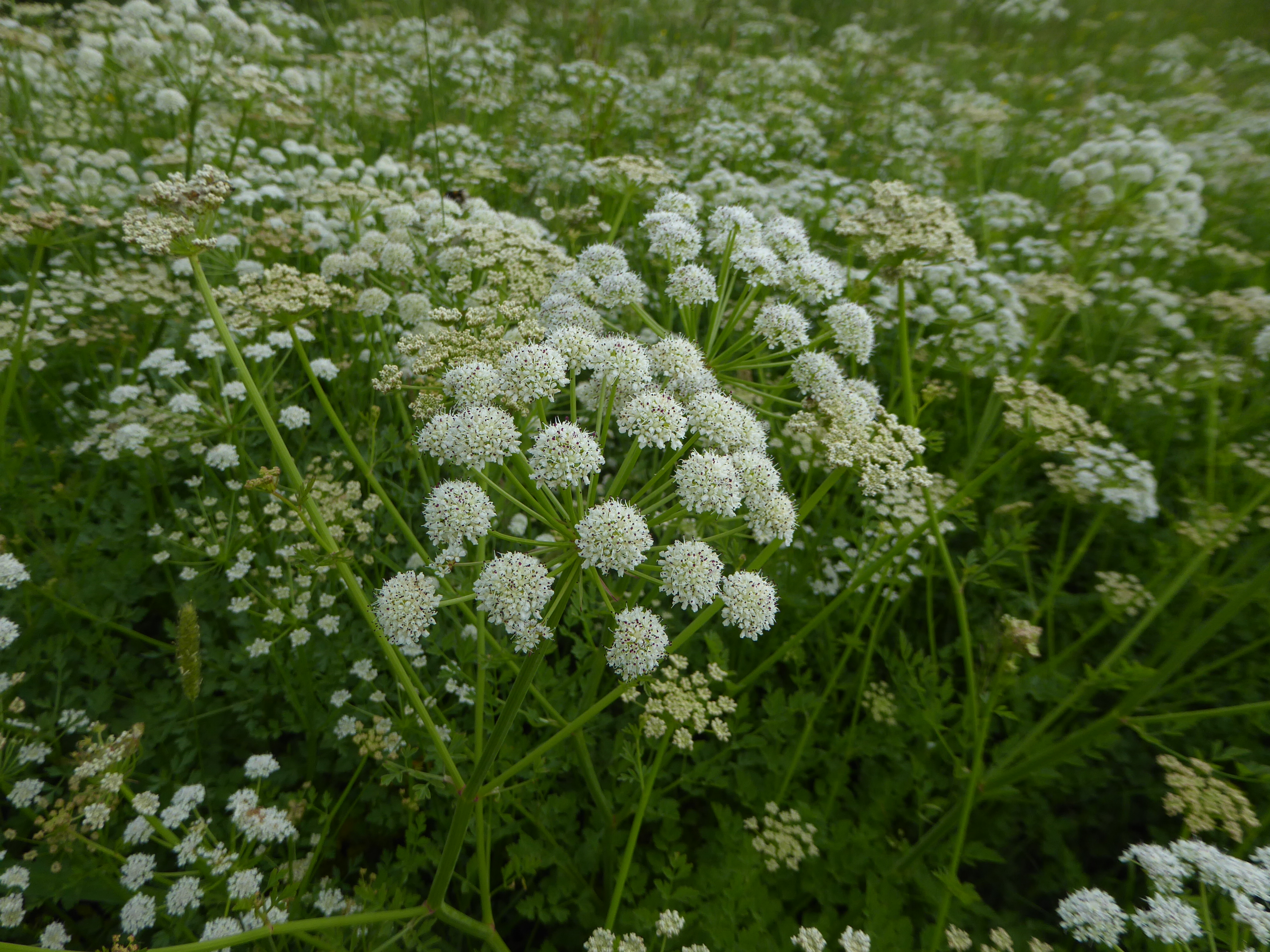
A stand of hemlock water-dropwort in yorkshire fog grassland at Marden, Kent, England

Although it is widespread in a variety of wetland types, there are two main habitats for this species: woodland and grassland. In woodland, it is found in alder carr (mainly W5 Alnus glutinosa in Britain) in bogs and peaty river valleys, and willow carr (chiefly W6 Salix x fragilis) in river floodplains. In both these communities, it can become abundant in open areas where the trees have been thinned by flooding. In alder carr in particular, it is sometimes found with cowbane, which it strongly resembles.

In grassland, the main habitat is MG10 yorkshire fog grassland, which is typically a kind of rush-pasture with associates such as yellow flag, soft rush and cuckooflower. It is common throughout the British lowlands, extending into the upland fringes. It is most abundant in such a habitat, sometimes forming dense stands alongside ditches or around pools and extending over hundreds of square metres.

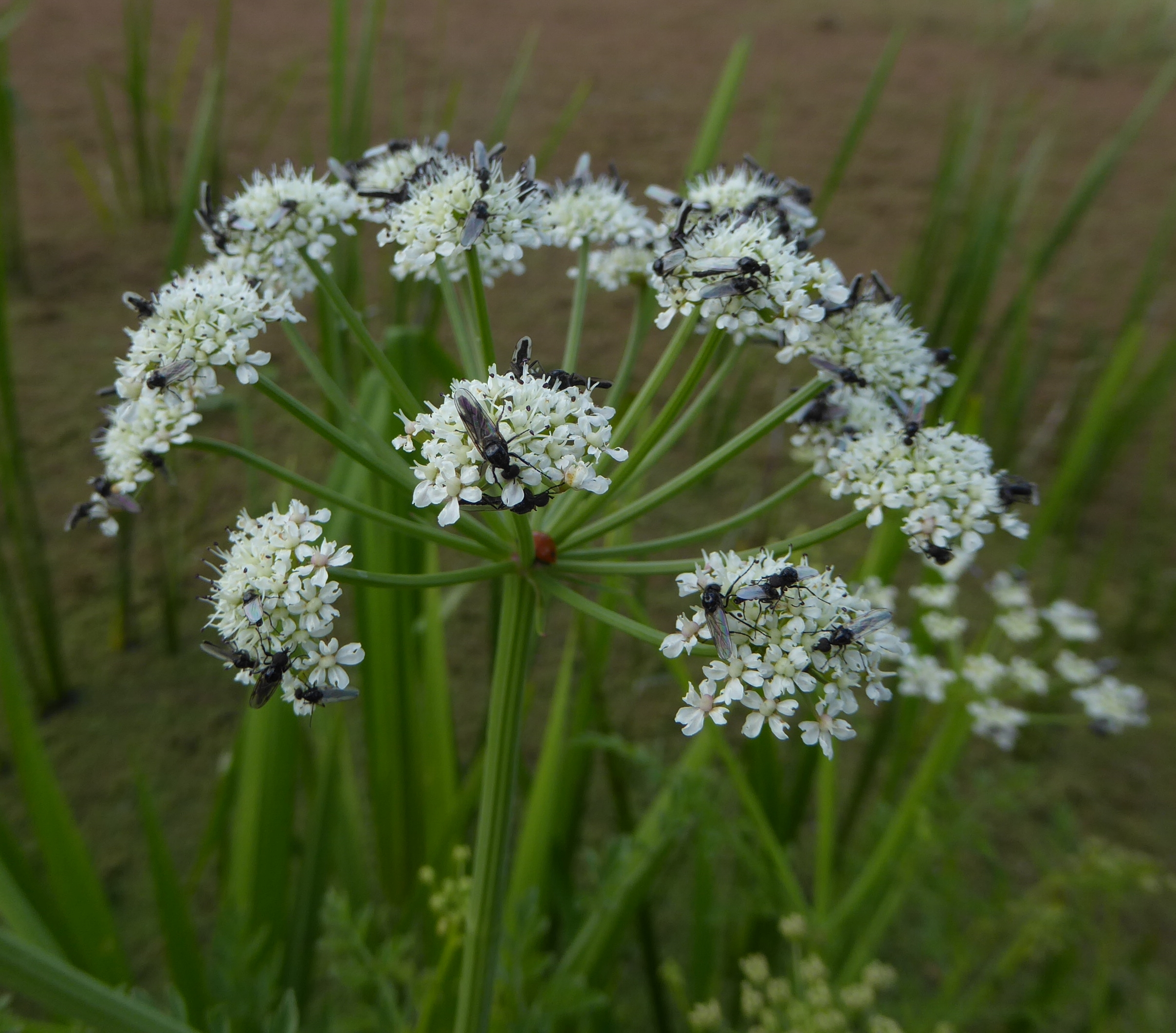
An umbel with numerous St Mark's flies, Dilophus cf. febrilis

Its Ellenberg values in Britain are L = 7, F = 8, R = 6, N = 7, and S = 1, which show that it favours damp, reasonably sunny places with neutral soils and moderate fertility, and that it can occur in slightly brackish situations.

The flowers are unspecialised, meaning they can be pollinated by many species of insect, which are attracted to the nectar that is secreted onto the exposed surface of the stylopodium.

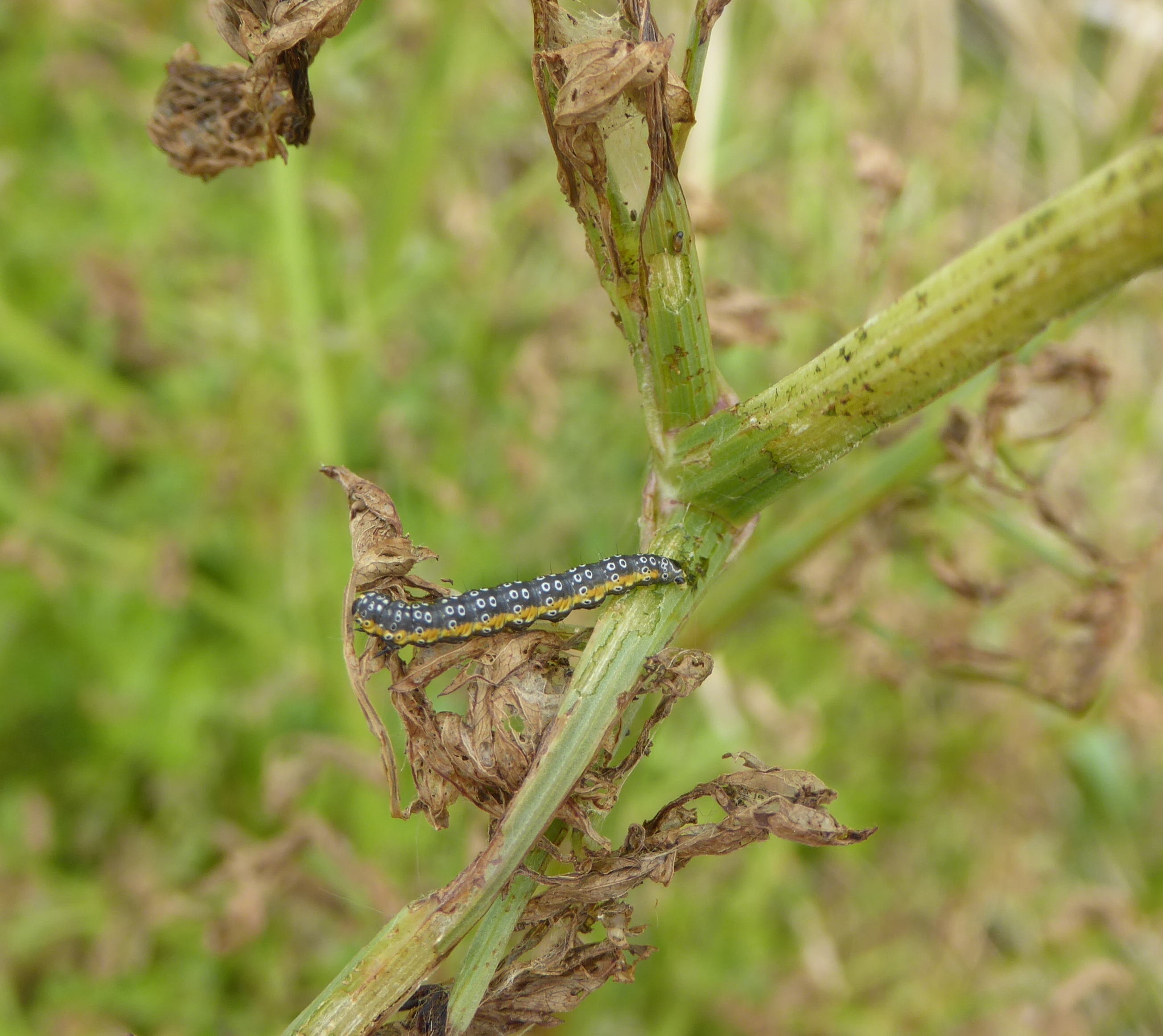
Larva of Depressaria daucella on a defoliated plant of hemlock water-dropwort

Despite its toxicity, there are several species of insect which feed on hemlock water-dropwort. In Britain, these include three types of beetle: Prasocuris phellandrii, Hypera adspersa and Hypera pollux; and three species of fly: Elachiptera cornuta, Chamaepsila rosae and Cheilosia impressa. There is also one bug, Cavariella aegopodii, and three types of Lepidoptera (micro-moths): Depressaria daucella, D. ultimella and Agonopterix yeatiana. The larvae of the fly Euleia heraclei also mine the leaves of this species.

== Toxicity ==
The toxic principle in the plant is oenanthotoxin, a polyunsaturated fatty alcohol that works by blocking γ-aminobutyric acid (GABA) receptors. The plant is very poisonous to humans and livestock and can cause death if poisoning is left untreated after ingestion. Symptoms in livestock include increased salivation, dilated pupils, respiratory distress, and convulsions. Cattle poisoning from this plant occurs sporadically. For example, several cases were reported during the 1995 drought in the West Country, England. Due to the shortage of grass in the fields, the cattle were driven to graze by ditches where hemlock water-dropwort grew.

Instances of poisoning in humans are rare, with only 13 cases reported in Britain between 1900 and 1978, mostly involving children. However, 9 of these 13 were fatal. Serious cases usually involved consumption of the roots, which were mistaken for parsnip. Symptoms include nausea, vomiting, seizures, hallucinations, ataxia, and haemorrhaging of the brain and lungs. Accidental splashing of some sap in the eye of a laboratory worker led to symptoms of poisoning that lasted 12 hours. The Scottish botanist John Lightfoot, in his 'Flora Scotica' (1777) related the experience of the illustrator Georg Ehret, who found that "the smell, or effluvia only, rendered him so giddy that he was several times obliged to quit the room" until he opened the door and windows so that he could finish his work. Being a polyyne, oenanthotoxin is quite unstable, and boiling the roots both lessens the severity of the symptoms and prolongs the delay before they appear.

== Uses and in culture ==
Scientists at the University of Eastern Piedmont in Italy wrote that they had identified Oenanthe crocata as the plant responsible for producing the sardonic grin. The poison constricts the muscles causing death by asphyxia which causes a death grin, the sardonic grin. This plant is a possible candidate for the "sardonic herb", which was a neurotoxic plant referred to in ancient histories. It was purportedly used for the ritual killing of elderly people and criminals in Nuragic Sardinia. The subjects were intoxicated with the herb and then dropped from a high rock or beaten to death.

The essential oils from the seeds of O. crocata have been shown to have moderate antibacterial effect against Enterococcus faecalis and Bacillus lentus. The oils are also anti-inflammatory, antioxidant and anti-fungal (esp. against Cryptococcus neoformans), and they have been suggested for use in counteracting inflammatory diseases. In the past, extracts from this plant have been used in medicine, for example as a treatment for epilepsy, and in Ireland it was apparently commonly used in a poultice for treating skin disorders and even cancers.
