= Oenanthotoxin =

Names
- Preferred IUPAC name (2E,8E,10E,14R)-Heptadeca-2,8,10-triene-4,6-diyne-1,14-diol
- Other names Enanthotoxin

Identifiers
CAS Number	20311-78-8
3D model (JSmol)	Interactive image
ChEBI	CHEBI:144406
ChEMBL	ChEMBL550225
ChemSpider	24616929
KEGG	C20044
PubChem CID	6436464
UNII	4GD5A2RG2N
CompTox Dashboard (EPA)	DTXSID60897236
- InChI: InChI=1S/C17H22O2/c1-2-14-17(19)15-12-10-8-6-4-3-5-7-9-11-13-16-18/h4,6,8,10-11,13,17-19H,2,12,14-16H2,1H3/b6-4+,10-8+,13-11+/t17-/m1/s1 Key: UPXPHJXYZGEBCW-SRFVWEJJSA-N; InChI=1/C17H22O2/c1-2-14-17(19)15-12-10-8-6-4-3-5-7-9-11-13-16-18/h4,6,8,10-11,13,17-19H,2,12,14-16H2,1H3/b6-4+,10-8+,13-11+/t17-/m1/s1 Key: UPXPHJXYZGEBCW-SRFVWEJJBP
- SMILES: CCC[C@@H](O)CC\C=C\C=C\C#CC#C\C=C\CO

Properties
Chemical formula	C_{17}H_{22}O_{2}
Molar mass	258.361 g·mol^{−1}
Melting point	86 °C (187 °F; 359 K)

Hazards
- Lethal dose or concentration (LD, LC)
LD_{50} (median dose)	0.58 mg/kg for mice
- Except where otherwise noted, data are given for materials in their standard state (at 25 °C [77 °F], 100 kPa). verify (what is ?) Infobox references

Oenanthotoxin is a toxin extracted from hemlock water-dropwort (Oenanthe crocata) and other plants of the genus Oenanthe. It is a central nervous system poison, and acts as a noncompetitive antagonist of the neurotransmitter gamma-aminobutyric acid. A case has been made for the presence of this toxin in local Oenanthe species playing a causative role in euthanasia in ancient Sardinia. It was crystallized in 1949 by Clarke and co-workers. It is structurally closely related to the toxins cicutoxin and carotatoxin. Oenanthotoxin is a C17 polyacetylene isomer of cicutoxin.

== Occurrence ==
Oenanthotoxin concentration in plants is dependent on seasonal changes and geographical location, the most is present during late winter and early spring. Contrary to most poisonous plants that contain bitter tastes or burning sensations, the water dropwort has a rather sweet and pleasant taste and odor. Water dropwort is characterized by a yellow liquid that changes color due to air exposure. The roots are the most toxic part, although the entire plant contains poisonous properties.

== History and culture ==
The discovery and use of plants containing oenanthotoxin predates Socrates and Homer and its first use as a poison is thought to have been implemented between 1800 BC and 800 BC in Pre-Roman Sardinia. In Ancient Sardinia, it was considered to be a humane form of euthanasia. Elderly people who were unable to care for themselves were given water dropwort and dropped from a high rock to ensure death. It is also believed that Socrates ingested the plant when executed.

A common symptom of oenanthotoxin is risus sardonicus, better known as the Sardonic Grin, coined by Homer in the 8th century BC, due to the victim's rigid smile after ingestion.

== Mechanism of action ==
Although oenanthotoxin is a relatively well known poison, its mechanism of action is not entirely understood. However, there is evidence that its mechanism of action is similar to that of cicutoxin.

Oenanthotoxin is part of a group of C17 conjugated polyacetylenes that act as noncompetitive gamma-aminobutyric acid (GABA) inhibitors in the central nervous system (CNS). GABA binds to the beta-domain of the GABA_{A} receptor in the central nervous system and activates the receptor increasing chloride ion flow across the membrane and inhibiting the neuron. When oenanthotoxin is introduced to the body, it non-competitively binds to the same beta-domain receptor as GABA and prevents normal inhibitory function. Binding to the same receptor, oenanthotoxin blocks the chloride channel, allowing excessive excitation to occur. This, blocking GABAergic responses, causes hyperactivity in the neurons, resulting in convulsions, and seizures.

=== Symptoms ===
Oenanthotoxin is extremely dangerous and toxic (LD = 0.58 mg/kg for mice), there have been numerous case studies documenting the common symptoms including: convulsions, seizures, nausea, diarrhea, tachycardia, mydriasis, rhabdomyolysis, renal failure, respiratory impairment, and cardiac dysrhythmias.

Below is a comprehensive table listing the recorded symptoms caused by oenanthotoxin within each system in the body Oenanthe crocata:

Organ system	Symptoms
Neurological	slurred speech, dizziness, paresthesia, delirium, ataxia, coma, seizures, trismus, hyperreflexia, opisthotonus, spasms, cerebral edema, status epilepticus
Gastrointestinal	nausea, vomiting, salivation, abdominal pain
Respiratory	congestion, distress, depression, airway obstruction, arrest, apnea
Cardiovascular	tachycardia, brachycardia, hypertension, hypotension, cardiac dysrhythmias, cardiac arrest
Renal	glycosuria, proteinuria, hematuria, oliguria, myoglobinuria, acute renal failure
Musculoskeletal	weakness, muscle spasms, muscle rigidity, rhabdomyolysis
Metabolic	elevated temperature, liver dysfunction, hypokalemia, lactic dehydrogenase, disseminating (intravascular, coagulation), metabolic acidosis, azotemia
Occular	mydriasis
Dermal	diaphoresis, cyanosis, flushed face
