= Phosphetane =

Names
- Preferred IUPAC name Phosphetane

Identifiers
CAS Number	287-26-3
3D model (JSmol)	Interactive image
ChemSpider	24770404
PubChem CID	23356115
UNII	B2KKS6D3B6
CompTox Dashboard (EPA)	DTXSID90633326
- InChI: InChI=1S/C3H7P/c1-2-4-3-1/h4H,1-3H2 Key: RVZJVYCTFGOEHX-UHFFFAOYSA-N
- SMILES: C1CPC1

Properties
Chemical formula	C_{3}H_{7}P
Molar mass	74.063 g·mol^{−1}
- Except where otherwise noted, data are given for materials in their standard state (at 25 °C [77 °F], 100 kPa). Infobox references

A phosphetane is a 4-membered organophosphorus heterocycle. The parent phosphetane molecule, which has the formula C_{3}H_{7}P, is one atom larger than phosphiranes, one smaller than phospholes, and is the heavy-atom analogue of azetidines. The first known phosphetane synthesis was reported in 1957 by Kosolapoff and Struck, but the method was both inefficient and hard to reproduce, with yields rarely exceeding 1%. A far more efficient method was reported in 1962 by McBride, whose method allowed for the first studies into the physical and chemical properties of phosphetanes. Phosphetanes are a well understood class of molecules that have found broad applications as chemical building blocks, reagents for organic/inorganic synthesis, and ligands in coordination chemistry.

== Synthesis ==
Many methods towards the synthesis of phosphetanes have been developed since 1957. The following are the most utilized.

=== McBride method (Electrophilic addition to olefins) ===
The method initially outlined by McBride has been developed for singular alkenes, as well as dienes. Both types follow the same general mechanism: formation of a phosphenium cation from a dichlorophosphine and aluminum trichloride, electrophilic addition by an alkene to the phosphenium, carbocation rearrangement, intramolecular nucleophilic addition of the new alkyl phosphine to the carbocation, and oxidation of the resulting phosphetanium with water to obtain a phosphetane oxide. Limitations of this approach are unpredictable carbocation rearrangement in more complexly branched alkanes, the incompatibility of carbocations with many nucleophilic functional groups, and the risk of cation quenching by elimination pathways.

==== Mono-ene addition ====
In the case of electrophilic addition to a single alkene, carbocation rearrangement occurs via hydride or alkyl shifts. The general scheme for phosphetane synthesis from mono-enes is given below:

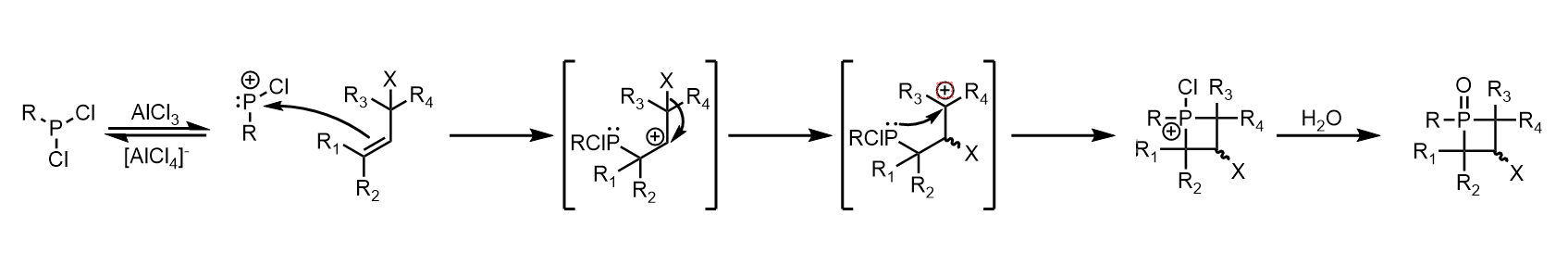
McBride synthesis using mono-ene compounds

==== Diene addition ====
In the case of electrophilic addition to a diene, carbocation rearrangement first occurs via cation-π cyclization. The general scheme for phosphetane synthesis from dienes is given below:

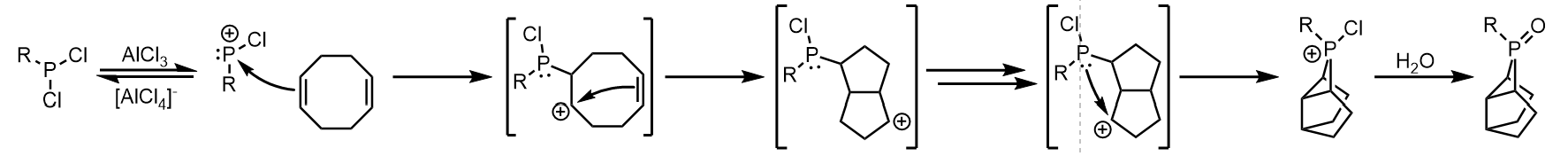
McBride synthesis using diene compounds

=== Alkylation and intramolecular cyclization ===
Alkylation and cyclization pathways have been developed for both phosphines and phosphine oxides.

==== From phosphines ====
The synthesis of phosphetanes from P(III) alkylation and subsequent cyclization usually proceeds through sequential phosphanide/phosphine displacement of 1,3-alkyl dihalides or sulfonate esters (OTf, OTs, OMs, etc.). The phosphanide source is commonly the lithium salt, but can also be accessed by in situ deprotonation of phosphines. The S_{N}2 mechanism associated with this transformation comes with the advantage of stereospecificity, but at the expense of electrophilic or epimerizable functional group tolerance and kinetically slow reactivity with secondary/tertiary leaving groups. The general mechanism is seen below:

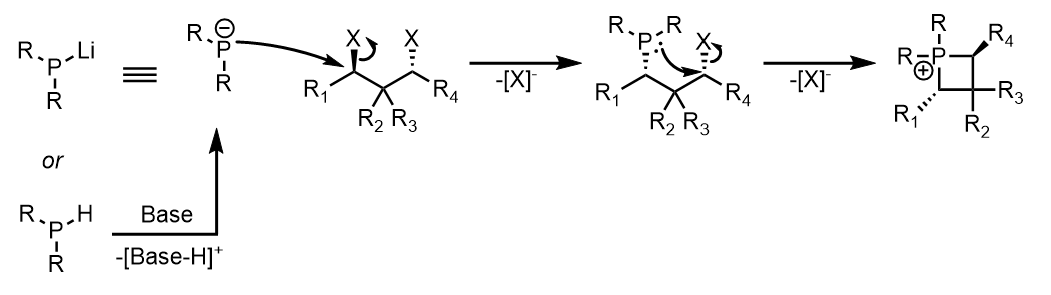
Alkylation/cyclization synthesis from phosphines

==== From phosphine oxides ====
Similar syntheses from P(V) compounds are known but are far rarer due to their relative inefficiency and unpredictability. This preparation features the in situ formation of a Grignard reagent, followed by intramolecular addition/cyclization to a phosphine oxide, all on an n-propyl backbone. This was the method employed by Kosolapoff and Struck in the first synthesis of a phosphetane. The general mechanism is seen below:

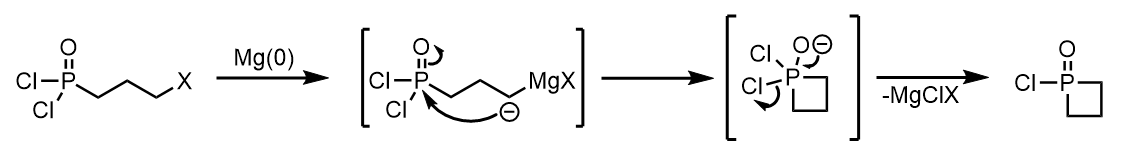
Alkylation/cyclization synthesis from phosphine oxides

=== Cyclopropane ring-expansion ===
Another way to make phosphetanes comes from the ring-expansion of cyclopropanes, in which it seems a phosphine is directly inserted into a C-C bond. The true mechanism of this transformation is similar to that of the McBride synthesis and is sometimes classified as such, with similar advantages and drawbacks. Although relieving the cyclopropane ring strain is of great assistance in the initial C-P bond, exhaustive alkyl substitution to stabilize the formed carbocation is often required. The general mechanism is seen below:

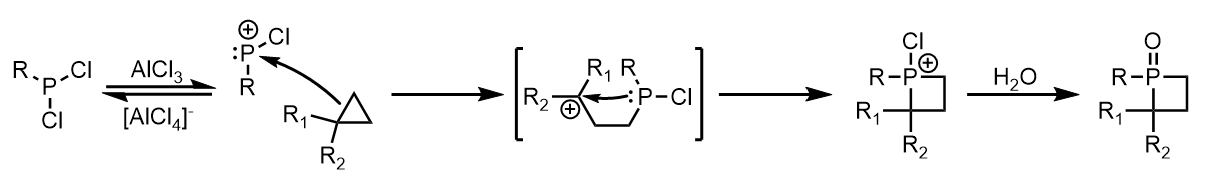
Cyclopropane ring-expansion synthesis

=== [2+2] cycloaddition ===
One final method that has been observed to produce phosphetanes is the [2+2] cycloaddition of phosphaalkenes and olefins. This method is not often discussed for its tendency to produce phosphetanes, but rather for its insight into the reactivity of the much more elusive phosphaalkenes. The difficult synthesis of these phosphaalkenes severely limits the utility of the method as it relates to phosphetane synthesis, despite its attractive stereospecific and modular approach. This usually involves a Lewis acid bound phosphorus, and can occur with electron rich phosphaalkenes and electron poor olefins, or the inverse. An example of each, and the mechanism, are seen below:

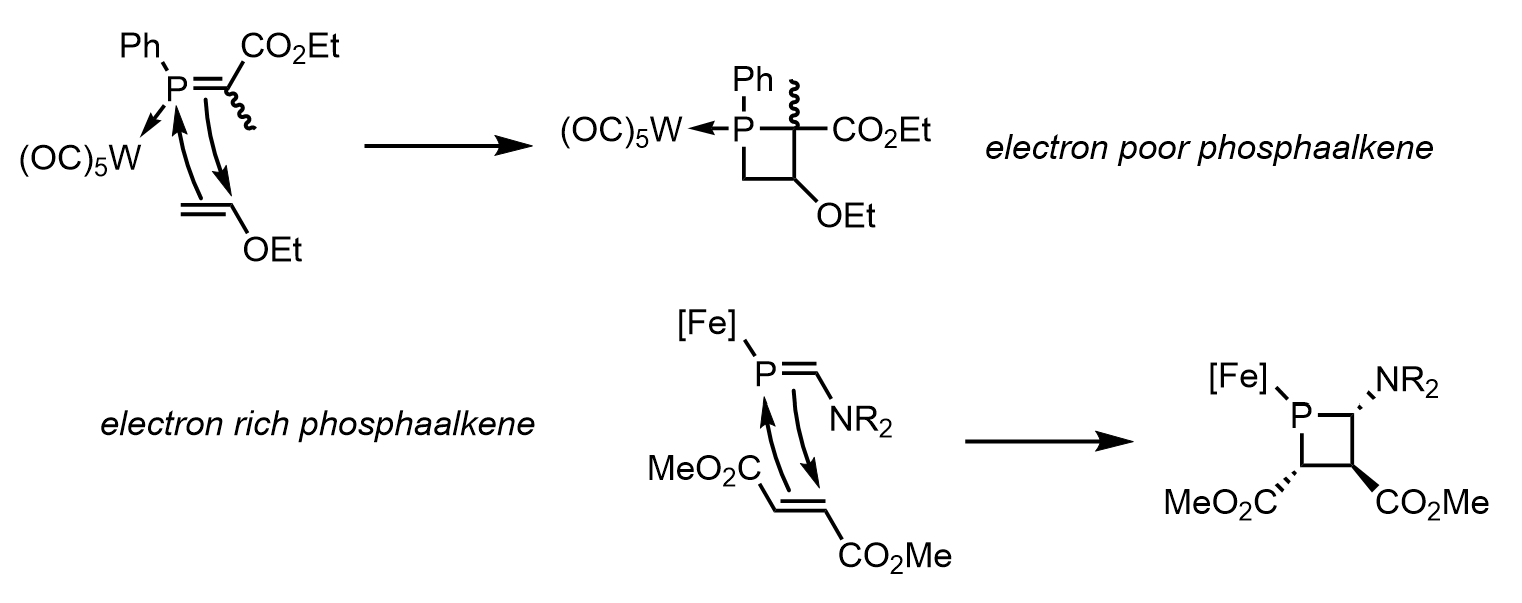
[2+2] cycloaddition synthesis from phosphaalkenes and olefins

== Structure and bonding ==
Experimental and crystallographic data exists for many types of phosphetanes. The PC3 ring is slightly ruffled. Phosphetane oxides and phosphetanium ions are also known For the oxide, one may expect the HOMO is an oxygen lone pair and the LUMO is largely contributed to by the P-O π-antibonding interaction. Phosphetanes with pentacoordinate P are also called phosphoranes.. Such phosphoranes typically adopt structures approximating trigonal bipyramidal and square pyramidal.

== Reactivity ==
Reactivity at the phosphorus center, including reduction, oxidation, and phosphorane formation as well as alkylation of ring carbons can be performed without cleavage of the ring in some instances, representing the final types of inherent reactivity. These four will be discussed in more detail below.

Much of the reactivity of phosphetanes is attribute to ring strain, calculated to be ~17.9 kcal/mol. The release of strain energy drive ring expansion and ring opening. The polymerization has only been sparsely observed in very concentrated solutions.

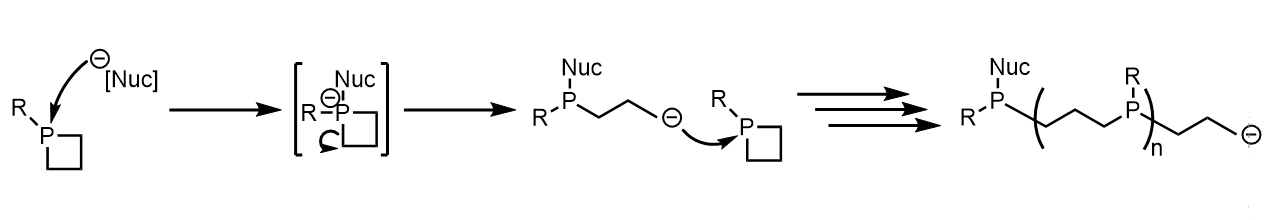
Unobserved ring-opening polymerization

Ring opening accompanies phosphetanium oxidation and α-carbon functionalization.

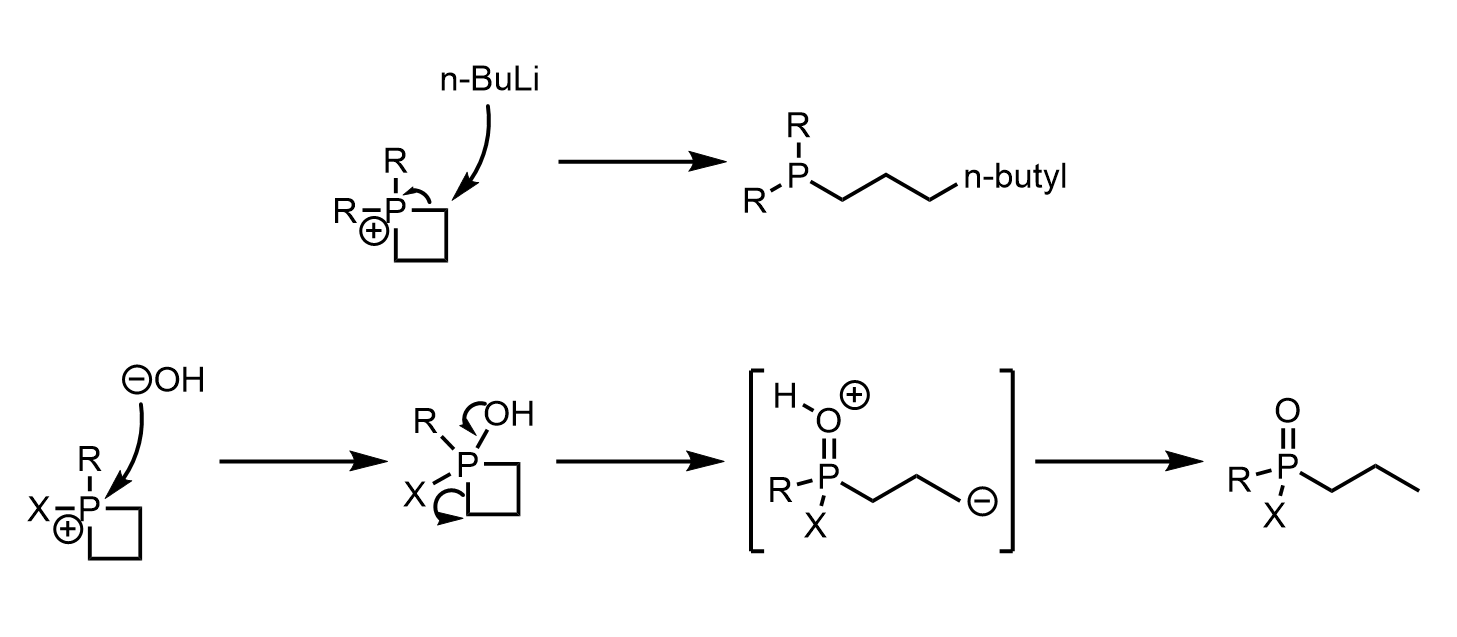
Undesired ring-opening side reactions

One intentional and constructive method of ring-opening has been outlined in the literature and features a phosphetane ylide that undergoes Wittig reactivity with aldehydes to form γ-unsaturated phosphine oxides.

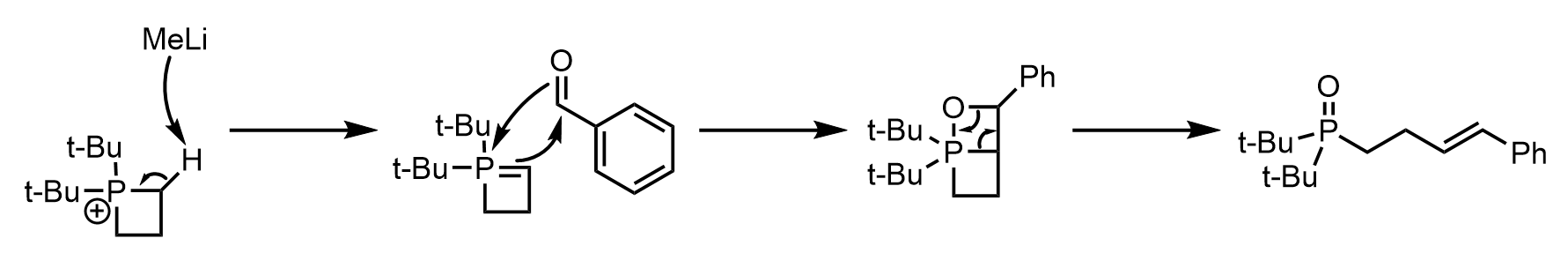
Phosphetanium ylide for ring-opening Wittig reaction

=== Ring expansion reactions ===
Methods of ring expansion to insert carbon, oxygen, and nitrogen atoms into phosphetane rings to produce the corresponding phospholes exist but are of limited synthetic utility due to their unpredictable stereo and regioselectivity on unsymmetric phosphetanes. Insertion of carbon (sometimes known as the Allen–Millar–Trippett rearrangement) typically involves the addition of water to a phosphetanium featuring a leaving group or pi-system (usually enones but also phenyl groups) alpha to phosphorus that is liberated by alkyl migration after collapse of the phosphetane oxide.

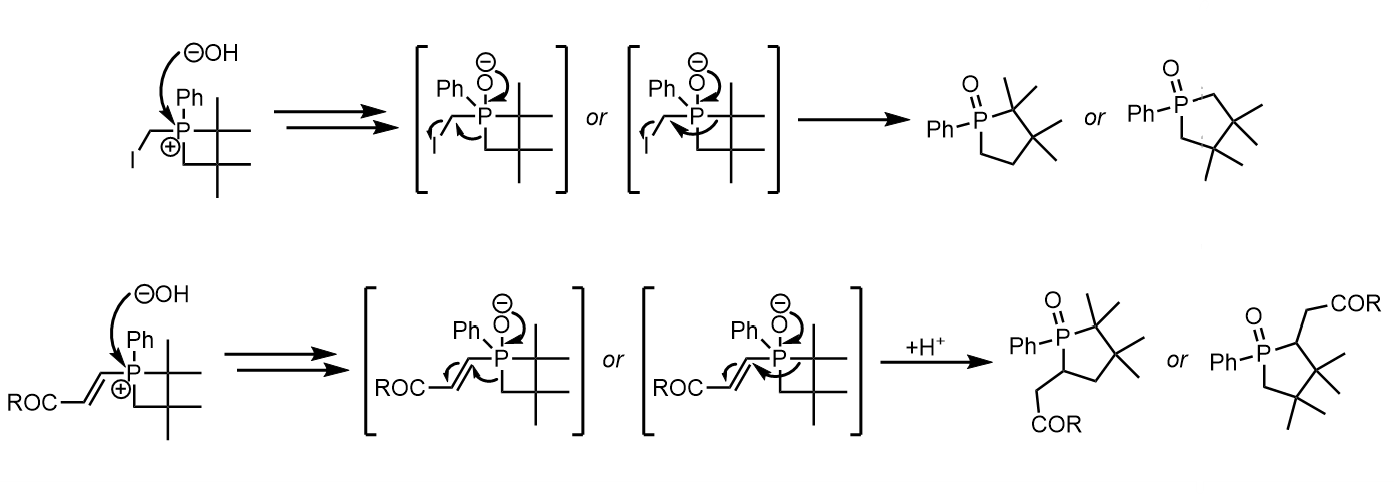
Ring-expansion by carbon insertion

Insertion of oxygen into the P-C bond of a phosphetane oxide is done with mCPBA and proceeds via a currently unknown mechanism with unusually high regioselectivity for the less substituted carbon.

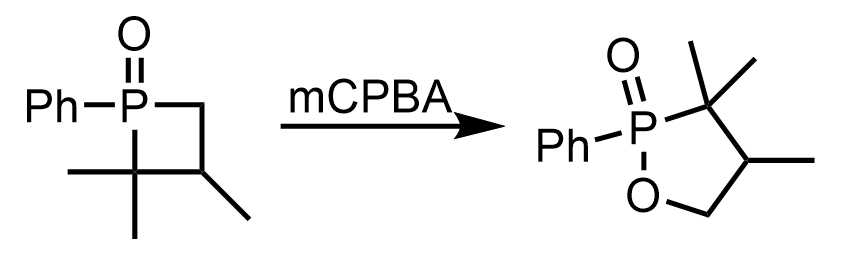
Ring-expansion by oxygen insertion

Nitrogen atom insertion proceeds from photolysis of an azidophosphetane oxide, presumably from a Curtius type rearrangement from the generated nitrene. Though this is the proposed mechanism, there are clear doubts about the N=P=O intermediate.

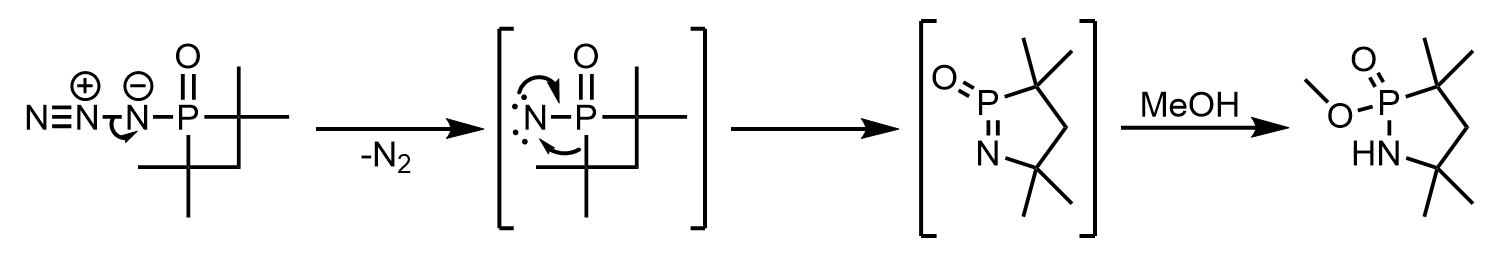
Ring-expansion by nitrogen insertion

=== Redox at phosphorus ===
Redox between P(III) phosphetanes and P(V) phosphetane oxides are well documented through the use of mild reagents such as oxygen or water and silicon hydrides to achieve oxidation and reduction, respectively.

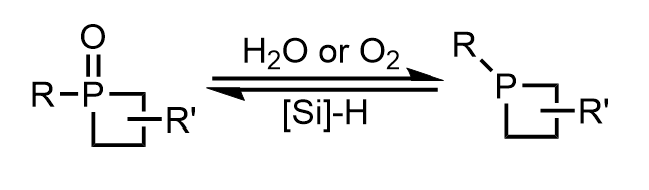
Reversible reduction and oxidation between P(III) and P(V)

Stable 5-coordinate phosphetanes (phosphoranes) are made from both traditional P(III) phosphines and P(V) phosphine oxides, in addition to P(V) phosphetanium ions, via a couple general methods. With respect to phosphine substrates, phosphorane synthesis usually occurs via reaction with peroxides/disulfides or perfluoro π-systems, such as perfluoro acetone, for which the mechanism is unresolved, or perfluoro 1,3-butadiene.

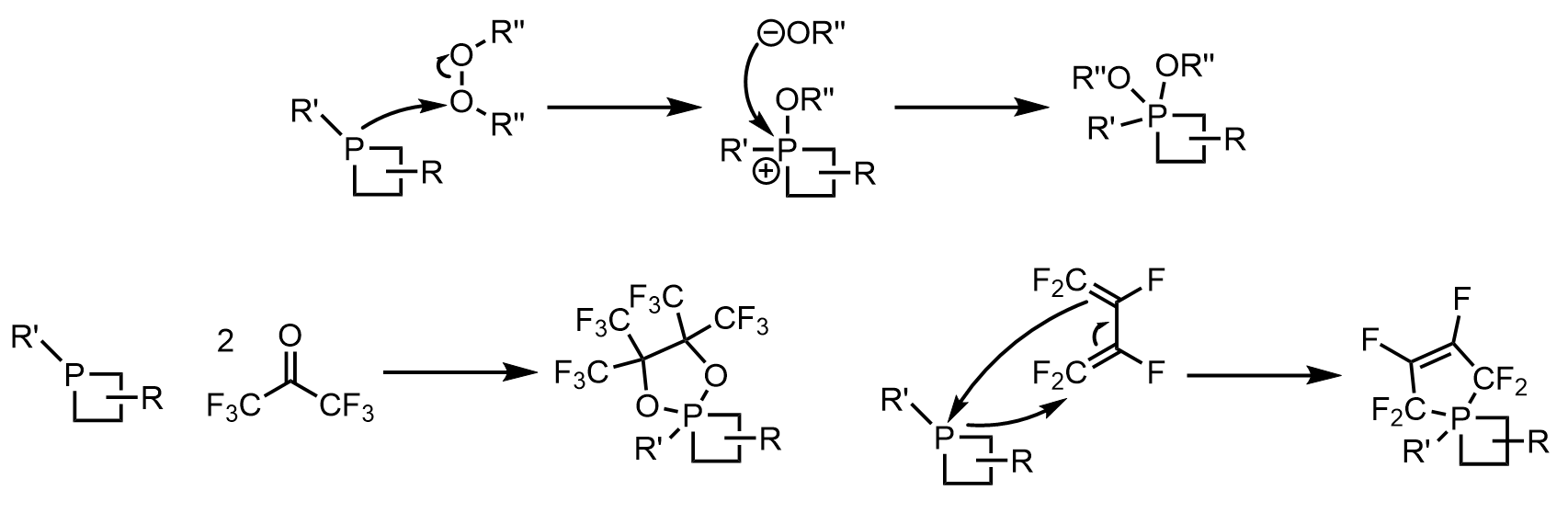
Phosphorane synthesis from P(III) phosphetanes

Methods to access phosphoranes from P(V) oxides and phosphetaniums are usually through stepwise deoxygenation-nucleophilic addition pathways, or direct addition pathways, respectively. Nucleophiles are usually halides or alkoxy functional groups, and in the case of deoxygenation-substitution, the two nucleophiles can be either tethered (e.g. catechol) or not.

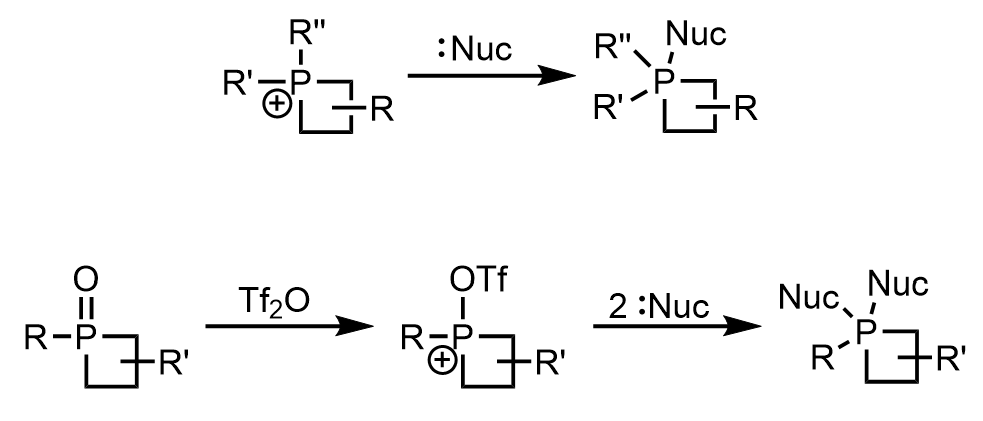
Phosphorane synthesis from P(V) phosphetanes

=== α-Carbon functionalization ===
The final portion of inherent reactivity of phosphetanes to be discussed is the functionalization of the phosphetane oxide alpha carbons, almost always through deprotonation with organolithium reagents, followed by S_{N}2 displacement of an alkyl halide. The use of chiral axillaries on phosphorus can make this process stereoselective.

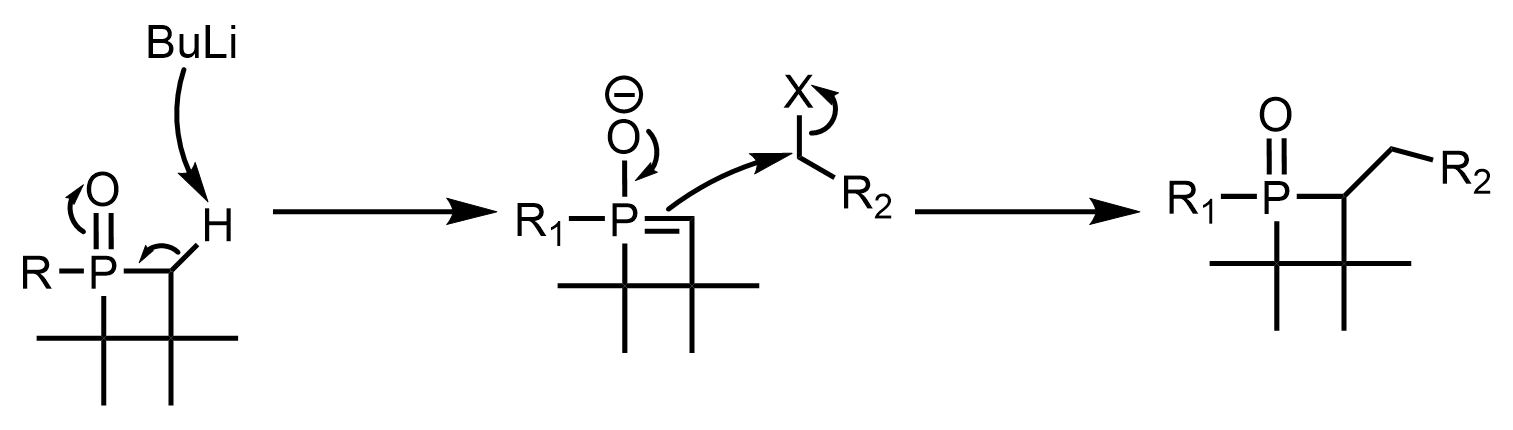
Derivatization of phosphetane α-carbon

=== Reactive intermediates ===
The appearance of phosphetanes and derivatives thereof is well documented in organic chemistry literature as reactive intermediates for a myriad of different processes. These processes include, but are not limited to, Wittig, Horner-Wadsworth-Emmons, Corey-Fuchs, and Seyferth-Gilbert chemistries. All of these processes include the in-situ formation and decomposition of oxaphosphetane intermediates through metathesis-type pathways to form alkenes or alkynes from aldehydes and a phosphorus reagent.

The uncharacteristic biphilic nature of these phosphines, and other non-trigonal pnictogen compounds, is a result of molecular symmetry perturbation, in this case, imposed by the ring strain inherent to phospetanes. Most of these transformations are probed based on stoichiometric reactivity of the phosphetane, illustrating their utility as catalysts or reagents in the event there is substrate incompatibility with the hydride. Below is the general catalytic cycle and an abbreviated list of reactions that can be catalyzed through this method.

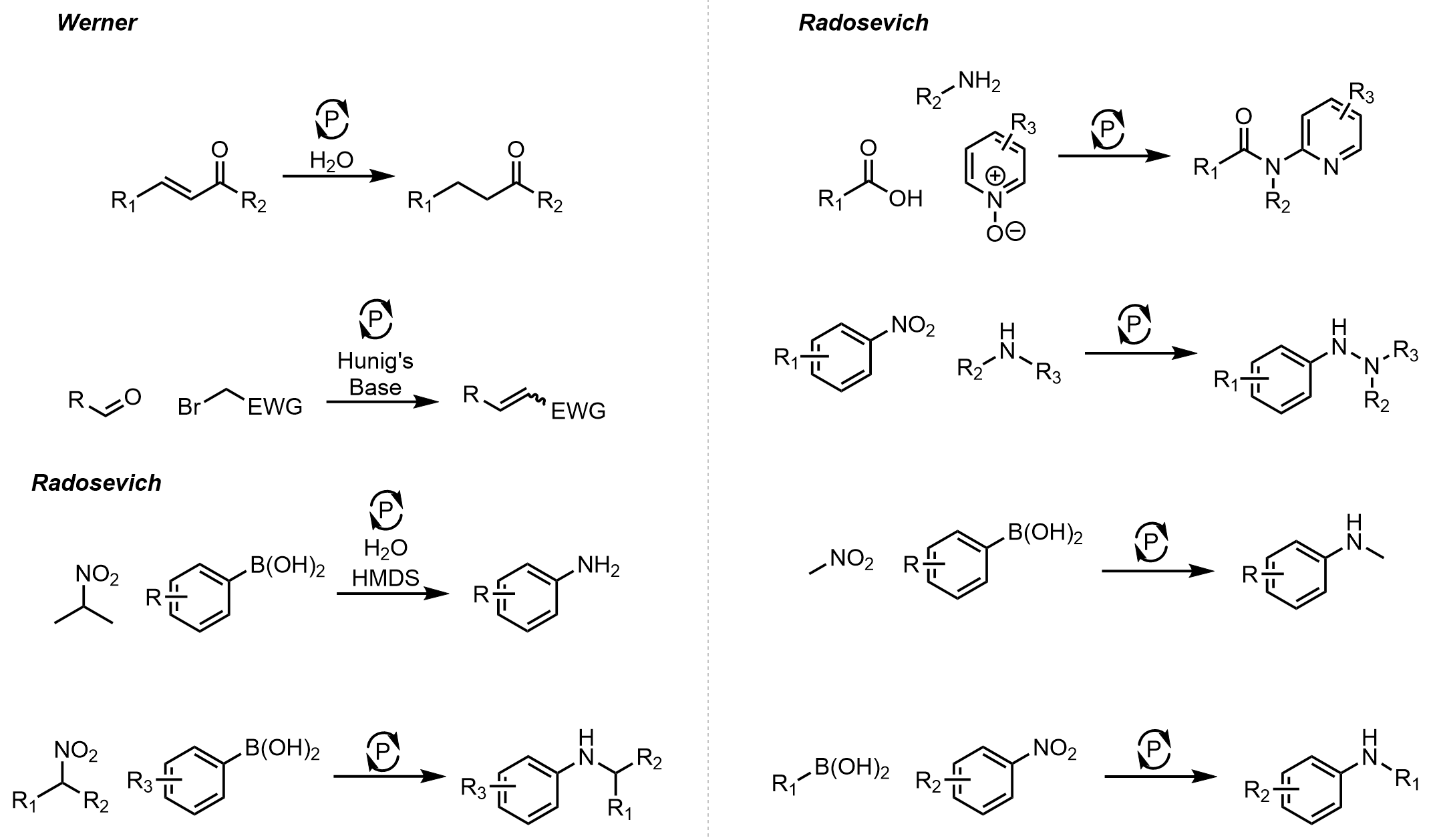
Examples of P(III)/P(V) redox catalysis

=== Ligands for transition metal complexes ===
Transition metal complexes with ligated P(III) phosphetanes are known for tungsten, iron, molybdenum, platinum, ruthenium, rhodium, palladium, iridium, and possibly more, to produce achiral, racemic, and optically pure coordination complexes. Despite these efforts, the intricate details about their nature as ligands and effects on metal centers as it deviates from traditional phosphines is relatively understudied. Direct comparison of classic bis-trialkylphosphinedichloroplatinum(II) complexes with the corresponding phosphetane containing complex possibly enumerate a weakened σ-trans effect and π-accepting character of the phosphetane ligand, most likely due to the aforementioned symmetry distortion, corroborated by short Pt-P (2.208 and 2.210 angstrom) and Pt-Cl (2.342 and 2.355 angstrom) bonds. More work is needed to make this claim categorically.

Most of the study and interest in phosphetanes as ligands is there ability to impart enantioselectivity on certain catalytic hydrogenation, reduction, and π-allyl reactions when using the corresponding chiral phosphetanes. As is the case for most asymmetric catalysis, disfavored steric interaction between chiral ligands, substrate, and other reagents are credited for the observed enantio or diastereoselectivity, though it seems the use of more traditional chiral phosphines has proved more popular than that of chiral phosphetanes. Below are select examples of enantioselective catalysis using phosphetane ligands.

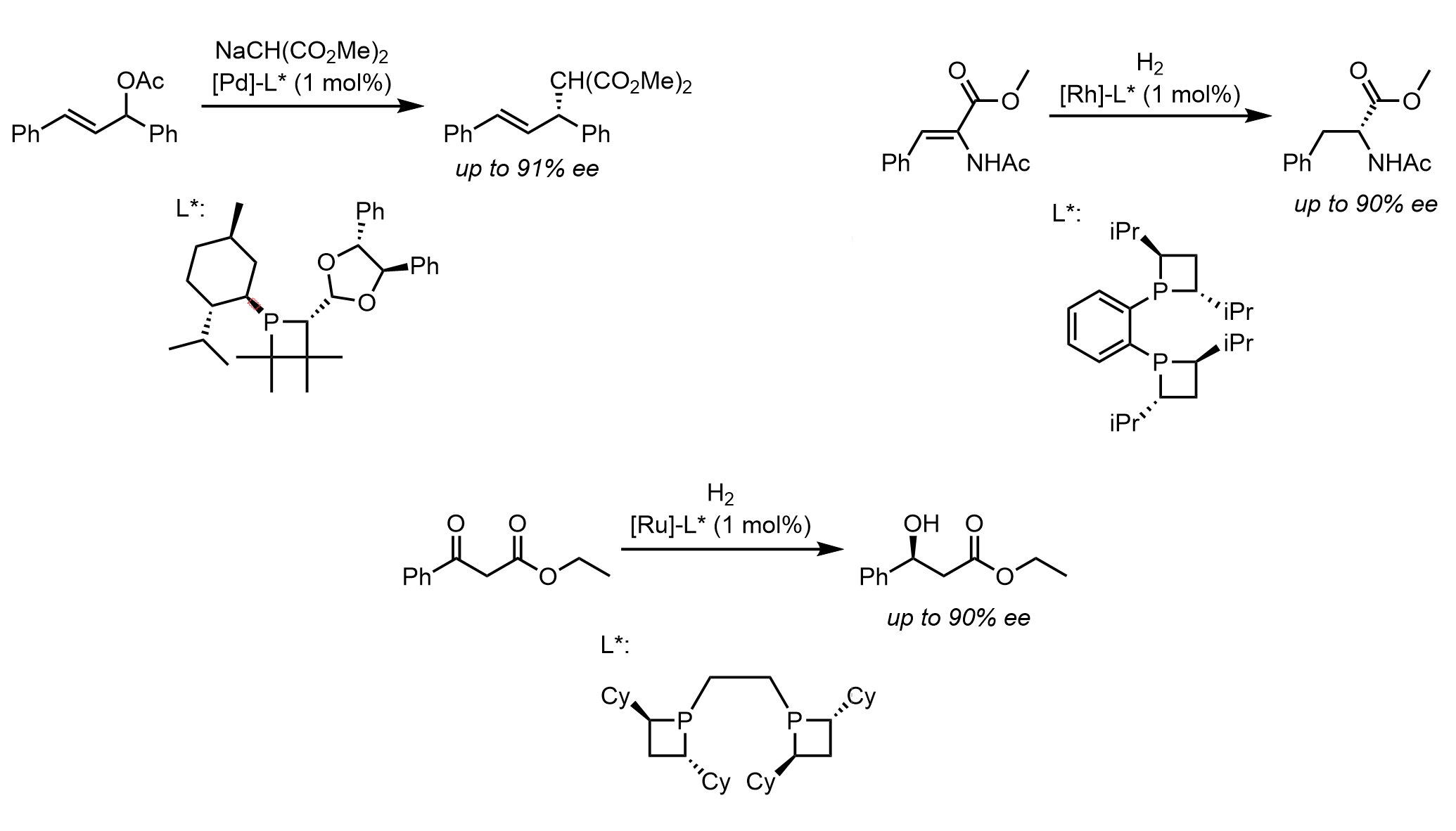
Phosphetane ligands in chiral catalysis
