= Organobismuth radical =

Chemical radical

Organobismuth radical is a chemical species that has unpaired electrons on bismuth centers within organic frameworks. These radicals are part of the broader family of pnictogen-centered radicals, which include nitrogen, phosphorus, arsenic, antimony, and bismuth. Bismuth radicals, with a +2 oxidation state (Bi(II)), are highly reactive and prone to degradation. They are sensitive to air and moisture, often undergoing disproportionation to form more stable bismuth species with different oxidation state: Bi(III) and Bi(0). This instability makes Bi(II) compounds challenging to isolate and handle. Despite these restrictions, significant progress has been made in recent years with the isolation and characterization of Bi(II) radicals. These species exhibit diverse reactivity, particularly in bond activation, radical polymerization, and cross-coupling reactions.

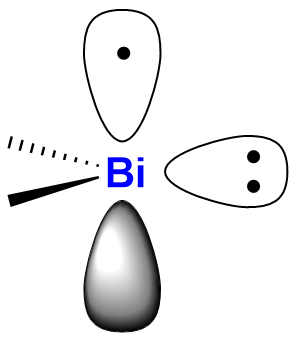
Figure 1. General structure of Bi(II) radicals

== History ==
The first organopnictogen compound with a +2 oxidation state was the dicacodyl, tetramethyldiarsine ((CH_{3})_{2}As–As(CH_{3})_{2}), reported in 1757. However, heavier elements like Sb(II) and Bi(II) compounds were much harder to synthesize due to their high reactivity and tendency to progress via disproportionation reactions into their +3 and 0 oxidation states. As a result, the first Bi(II) compound, tetramethyldibismuthine, was not reported until 1935 by Paneth and Loleit, Following this, a few diorganobismuth(II) compounds were reported after 1982.

Despite these developments, long-lived bismuth-centered radicals remained largely unexplored for decades due to the inherent challenges of stabilizing them both electronically and coordinatively. In 2014, the bismuth radical character was observed in the solution phase, generated in situ through the dissociation of diorganobismuthanes. This was followed in 2015 by the Coles group, first solid-state monomeric Bi(II) radical, which was successfully stabilized by bulky aryl substituents. This marked a turning point, enabling continued exploration of various bismuth radicals and their unique reactivity, which remains an active area of research today.

== Synthesis ==
=== Via reduction of Bi(III) ===
In most cases of bismuth complexes, bismuth has a +3 oxidation state. Therefore, synthesizing bismuth radical species through one electron reduction from Bi(III) complexes would be the most readily accessible route.

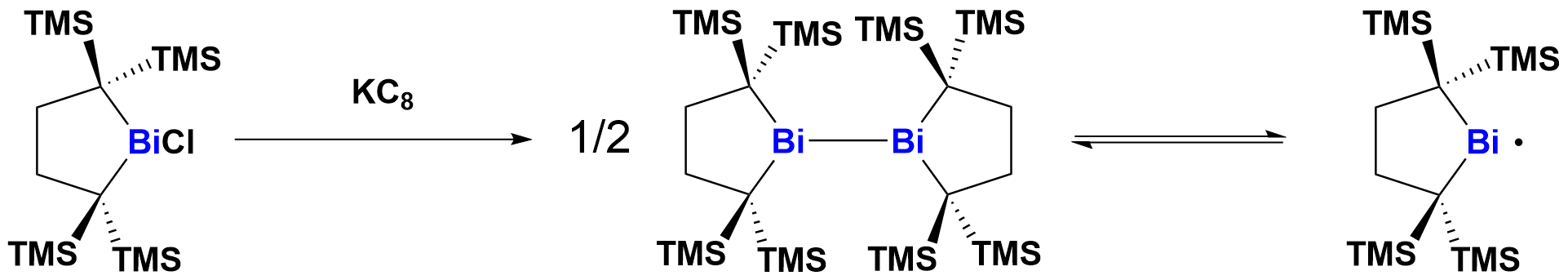
Scheme 1. Generation of bismuth(II) radicals in solution phase

The first persistent solution-state bismuth-centered radical character was reported by Iwamoto and coworkers in 2014. The dibismuthine compound could be obtained by reducing chlorobismuthine with KC_{8} to afford a purple crystalline solid in 47% yield (Scheme 1). Dibismuthine could generate bismuth radicals in the solution phase, by reversible dissociation of the weak bismuth-bismuth bond which results from the steric repulsion of bulky bidentate alkyl groups. The dibismuthine complex exists as a dimer in the solid state, but in solution, bismuth radicals are formed in situ through an equilibrium process. The bismuth radicals were characterized by variable temperature NMR, EPR and UV–Vis spectroscopy. Also, this complex forms a radical coupling product, with the bismuth radical being captured by TEMPO, clearly showing the existence of bismuth radicals in solution. Further research has revealed that these types of transient radical intermediates can also be identified in several forms, including pyridine-dipyrolide ligands (discovered by Turner in 2019) and Bi biradicals with N-terphenyl ligands (discovered by Schulz and coworkers in 2018).

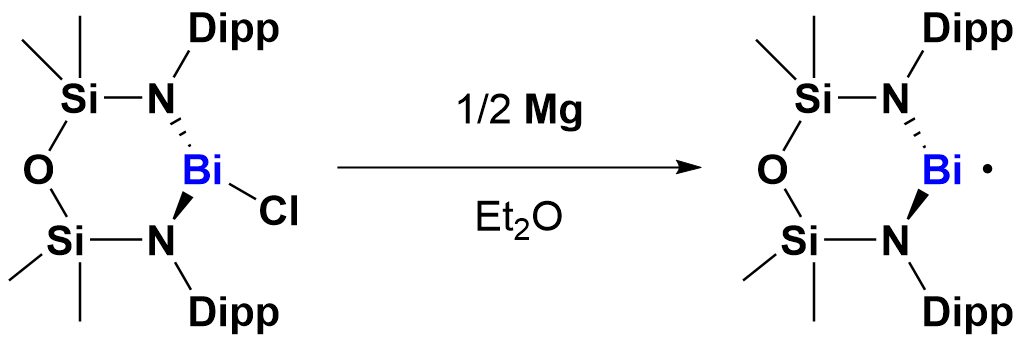
Scheme 2. Generation of a monomeric bismuth(II) radical

In 2015, the first monomeric Bi(II) radical was reported by Coles and coworkers. A diamido bismuth(III) chloride was synthesized via a metathesis reaction from BiCl_{3} (Scheme 2). This tricoordinate bismuth chloride was then reduced using excess Mg, yielding a crystalline bismuth(II) radical as a dark red solid. This method produced a thermally stable, crystalline bismuth radical with a yield 86%. These sterically bulky ligands around the bismuth radicals provide effective kinetic protection, preventing the formation of dibismuthane and allowing the isolation of the monomeric Bi(II) radical instead. The crystal structure and magnetic properties were characterized using single-crystal X-ray diffraction (sc-XRD), ^{1}H NMR spectroscopy with Evans’ method, and EPR spectroscopy.

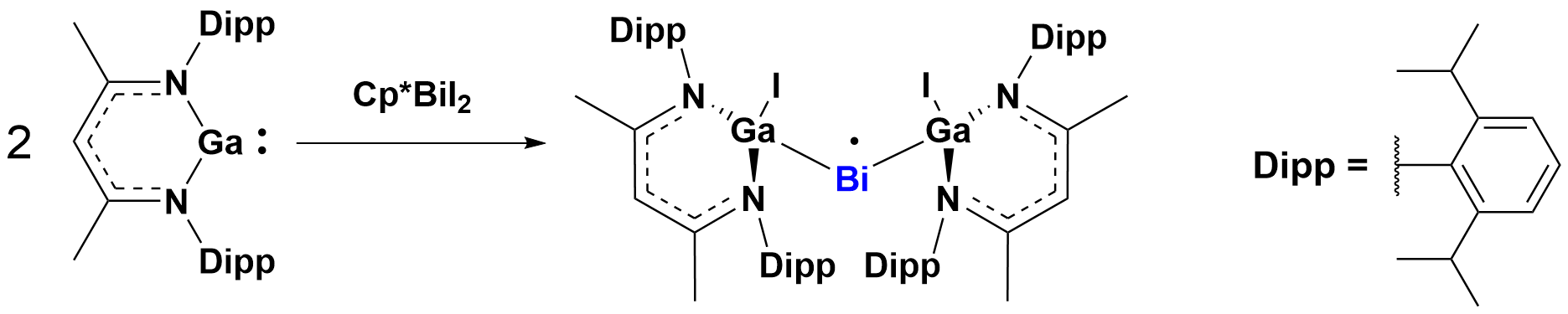
Scheme 3. Generation of bis-gallium(III)-stabilized Bi(II) radical

A stable, monomeric Bi(II) radical in the solid state can be isolated in another form that is stabilized by lewis-acidic metal centers. In 2018, Schulz and coworkers reported another stable Bi(II) radical, supported by two electropositive Ga(III) centers. The Bi(II) radical complex was synthesized through the reaction of Cp^{*}BiI_{2} with 2 equivalents of a Ga(I) complex (Scheme 3). The resulting bismuthinyl radical was fully characterized using sc-XRD, NMR, EPR, SQUID, and DFT studies. The lewis-acidic nature of the Ga ligands facilitates the delocalization of the unpaired electron on the Bi center across the entire ligand, enhancing the radical's stability. In 2020, the same group discovered that this Ga-stabilized Bi(II) radical can also be obtained from BiCl_{3} by reacting it with two equivalents of Ga(I) complexes, as part of their efforts to synthesize polybismuthane clusters.

=== Via homolysis of Bi(III)-E bonds ===
Bismuth, a period 6 pnictogen metal, has large and diffuse atomic orbitals. Due to its diffuse orbitals, the overlap with ligand atoms is often inefficient, resulting in weak bonding. Consequently, many Bi(III) compounds are unstable at room temperature and prone to homolytic cleavage, which readily occurs under thermal or photochemical conditions. The homolysis of Bi–O or Bi–N bonds is frequently employed in such cases, generating unstable and transient bismuth radicals, often accompanied by the formation of phenoxy radicals or nitrogen-centered radicals. There are cases, such as stable Bi(III) phenolates, that produce persistent phenoxy radicals in the solution phase. However, the absence of Bi(II) paramagnetic signals suggests challenges in confirming the radical involvement of transient Bi(II) radicals.

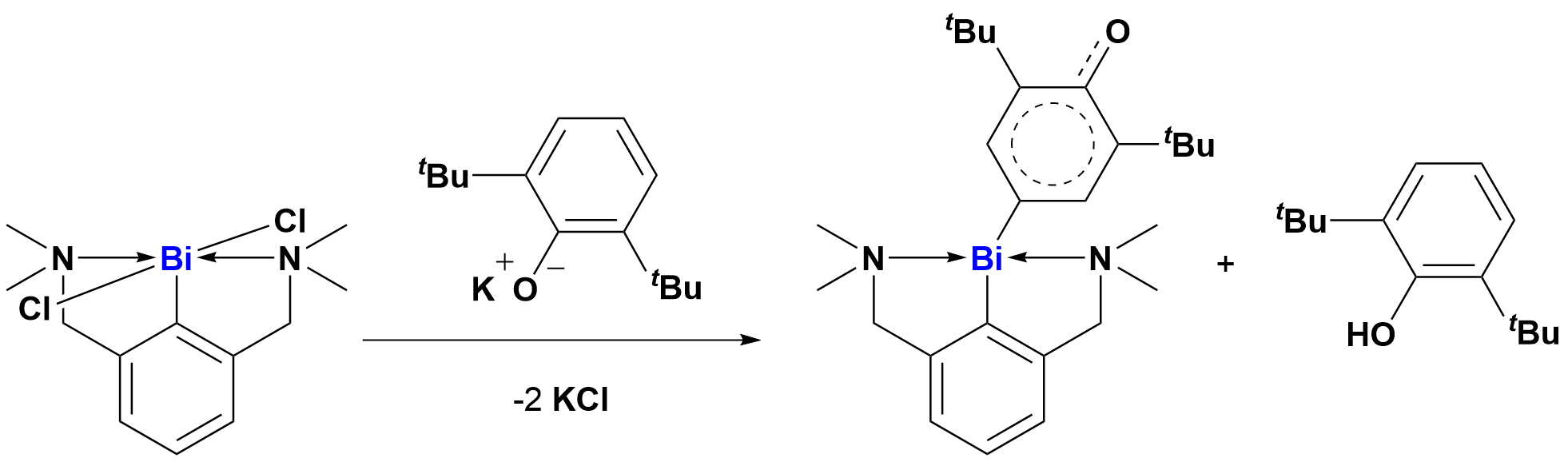
Scheme 4. Bi(III) phenoxide supported by N,C,N-pincer ligand that generates Bi(II) radical

In 2011, William Evans and coworkers reported the Bi radical character resulting from homolysis of a bismuth(III) dichloride complex with N,C,N-pincer ligand (Scheme 4). This Bi(III) compound was reacted with two equivalents of 2,6-di-tert-butyl-substituted potassium phenoxide, resulting in the formation of Bi(III) complex coordinated to an oxyaryl dianion. During this reaction, homolysis of the Bi–O bond generated a phenoxy radical and a Bi(II) radical. The phenoxy radical subsequently isomerized into a carbon-centered radical, which recombined with the Bi(II) radical to form the final product.

In 2022, Josep Cornella and co-workers reported the radical activation of strong N-H and O-H bonds via Bi-O homolysis with bulky phenoxide ligands. In this process, the homolytic dissociation of the Bi-O bond produces a reactive Bi(II) intermediate, leading to the formation of bismuth-amino or bismuth-hydroxyl complexes as a result of bond activation. According to DFT calculations, the coordination of the lone pairs on the N-H and O-H bonds to the Bi(II) center lowers the bond-dissociation energy, enabling the phenoxy radical to cleave these bonds. These complexes were observed in both solution and solid-state through X-ray diffraction.

=== Via oxidation of Bi(I) complex ===
Because of the high reactivity of low-valent bismuth(I) compounds, the generation of Bi(II) radical from single-electron oxidation from Bi(I) complexes is less explored compared to other methods. Thus groundbreaking developments in Bi(I) chemistry, such as the synthesis of a stable, monomeric bismuthinidene facilitated access toward the generation of Bi(II) radicals from Bi(I) complexes.

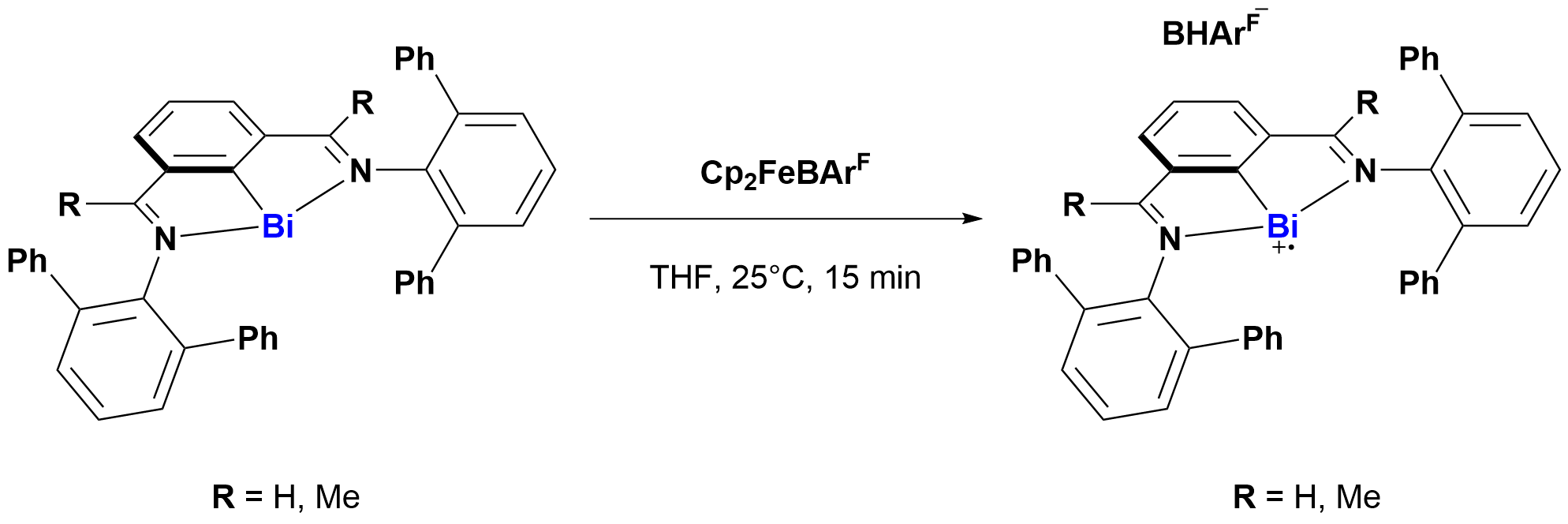
Scheme 5. Stable Bi(II) radical cation by oxidation of bismuthinidene

Monomeric Bi(II) radical cations from the oxidation of N,C,N-pincer-coordinated bismuthinidene were reported by Josep Cornella and coworkers, in 2023 (Scheme 5). These bismuth radicals were obtained in high yield as purple-brown and orange powders through single-electron oxidation of bismuthinidene with one equivalent of ferrocenium BAr^{F}. While highly sensitive to air, these solids can be stored under an Ar atmosphere at –35 °C for several weeks. The crystal structure of the Bi(II) radicals was determined by sc-XRD, and the presence of an unpaired electron was confirmed using SQUID magnetometry, NMR, and EPR spectroscopy.

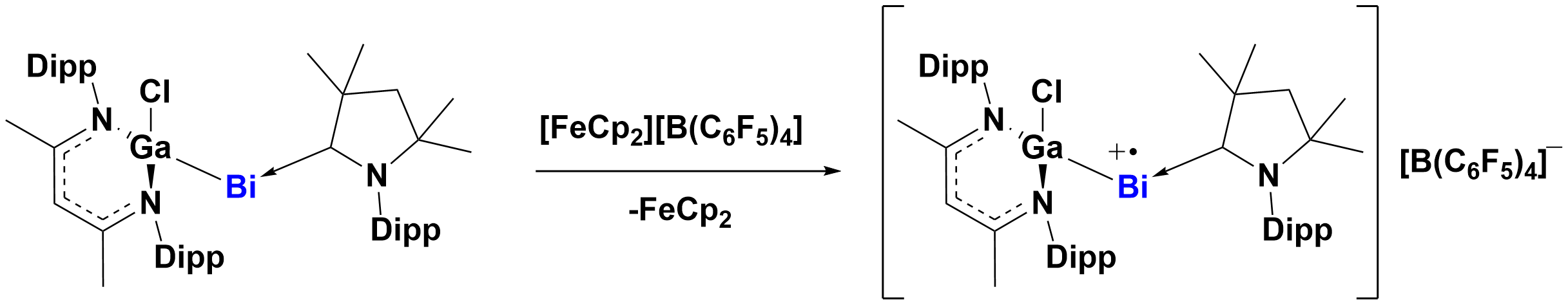
Scheme 6. Carbene-coordinated stable Bi(II) radical cation

A single-electron oxidation of a carbene-coordinated pnictogen complex to obtain Bi(II) radical species was reported by Stephan Schulz and coworkers in 2022. The carbene-coordinated Bi(I) complex was oxidized with ferrocenium cation, leading to the formation of a Bi(II) radical (Scheme 6). Despite its high sensitivity to air and moisture, the electropositive nature of the metal and the π-accepting character of CAACs facilitate the delocalization of unpaired electrons, allowing the Bi(II) radical cation to be stabilized and thus isolated in fluorobenzene and 1,2-difluorobenzene. The radical character was confirmed by EPR spectroscopy and sc-XRD.

Beyond this, redox non-innocent bis(germylene) ligands were also applied in the interconversion of Bi(I) complexes and Bi(II) radicals, as reported by Matthias Driess and coworkers in 2024. The cationic complex and radicals were stabilized by the redox non-innocent ligand, with positive charge delocalized through the Ge atoms in resonance.

== Reactions ==
=== Radical bond activation ===
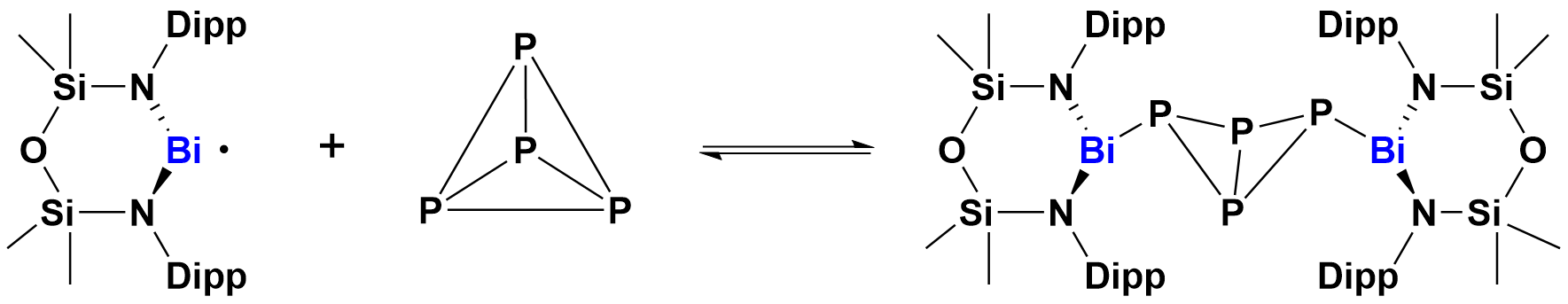
Scheme 7. P-P bond activation through Bi(II) radical

Based on the high reactivity of low-valent bismuth complexes, Bi(II) and Bi(I) compounds demonstrate diverse radical bond activation capabilities, including small molecule activation and oxidative addition processes. Coles and coworkers discovered that isolated Bi(II) radicals can react with white phosphorus (P_{4}, Scheme 7), sulfur (cyclo-S_{8}), and THF, selectively activating single P–P, S–S, or C–O bonds, respectively, to form dimeric bismuth complexes. The steric hindrance provided by the ligand backbone plays a crucial role in facilitating selective bond activation.

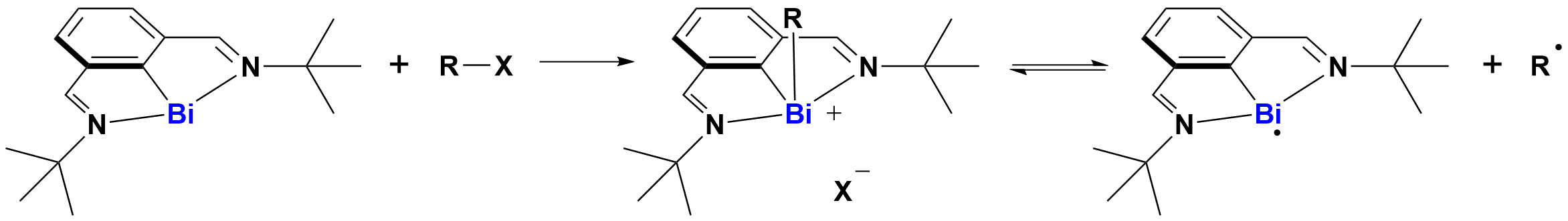
Scheme 8. Single-electron oxidative addition process of C-X bond via bismuth radical

Bi(I) complexes, such as N,C,N-bismuthinidenes can undergo both S_{N}2-type and radical-type oxidative addition reactions. The highly reactive low-valent bismuthinidene can participate in oxidative addition to C–X (X=halide) bonds, leading to the formation of Bi(III) pentacoordinate complexes. In addition to S_{N}2-type oxidative addition, radical-type oxidative addition to bismuthinidene also occurs, producing alkyl-Bi(III) complexes (Scheme 8). These complexes exhibit alkyl-radical-type reactivity, which eventually leads to C–N cross-coupling reactions mediated by bismuth radicals.

=== Bismuth radical catalyst ===
Associated with low homolytic bond dissociation energies of Bi–X bonds (X=H, alkyl, aryl, amide), Bi(II) radicals could facilitate diverse radical-involved chemical reactions such as radical polymerization, cycloisomerization, cyclopropanation, and coupling reactions.

For instance, bismuth radicals can mediate radical polymerization reactions, functioning as both initiators and mediators through the homolysis of C–Bi bonds. Using diphenyl(2,6-dimesitylphenylthio)bismuthine for organobismuthine-mediated living radical polymerization (BIRP) successfully produced a variety of polymers, including polystyrene. The use of this organobismuth compound in the polymerization process prevents undesired loss of the terminal bismuth group.

Additionally, transition metal bismuthanes have been shown to enable selective cycloisomerization of δ-iodo-olefins via radical pathways. The bismuth precursor attached to transition metals (Mn) is transferred to carbon, substituting the previous halogen. These C–Bi bonds enable radical-type isomerization pathways, which can be achieved under thermal conditions.
