= Bismuthinidene =

Class of organobismuth compounds

General structure of a bismuthinidene.

Bismuthinidenes are a class of organobismuth compounds, analogous to carbenes. These compounds have the general form R-Bi, with two lone pairs of electrons on the central bismuth(I) atom. Due to the unusually low valency and oxidation state of +1, most bismuthinidenes are reactive and unstable, though in recent decades, both transition metals and polydentate chelating Lewis base ligands have been employed to stabilize the low-valent bismuth(I) center through steric protection and π donation either in solution or in crystal structures. Lewis base-stabilized bismuthinidenes adopt a singlet ground state with an inert lone pair of electrons in the 6s orbital. A second lone pair in a 6p orbital and a single empty 6p orbital make Lewis base-stabilized bismuthinidenes ambiphilic. Recently, a triplet bismuthinidene is reported by Cornella et al.

The comparatively large covalent radius of bismuth results in weaker bonds between bismuth and other elements.

== Synthesis ==
=== Transition metal-stabilized bismuthinidene ===
The earliest examples of bismuthinidene complexes used transition metal chemistry to stabilize the Bi(I) center. These methods generally use simple bismuth(I) halides or methylbismuth to ligate to tungsten, manganese, and chromium carbonyl complexes. These complexes were occasionally found to oligomerize, forming Bi-Bi single or double bonds to form bismuthane or bismuthene moieties. One of the first examples of a monomeric bismuthinidene was discovered by Balasz et al., who used R = 2-(dimethylaminomethyl)phenyl to chelate a Bi(I) center through a combination of strong C-Bi and weak N-Bi interactions. Although the molecule quickly formed a cyclic oligomer, upon reaction with two equivalents of tungsten pentacarbonyl, monomeric crystalline RBi[W(CO)_{5}]_{2} was isolated.

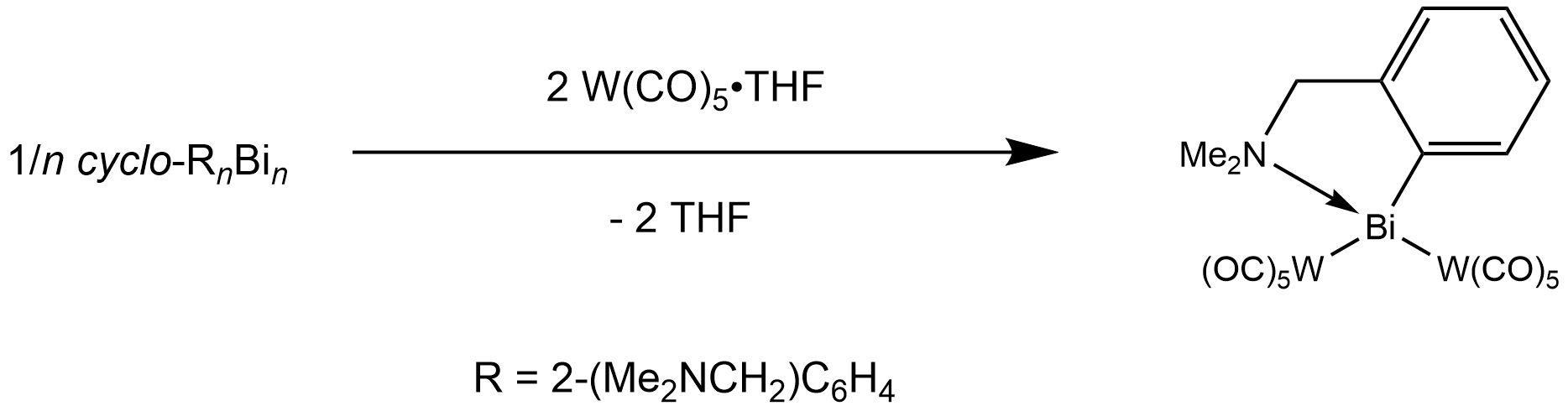
Synthesis of an early example of monomeric bismuthinidene.

=== Lewis base stabilized bismuthinidenes ===
Reduction of ArBi^{III}Cl_{2} (R = 2,6-bis[N-(2’,6’-dimethylphenyl)ketimino]phenyl) gives the Bi(I) derivative. This complex is referred to as "Dostál's bismuthinidene". Many analogs have been prepared by varying the substituents on the aryl or the two imine arms.

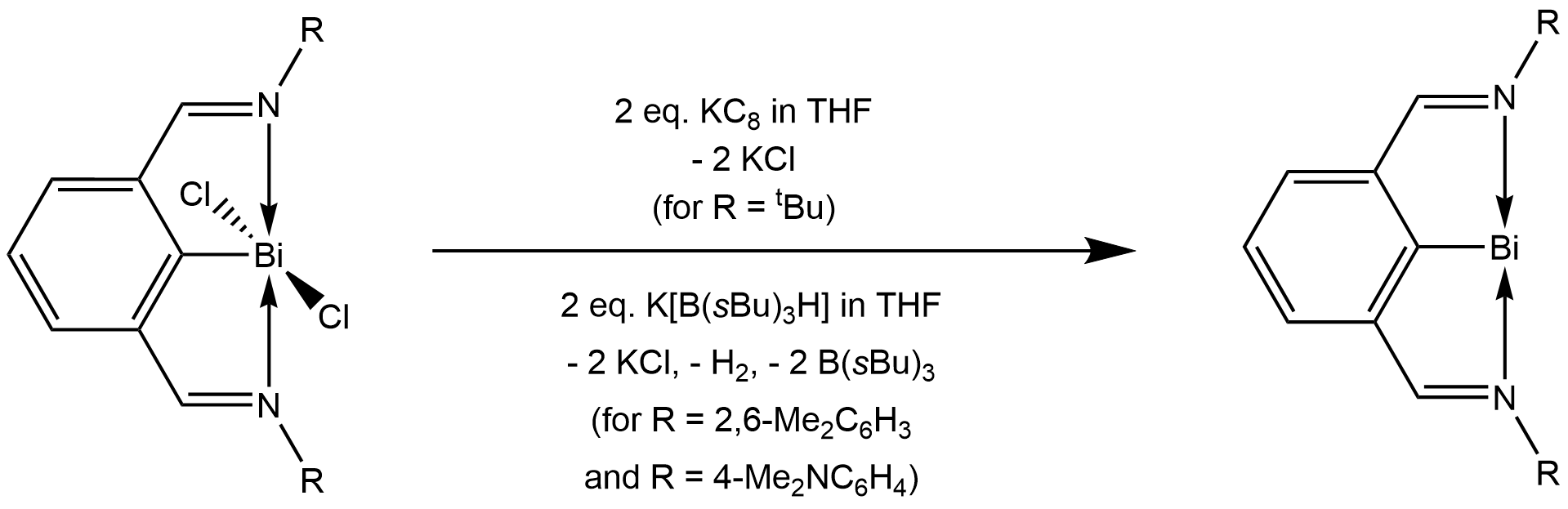
Synthesis of "Dostál's bismuthinidene", the most common example of an N,C,N-coordinated bismuthinidene.

Monomeric bismuthinidene can also be prepared with a bidentate N,C-ligand. Reduction of the bismuth dichloride [C_{6}H_{2}-2-(CH=N-2’,6’-iPr_{2}C_{6}H_{3})-4,6-(tBu)_{2}]BiCl_{2} by two equivalents of K[B(iBu)_{3}H] gives the dark violet bismuthinidene. In contrast to the earlier transition metal-stabilized [2-(Me_{2}NCH2)C_{6}H_{4}]Bi[W(CO)_{5}]_{2}, the tert-butyl group ortho to the bismuth atom in this N,C-coordinated bismuthinidene sterically block the partially empty p-type orbital on the bismuth atom, kinetically stabilizing it without the use of transition metals. In addition, calculated nucleus-independent chemical shift indices (NICS) and anisotropy of current-induced density (ACID) analysis show that the BiC_{3}N ring of the molecule was stabilized by a certain degree of aromatic character due and may be classified as a benzazabismole to the delocalization of six π electrons, despite the nominally dative Bi-N bond. Unlike N,C,N-coordinated bismuthinidenes, this N,C-coordinated species requires the pendant nitrogen atom to be in an imine group, as replacement of the Dipp-substituted imine arm with a diethyl-substituted amine arm resulted in rapid dimerization to a dibismuthene species.

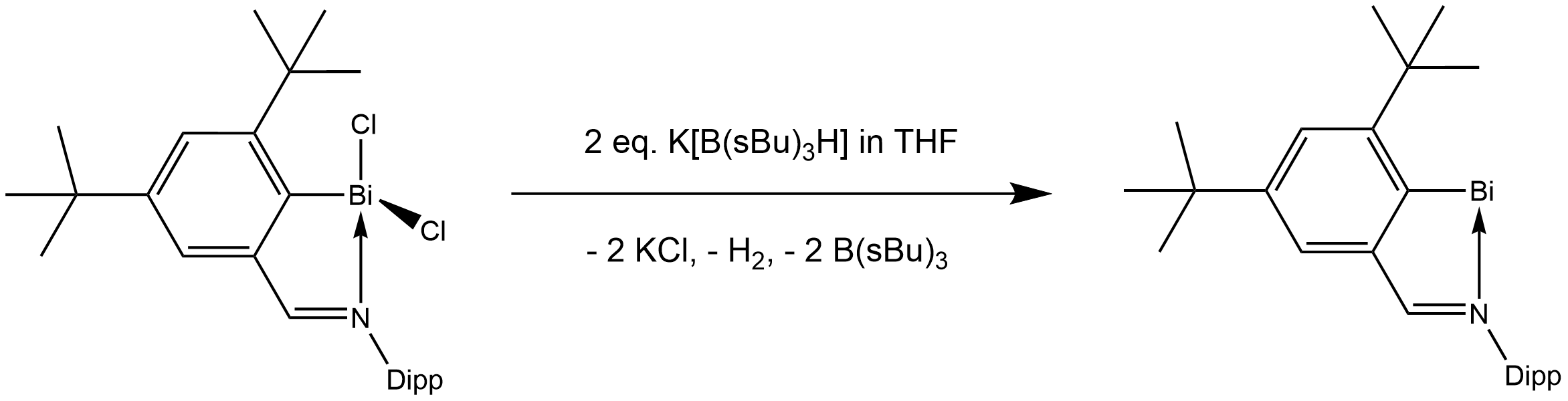
Synthesis of N,C-coordinated bismuthinidene, forming a single five-membered aromatic BiC_{3}N ring.

Cyclic alkyl amino carbenes have also been used to generate bismuthinidenes.

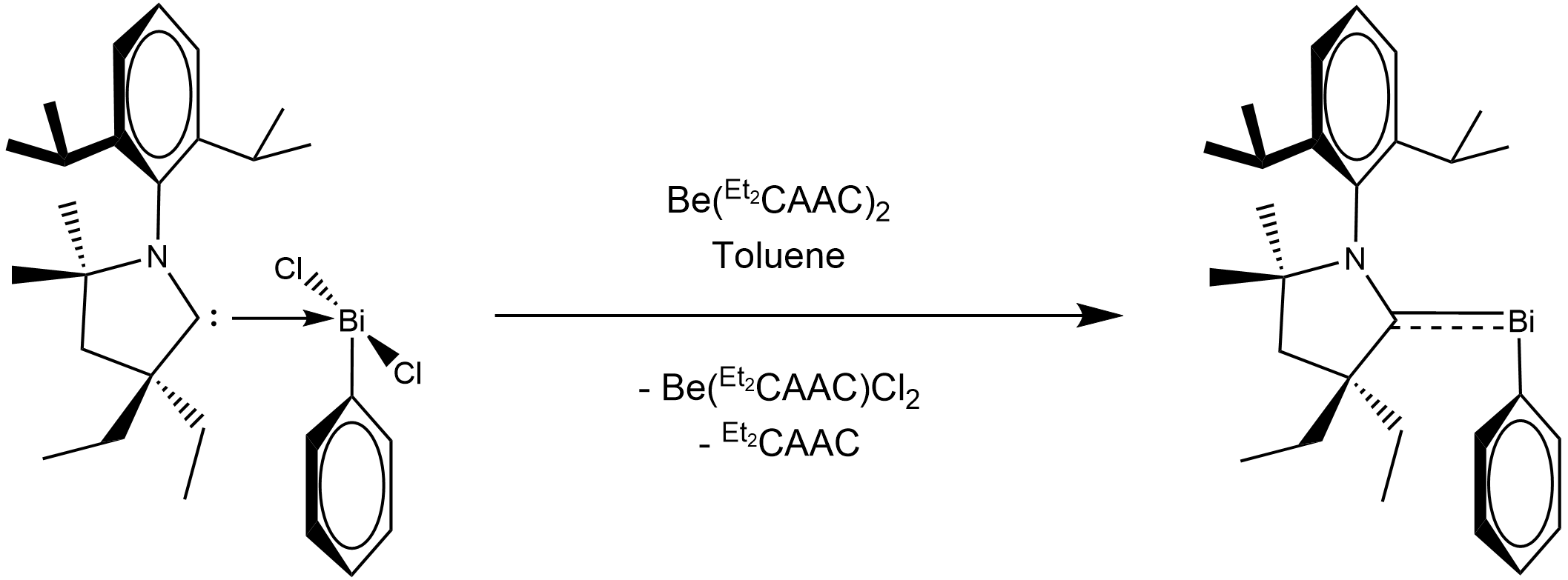
Synthesis of a CAAC carbene-stabilized bismuthinidene complex.

== Structural and electronic properties ==
Bismuthinidene is a carbene analogs. The structural and electronic properties of bismuthinidenes are in large part driven by the inert-pair effect, i.e. the large energy gap between the bismuth atom's 6s and 6p orbitals disfavors the formation of sp hybrid orbitals. In contrast, for the lighter congeners phosphinidenes, their smaller phosphorus 3s-3p energy gap favors a triplet ground state,

Dostál's N,C,N-stabilized bismuthinidene is the most commonly bismuthinidene in the literature. Optimization of the tert-butyl imino version of this compound at the M06/cc-pVTZ level of theory reveals that, as in other nontrigonal pnictogen compounds, the central bismuth atom is coplanar with the N,C,N-coordinating ligand, adopting a T-shaped C_{2v} coordination mode. The Wiberg bond index (WBI) between the bismuth and carbon atoms is 1.09, while the Bi-C bond distance is 2.2156 Å, slightly shorter than the sum of these atoms’ single-bonded covalent radii (Σ_{cov}(Bi,C) = 2.26 Å). On the other hand, the WBI of the Bi-N bonds is only 0.34, and the Bi-N bond distance is 2.500 Å, significantly longer than the sum of these atoms’ covalent radii (Σ_{cov}(Bi,N) = 2.22 Å). This agrees with calculations based on the quantum theory of atoms in molecules (QTAIM), which show that the electron density at the bond critical point between Bi and N is only 0.049, significantly lower than the electron density of 0.114 at the Bi-C bond critical point. Natural bond orbital (NBO) calculations show that these weaker dative bonds arise from weak σ donation of the nitrogen atoms’ lone pairs into an empty 6p orbital on the central bismuth atom. These two n_{N} → p*_{Bi} interactions stabilize the bismuthinidene by as much as 382 kJ/mol. Additionally, the amount of sigma donation from the pendant nitrogen atoms may be increased or decreased by replacing the tert-butyl groups on the pendant nitrogen atoms with aryl groups containing electron-donating groups or electron-withdrawing groups, respectively. One lone pair resides in the bismuth atom's 6s orbital and generally remains inert, while the other resides in the 6p orbital oriented perpendicular to the plane of the central ring, which also comprises the highest occupied molecular orbital (HOMO).

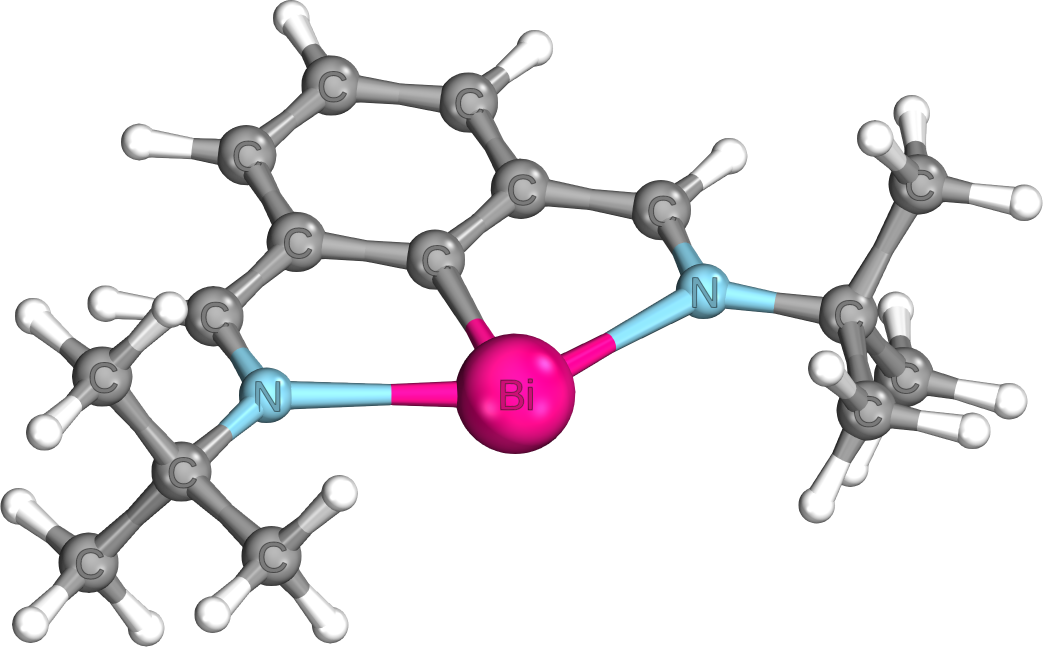
Optimized geometry of Dostál's bismuthinidene

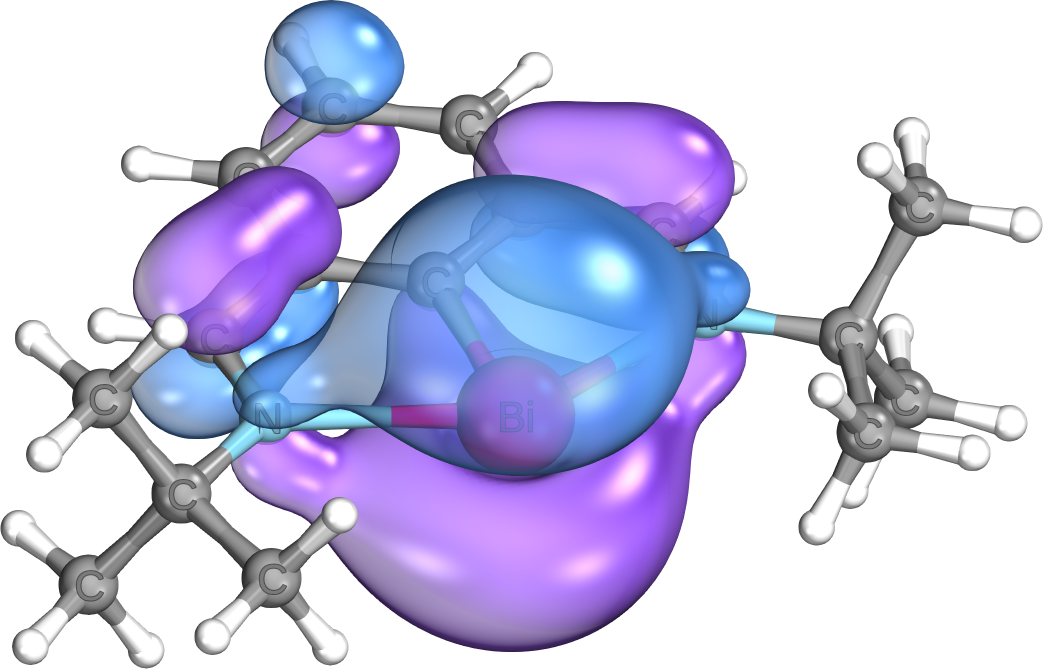
p-type lone pair on Bi

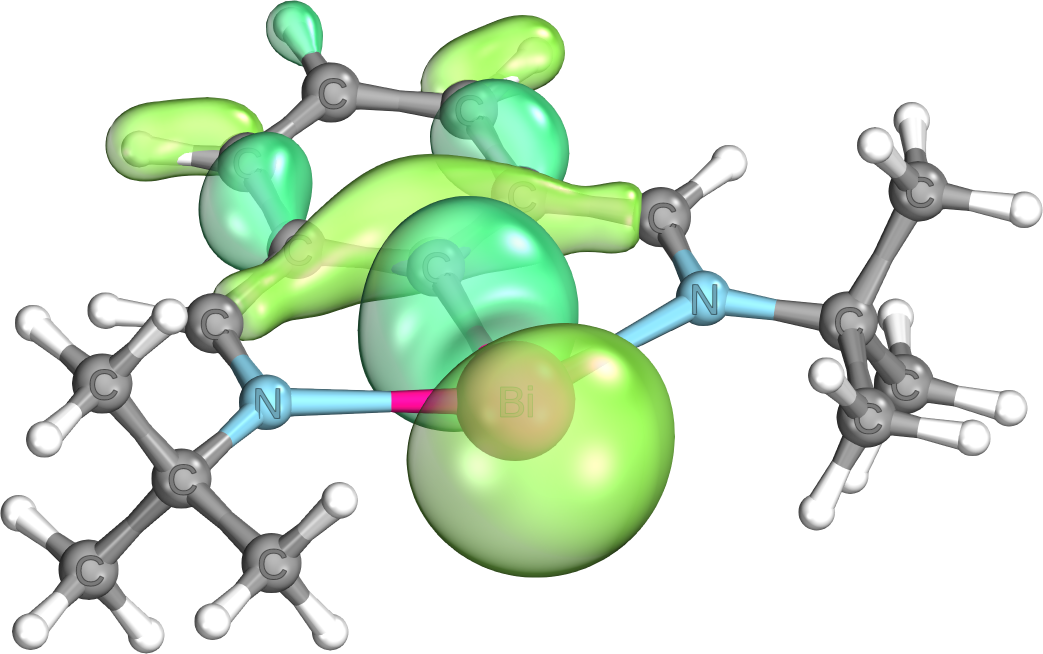
σ-bond between Bi and C

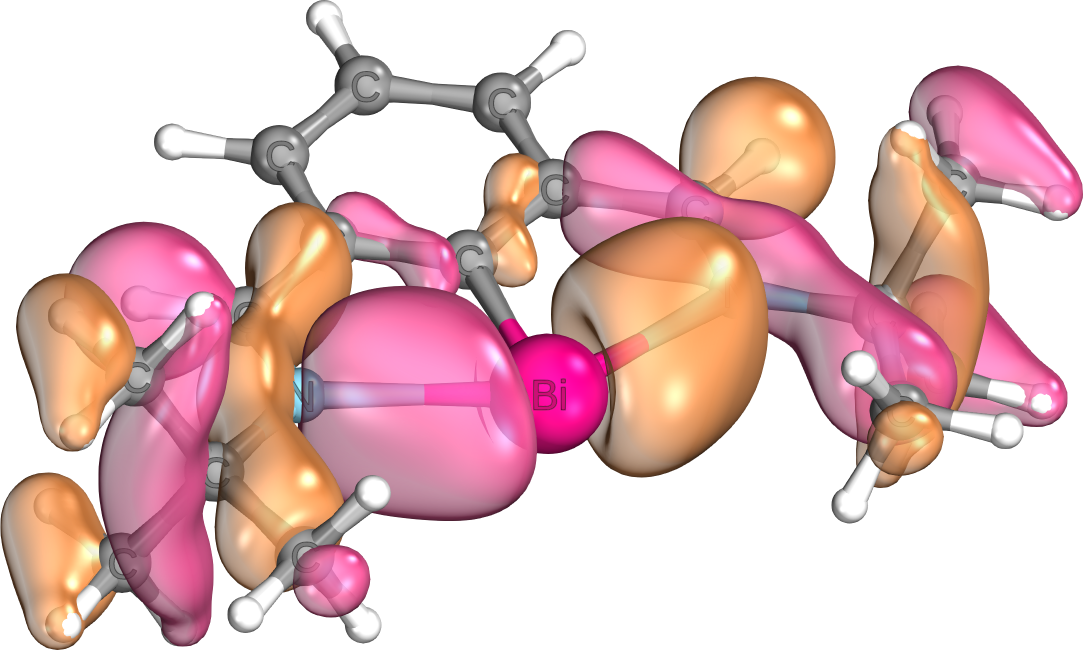
σ-donation of N lone pairs into empty p-type orbital on Bi

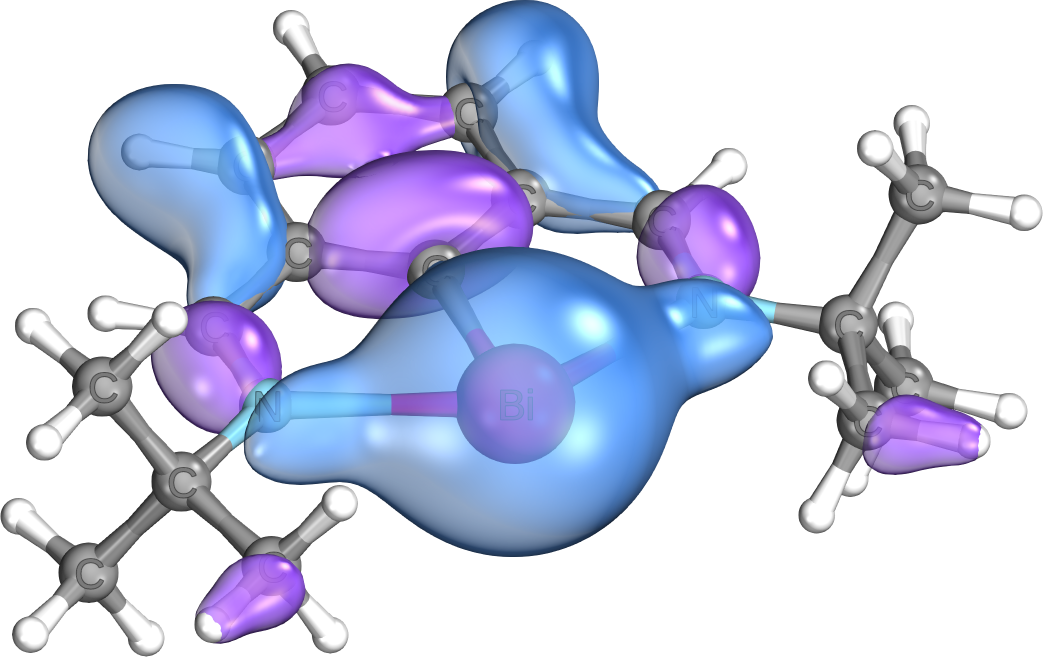
s-type lone pair on Bi

== Reactivity ==
In principle, bismuthinidenes are both Lewis acidic and Lewis basic due to their empty and filled p-type orbitals, respectively. In practice, both N,C,N- and N,C-chelated bismuthinidenes lose much of their Lewis acidic character due to n_{N} → p*_{Bi} donor-acceptor interactions. However, the Lewis basicity of bismuthinidenes, particularly Dostál's N,C,N-coordinated bismuthinidene, allows them to undergo oxidative addition with certain alkyl halides, dichalcogenides, and alkynes to form Bi(III) species.

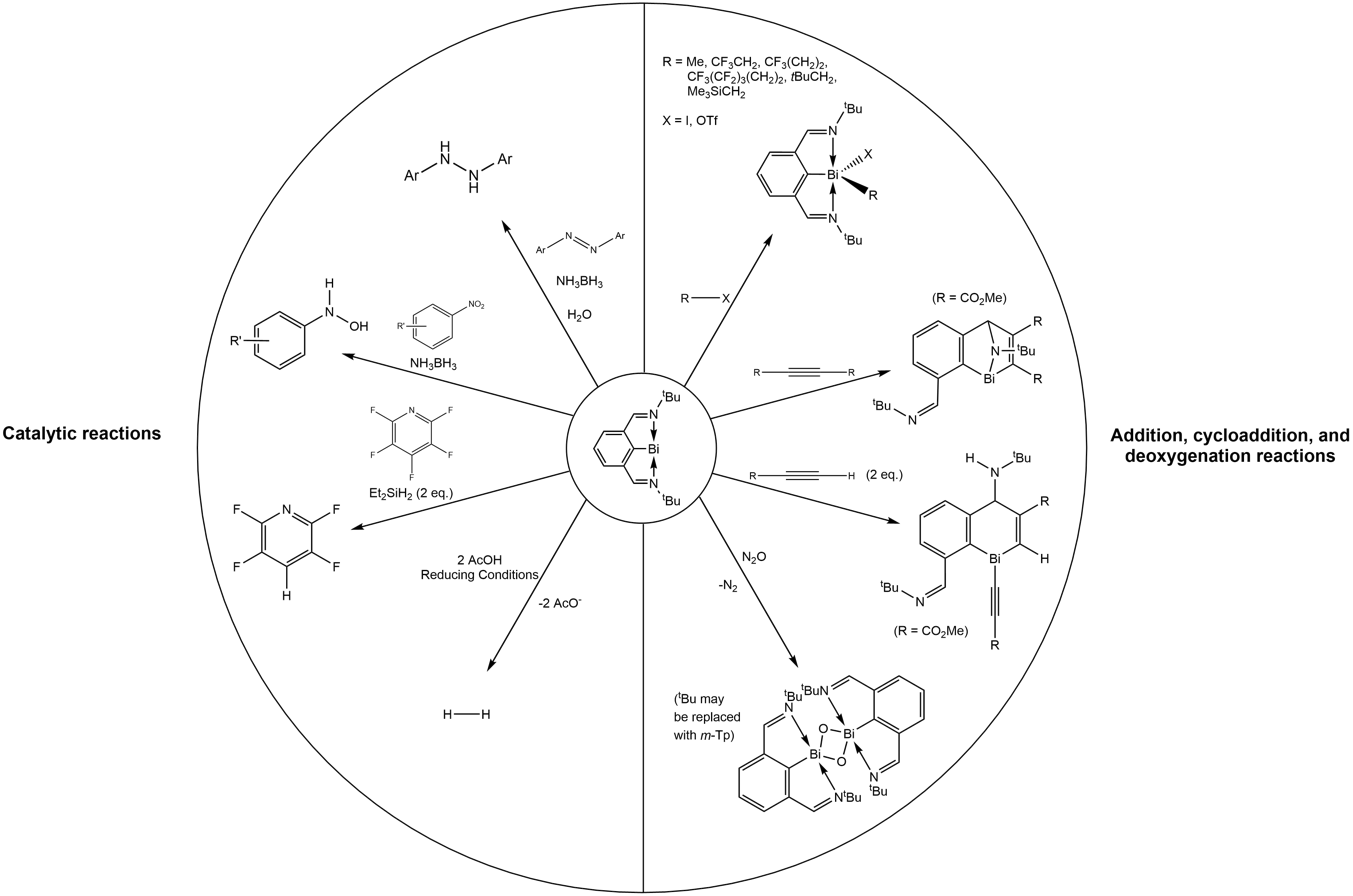
Summary of the reactivity of Dostál's bismuthinidene.

Dostál's bismuthinidene deoxygenates nitrous oxide (N_{2}O) to form arylbismuth oxide dimer. A modified version of Dostál's bismuthinidene with ketimine arms and m-terphenyl substituents on the ketimine nitrogen atoms disfavors dimerization, instead forming a rare monomeric organobismuth(III) hydroxide upon reaction with N_{2}O. In either case, reduction of the product with pinacolborane (HBpin) returns the bismuth(III) centers to the bismuth(I) state and yields a mixture of HOBpin and (pinB)_{2}O, completing the catalytic cycle.

=== Catalysis ===
Bismuthinidenes catalyze a variety of reactions: transfer hydrogenations, deoxygenations, hydrodefluorinations, and dihydrogen formation. Dostál's bismuthinidene catalyzes transfer hydrogenation of azoarenes by ammonia borane and nitroarenes. The catalytic cycle proceeds through a highly unstable bismuthine intermediate.

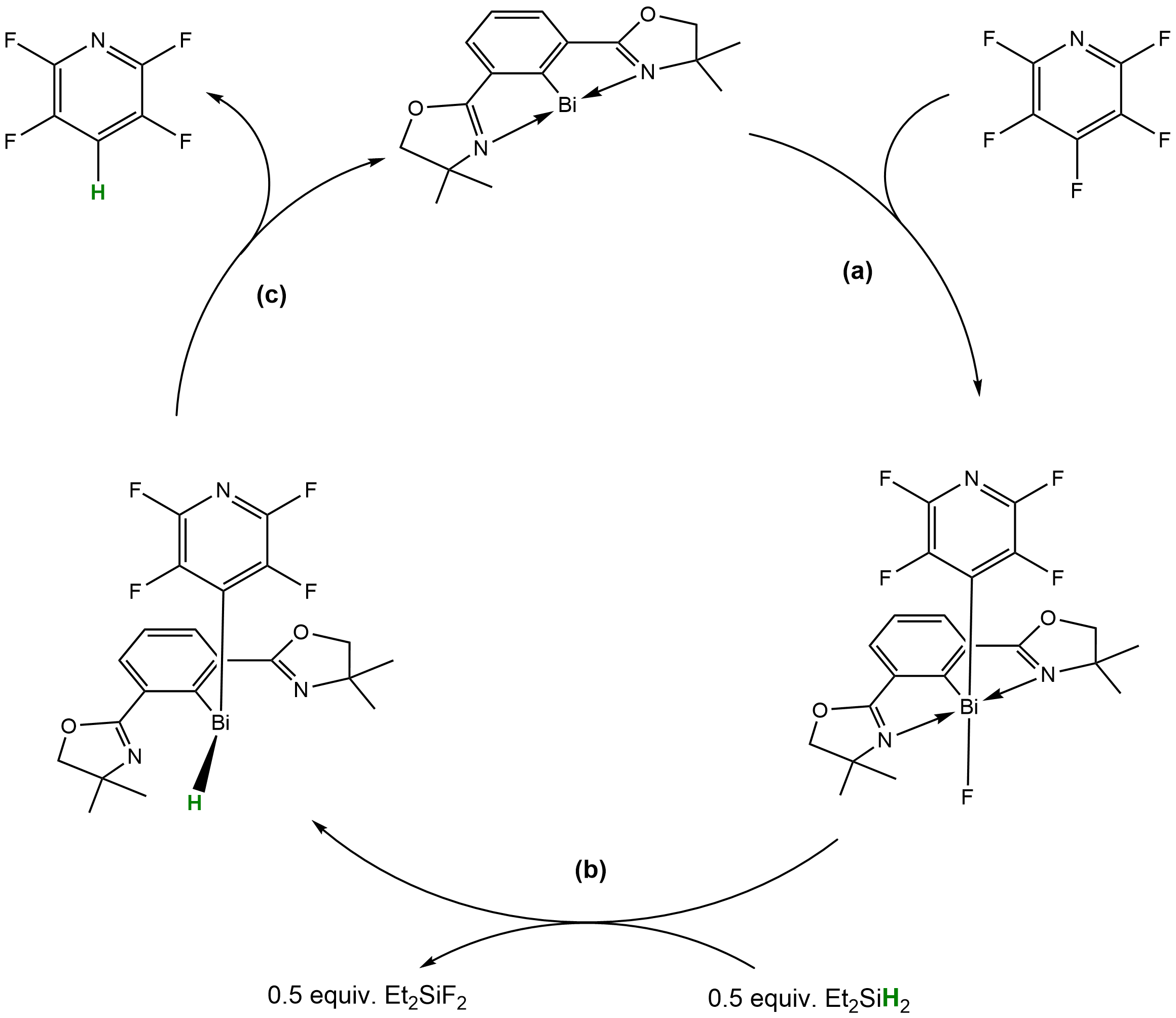
The catalytic cycle for the hydrodefluorination of polyfluoroarenes via Phebox-Bi(I) involves C-F oxidative addition (a), Bi(III)-F to Bi(III)-H ligand metathesis (b), and C-H reductive elimination (c).

A bismuthinidene stabilized by a 2,6-bis(oxazolinyl)phenyl (Phebox) pincer ligand undergoes oxidative addition of aryl fluorides. The resulting Phebox-Bi(III)(fluoroaryl) fluoride react with diethylsilane giving hydrodefluorinated product.

Dostál's bismuthinidene is an electrocatalyst for the formation of hydrogen gas from acetic acid.

==== Oxidative addition toward alkyl halides and diphenyldichalcogenides ====
The low valency of bismuthinidenes renders them reactive toward carbon-polar group bonds. Oxidative addition reactions between Dostál's bismuthinidene and primary C(sp^{3})-X bonds are particularly favorable for X = I or OTf, converting the bismuth(I) center to a bismuth(III) alkyl halide or alkyl triflate. This is true even for longer fluorinated alkyl halides up to six carbon atoms in length. Steric hindrance prevents the activation of tert-butyl iodide by Dostál's bismuthinidene, although a metastable analog with amine pincer arms rather than imine pincer arms (Ar'Bi, where Ar' = 2,6-C_{6}H_{3}(CH_{2}NMe_{2})_{2}) does participate in oxidative addition even with bulky tertiary C-X bonds, likely because the increased rotational mobility of the amine arms allows them to rotate away from the incoming bulky alkyl group in the transition state.

This metastable Ar'Bi, as well as N,C-stabilized bismuthinidene, are also reactive toward diphenyldichalcogenides. While the former yields stable crystals of Ar'Bi(III)(EPh)_{2} (E = S, Se, Te) upon reaction with PhEEPh, the latter yields [2-C_{6}H_{4}(CH=NC_{6}H_{3}(i-Pr)_{2}-2,6)]_{2}Bi(III)(EPh) with two N,C ligands and only one phenyl chalcogenolate. The N,C,N- and doubly N,C-coordinated bismuth(III) phenyl tellurolates are particularly unstable and decompose to form a mixture of products. Oxidative additions of N,C,N-coordinated bismuthinidene to diaryldisulfides are tolerant to a variety of aryl functional groups, including pyridyl, thiazolyl, thienyl, and aminophenyl groups.

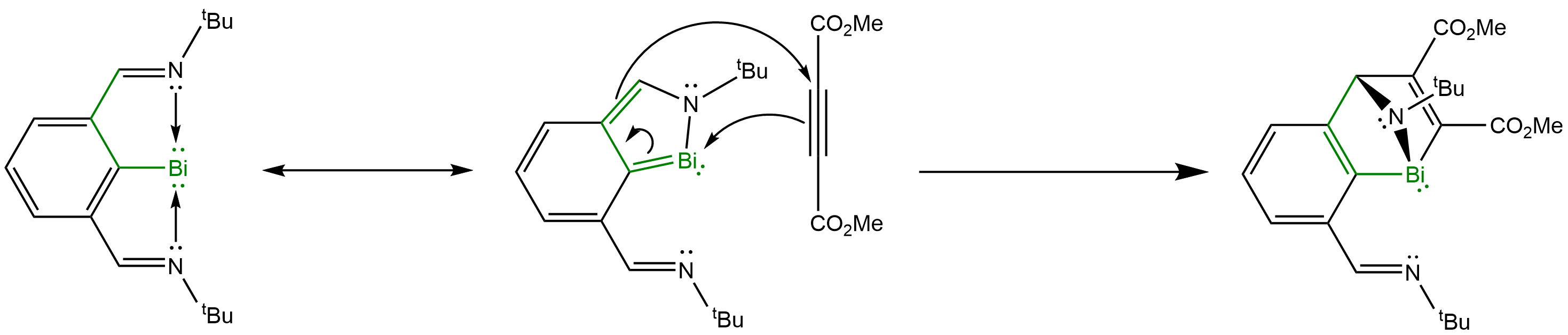
Mechanism for the Diels-Alder reaction between Dostál's bismuthinidene and DMAD, with the diene region of the bismuthinidene highlighted in green. Note that the trivalent Bi-centered resonance structure contributes little to the overall structure and merely illustrates the hidden diene character of the compound.

Dostál's bismuthinidene undergoes [4+2] cycloaddition with the electrophilic alkyne dimethyl acetylenedicarboxylate (DMAD), performing a hetero Diels-Alder [4+2] cycloaddition reaction to yield a bismacyclohexadiene, with the bismuth(III) atom.

=== Transition metal chemistry ===
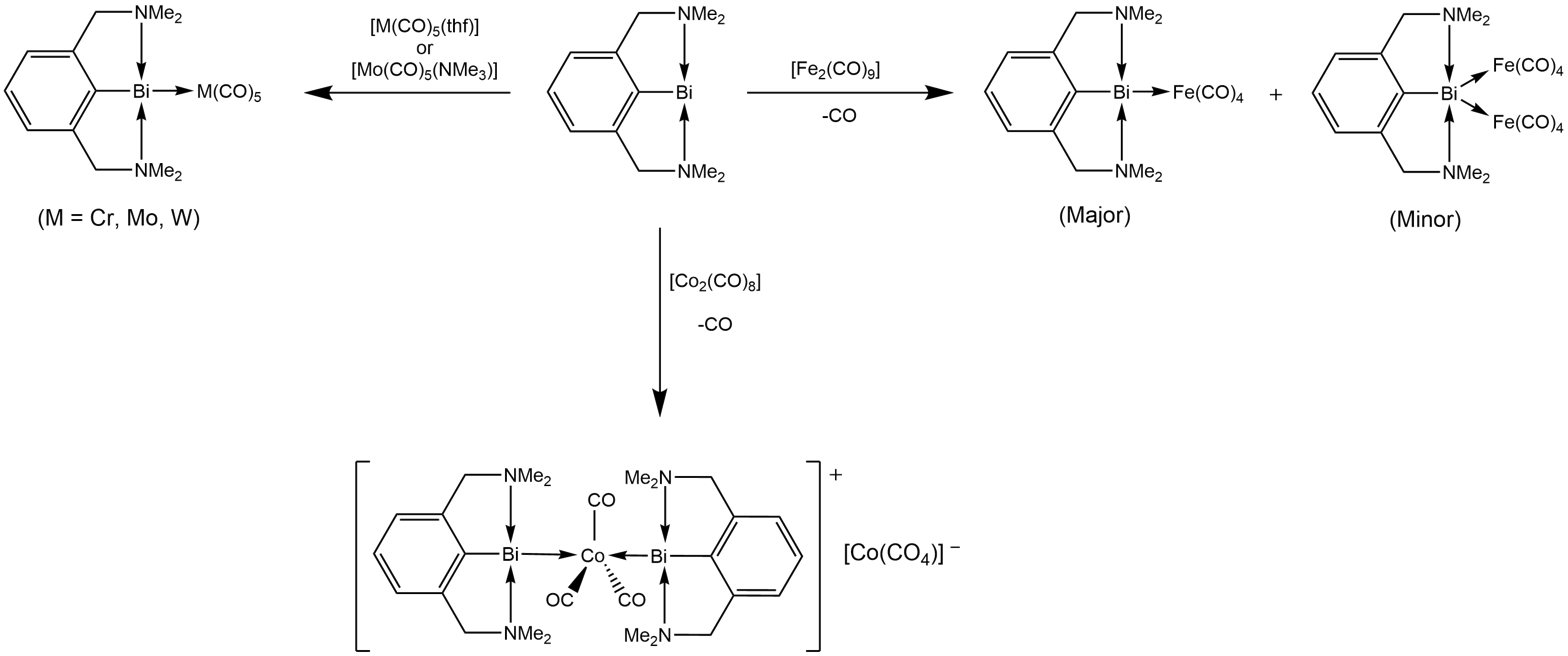
Reactions between Ar'Bi and various electron-deficient transition metal complexes.

Although N,C,N-coordinated bismuthinidenes are stable without transition metal coordination, they are reactive toward certain electron-deficient transition metal complexes and act as L-type donor ligands. Upon addition of Dostál's bismuthinidene (ArBi; Ar = C_{6}H_{3}-2,6-(CH=NtBu)_{2}) to solutions of dicobalt octacarbonyl or dimanganese decacarbonyl in toluene, isolable ionic crystals of [(ArBi)_{2}Co(CO)_{3}]^{+}[Co(CO)_{4}]^{−} or [(ArBi)_{2}Mn(CO)_{4}]^{+}[Mn(CO)_{5}]^{−} begin to form. These complexes show significant covalent interaction between the bismuth(I) atoms and the cobalt or manganese centers, though these bismuth-metal bonds are dative in character. Because the bismuth-metal bonding consists almost entirely of σ-donation of the electrons in the p-type lone pair on bismuth into the d_{z^{2}} orbital of the transition metal center, the ArBi units bond to the metal center in a side-on manner with C-Bi-Co or C-Bi-Mn bond angles close to 90°, such that the planes of the N,C,N ligands and those of the trigonal planar Co(CO)_{3} or square planar Mn(CO)_{4} moieties are all nearly parallel with each other. In this binding mode, the aromatic rings on the N,C,N ligands adopt a syn configuration stabilized by weak CH···CH and CH···O interactions.

Dostál's bismuthinidene also binds to gold(I) centers stabilized by the N-heterocyclic carbene ligand IPr (1,3-bis(2,6-diisopropylphenyl)imidazolin-2-ylidene). Ligand exchange with [Au(IPr)(ACN)]^{+}[BF_{4}]^{−} yields the complex [Au(IPr)(ArBi)]^{+}[BF_{4}]^{−} as a white powder. Though this complex is stabilized by the dative donation of electrons from Bi(I) into the empty 6s orbital of Au(I), this Bi(I) → Au(I) interaction is nevertheless stronger than any previously discovered Bi(III) → Au(I) interactions in which the bismuth atom acts as a donor. Furthermore, it represents the first stable, isolable complex containing Bi(I) → Au(I) interaction, which is thought to be enabled by the N,C,N-pincer ligand backbone.

Similar reactivities have also been observed for the metastable version of Dostál's bismuthinidene containing amine pincer arms rather than imine pincer arms (Ar’Bi; Ar’ = C_{6}H_{3}-2,6-(CH_{2}NMe_{2})_{2}). Addition of this metastable bismuthinidene to THF solutions of M(CO)_{5} (where M = Cr, Mo, W) yields isolable crystals of [Ar’BiM(CO)_{5}]. As before, the Ar’-Bi unit binds to the M(CO)_{5} moiety in a side-on fashion, with σ-donation from Bi(I) into the metal d_{z^{2}} orbital. The reaction between Ar’-Bi and diiron nonacarbonyl likewise yields mostly [Ar’BiFe(CO)_{5}], along with a small amount of [Ar’Bi(Fe(CO)_{4})_{2}] as a minor product. In fact, the reactivities of Dostál's bismuthinidene ArBi and its metastable analog Ar’-Bi toward transition metals are so similar that, upon reaction with Co_{2}(CO)_{8}, they form the analogous complexes [(ArBi)_{2}Co(CO)_{3}]^{+}[Co(CO)_{4}]^{−} and [(Ar’Bi)_{2}Co(CO)_{3}]^{+}[Co(CO)_{4}]^{−}, respectively, with similar binding modes, bond lengths, and bond angles.
