= Allen–Millar–Trippett rearrangement =

Organic chemistry process

The Allen–Millar–Trippett rearrangement is a ring expansion reaction in which a cyclic phosphine is transformed into a cyclic phosphine oxide. This name reaction, first reported in the 1960s by David W. Allen, Ian T. Millar, and Stuart Trippett, occurs by alkylation or acylation of the phosphorus, followed by reaction with hydroxide to give a rearranged product. The hydroxide first attacks the phosphonium atom, followed by collapse to the phosphine oxide with one of the groups migrating off of the phosphorus.

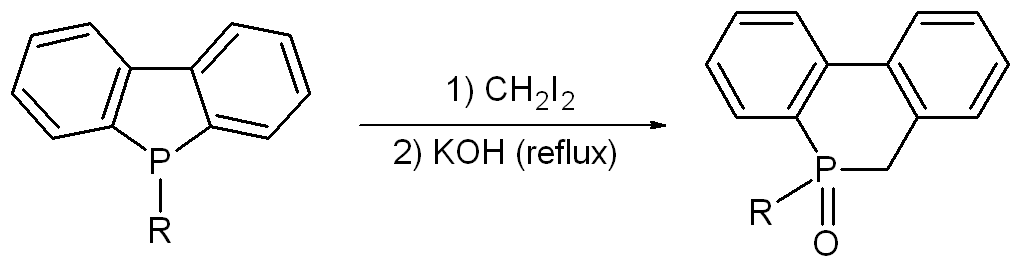
