= Nontrigonal pnictogen compounds =

Class of chemical compounds

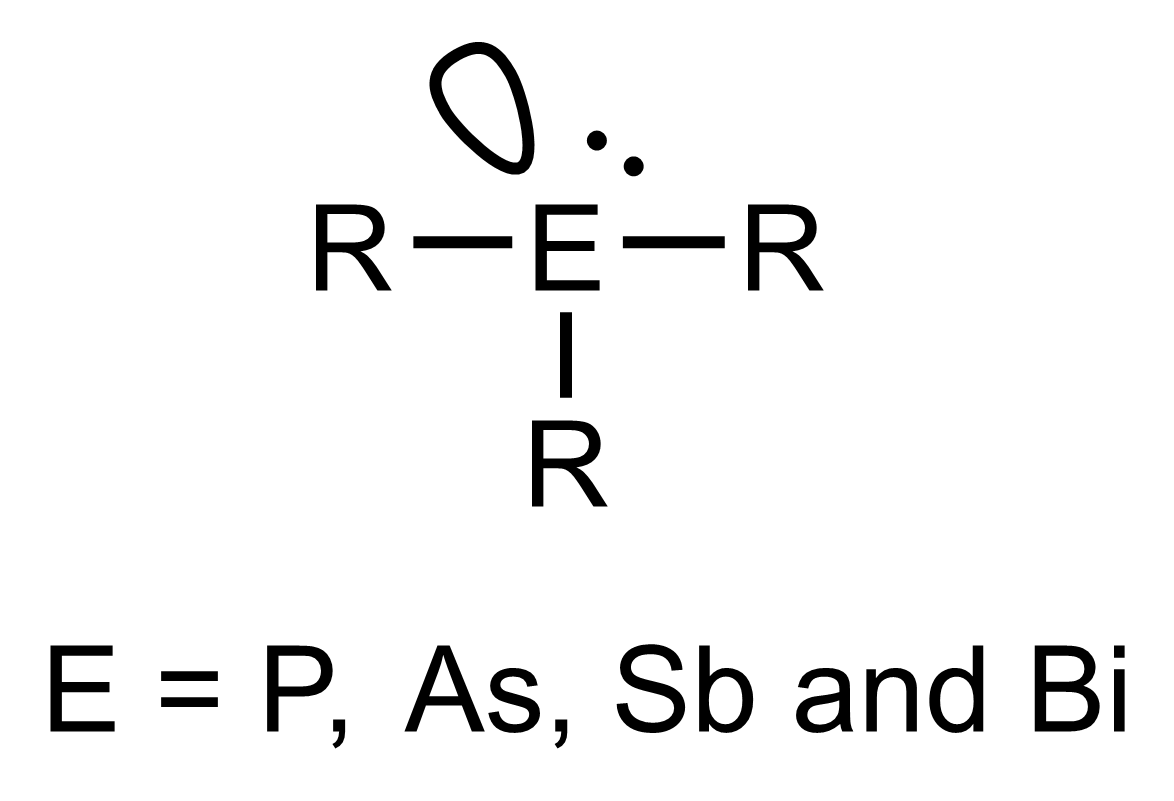
General structure of nontrigonal pnictogen compounds

In chemistry, nontrigonal pnictogen compounds refer to tricoordinate trivalent pnictogen (phosphorus, arsenic, antimony and bismuth: P, As, Sb and Bi) compounds that are not of typical trigonal pyramidal molecular geometry. By virtue of their geometric constraint, these compounds exhibit distinct electronic structures and reactivities, which bestow on them potential to provide unique nonmetal platforms for bond cleavage reactions.

== Synthesis ==
The first examples of nontrigonal pnictogen compound were synthesized by Arduengo and co-workers in 1984, through condensation of a diketoamine with a phosphorus trihalide in the presence of base. This group reported also on the first systematic investigations into its chemical behavior. Later, on similar routes, the corresponding and isostructural arsenic and antimony species were also synthesized. Other synthetic methods involve deprotonation of OH or NH groups in the presence of ECl_{3} (E=P, As, Sb and Bi), salt metathesis or reduction of pentavalent pnictogen compounds.

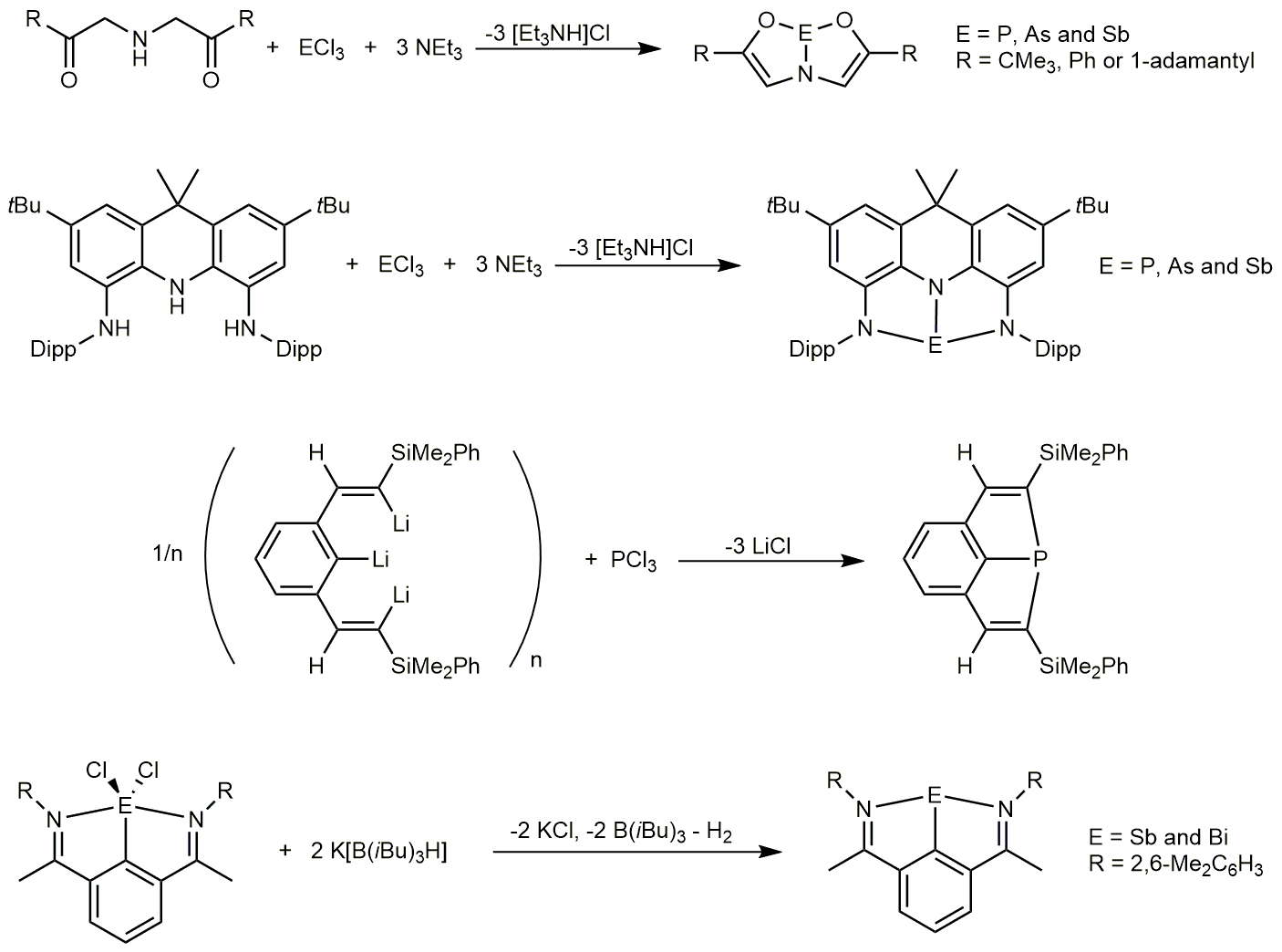
Synthetic scheme of notrigonal pnictogen compounds

== Structures and properties ==
The molecular structures of nontrigonal pnictogen compounds reveal the steric strain in these molecules, and significantly differing bond angles at the pnictogen atoms indicate a considerable distortion of the coordination spheres.

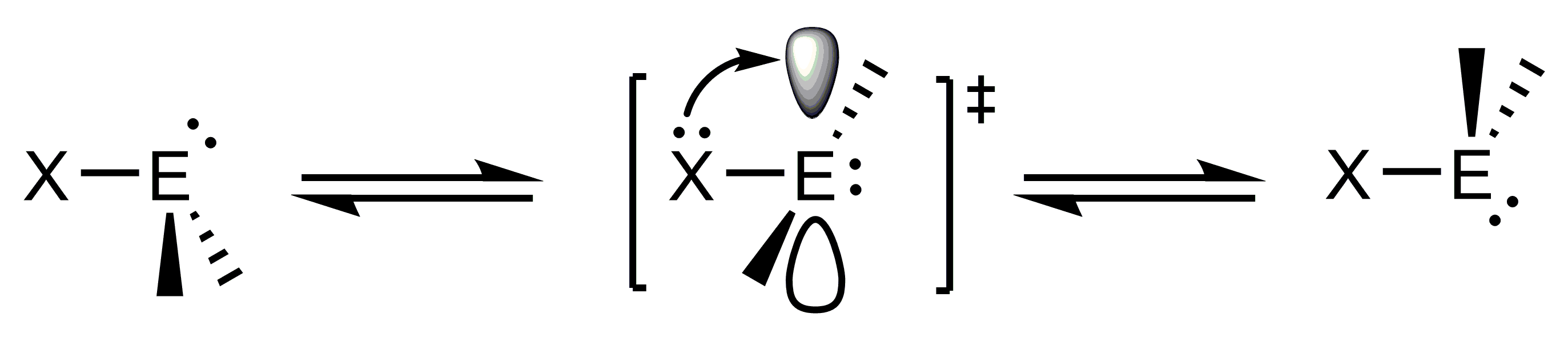
Inversion of the configuration via planar coordinated pnictogen atoms

In particular, the geometry at the central part of these compounds deviate strongly from traditional pnictogen compounds, and indicate molecular strain with an approach to a T-type molecular configuration. With different ligand motifs, the bond angles at pnictogen atoms can vary from 100˚ to almost 180˚. The flattened geometry of these molecules influences the relatively low energetic barriers for inversion of the configuration via planar coordinated pnictogen atoms in the transition state. These low barriers are in accordance with the dynamic behavior and fast equilibration processes observed in ambient temperature NMR.

Results of quantum chemical calculations confirm that in these compounds, the lone pair of electrons at the pnictogen atoms is localized in orbitals with relatively high s-character. From these results, only weak nucleophilicity was derived in accordance with some experimental observations such as the inertness towards benzyl bromide. The LUMO is delocalized but has important contributions from pnictogen empty p orbitals, which should favor a nucleophilic attack of substrates at this position in accordance with experimental findings. The pnictogen atom forms a three-center-four-electron bond with the two flanking nitrogen atoms, which is manifested by the HOMO-2.

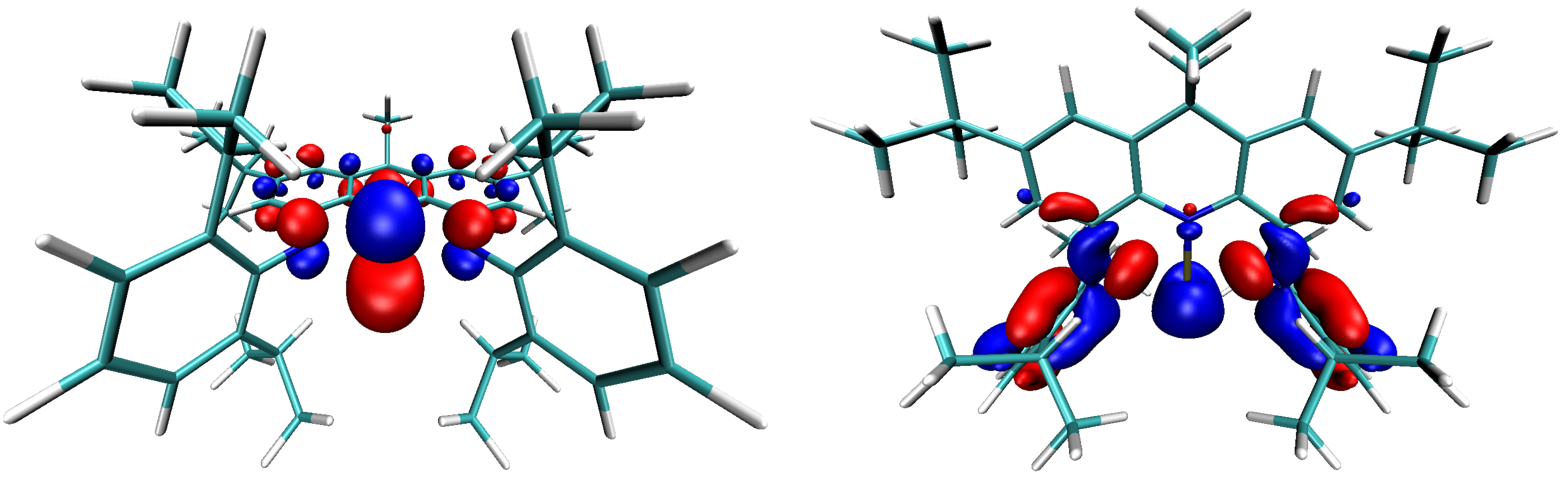
Left: LUMO of a nontrigonal phosphorus compound, which consists mainly of the empty p orbital; Right: HOMO-2 of a nontrigonal phosphorus compound, which manifests the three-center-four-electron bond

For nontrigonal bismuth compounds, a Bi(I) electronic structure could be shown to be most appropriate. Natural bond orbital (NBO) analysis reveals an s-type lone pair and a p-type lone pair at the metal, with the remaining two p orbitals being involved in one two-center-two-electron bond and one three-center-two-electron bond. The p-type lone pair NBO has less than 2 electron occupancy as it is delocalized over the ligand frame. Although considerable Bi(I) character is indicated for the Bi compound, it exhibits reactivity similar to Bi(III) electrophiles, and expresses either a vacant or a filled p orbital at Bi.

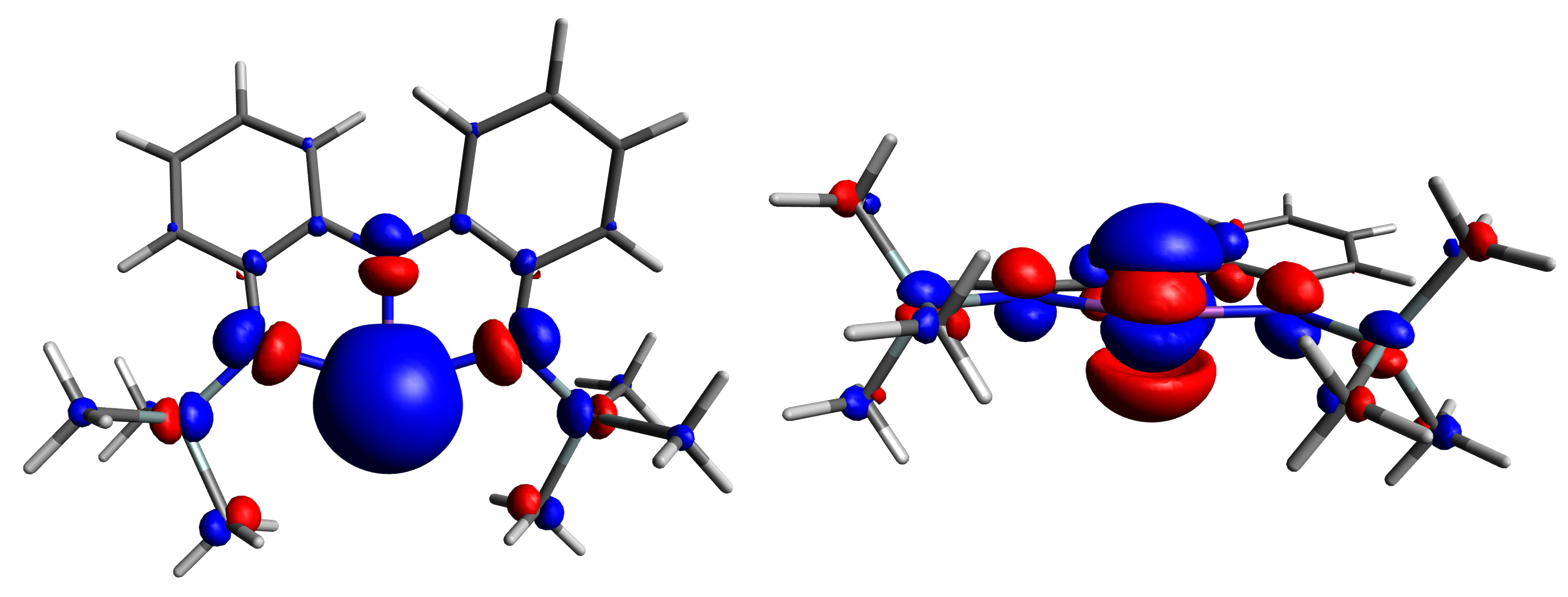
Left: filled s-type lone pair NBO at Bi of a nontrigonal bismuth compound; Right: partially filled p-type lone pair NBO at Bi of a nontrigonal bismuth compound

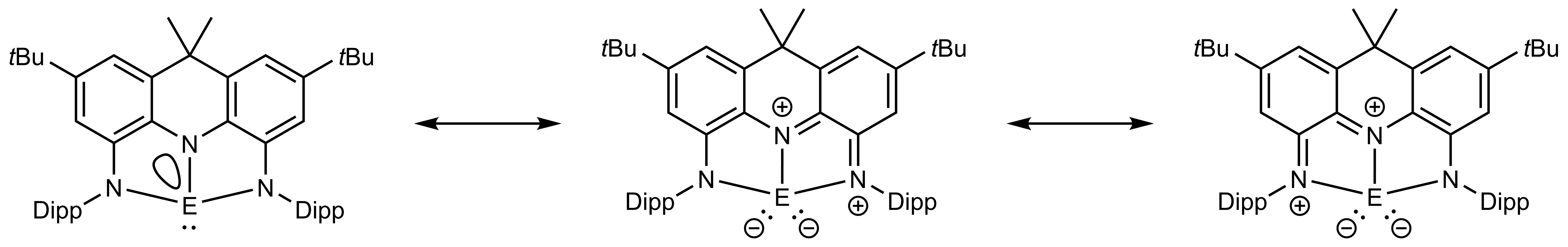
Resonance structures of nontrigonal pnictogen compounds

From these results, two types of resonance structures can be drawn, one with a filled s-orbital and a vacant p orbital at the pnictogen center, the other one with negative charge on pnictogen, arising from the redox-non-innocent nature of the ligand. This is evident by shorter C-N bond lengths in nontrigonal pnictogen compounds than C-N single bonds in the corresponding ligands. These structures may reflect the specific bonding situation in these strained molecular systems.

== Reactivity ==
These easily available and sterically constrained compounds are potentially suitable for an application in a wide variety of secondary processes such as small molecule activation or the generation of new catalysts based on main-group and transition-metal elements.

=== Redox reactions ===
Since the LUMOs of nontrigonal pnictogen compounds consist mainly of the vacant p orbitals of the pnictogen nuclei, they could undergo one-electron reduction to afford radical anions if the energy levels of LUMOs are appropriate. For a less sterically hindered compound, the generated radical anion readily dimerizes to form a dianion with a P-P bond. When a sterically encumbered tris-amide ligand is used, stable radical anions bearing T-shaped pnictogen nuclei can be isolated and characterized.

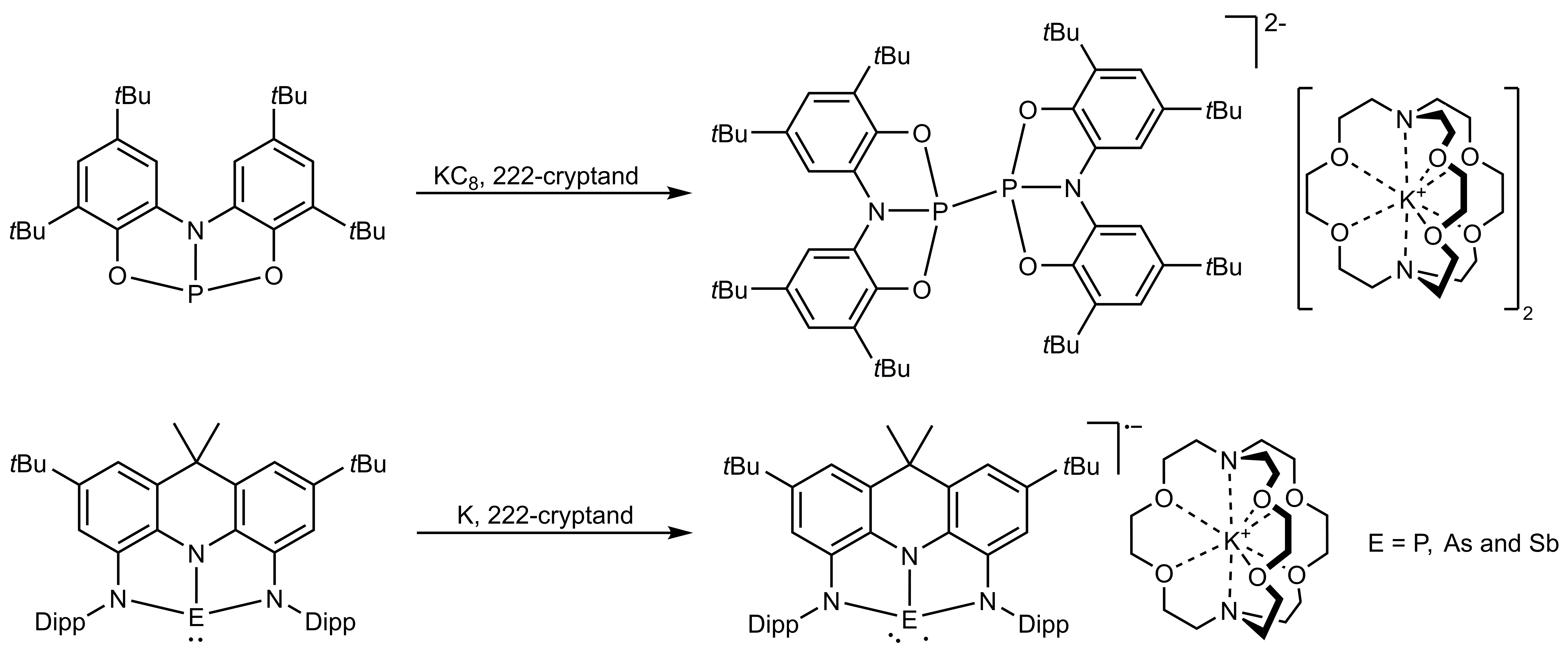
Reduction of nontrigonal pnictogen compounds

The oxidation of nontrigonal phosphorus compounds and transfer of halogen molecules to the phosphorus atoms to generate phosphoranes with phosphorus atoms in an oxidation state of +5 was achieved by various synthetic procedures. These dihalides are promising starting materials and potentially applicable for the generation of numerous secondary products, but only few reactions have been reported so far in the literature. Nontrigonal phosphorus compounds can also be oxidized by organic azide to yield phosphazenes.

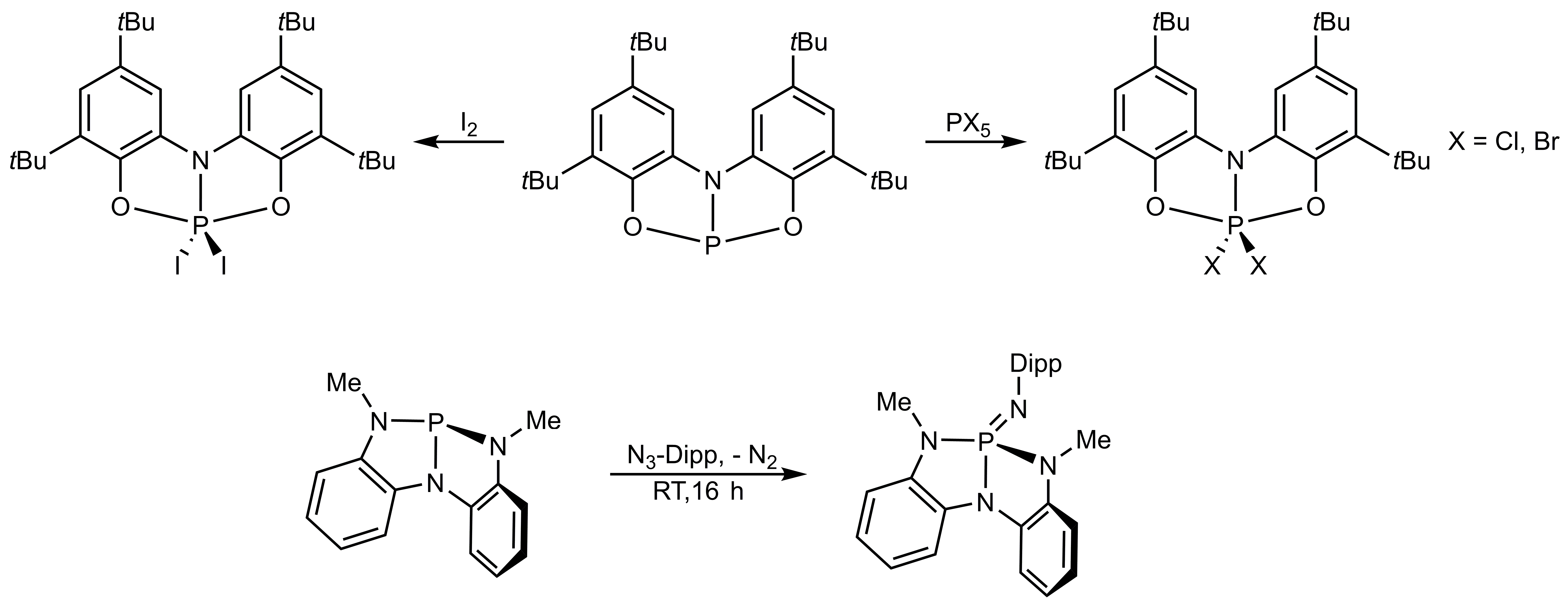
Oxidation of nontrigonal pnictogen compounds

=== Oxidative addition ===
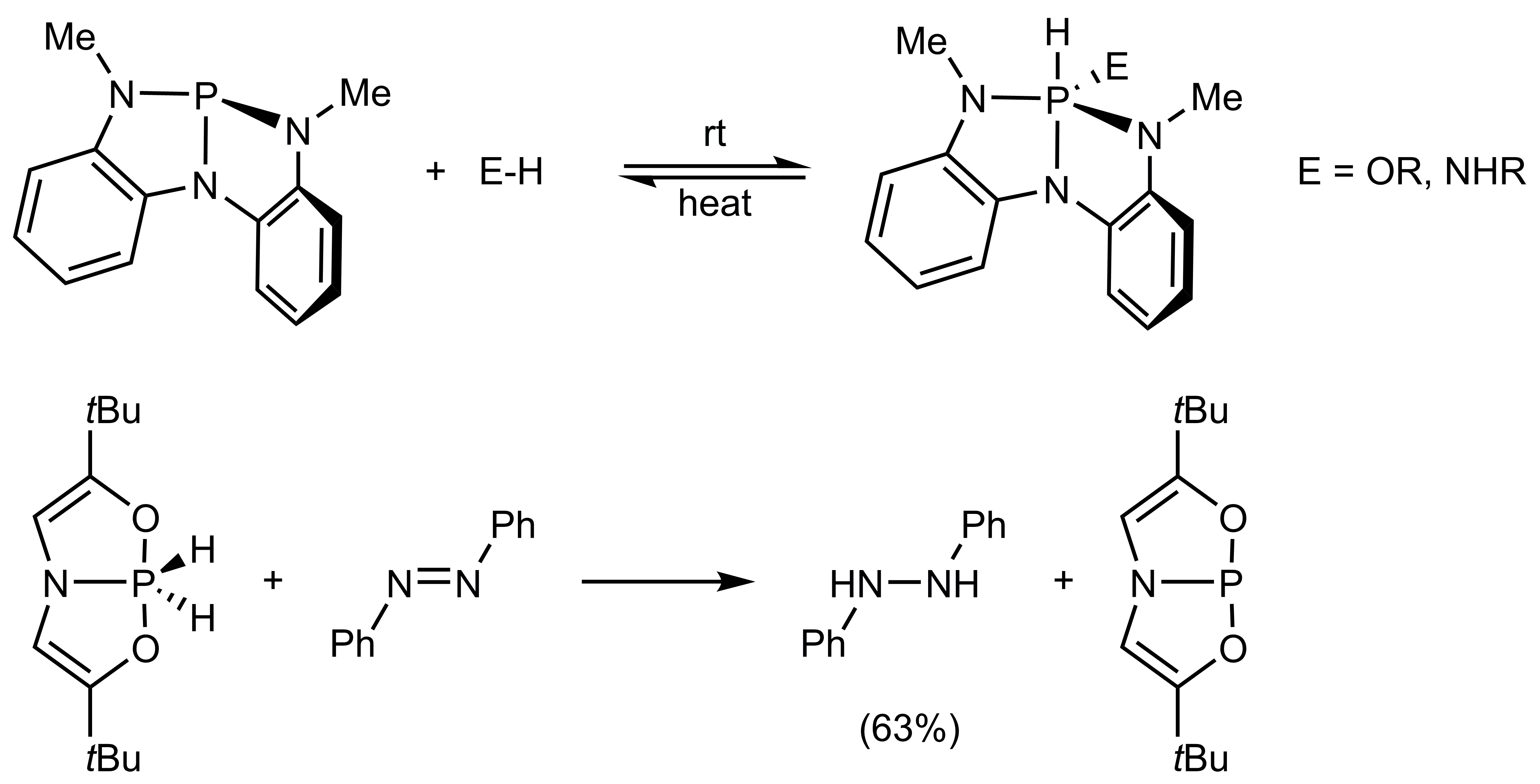
Oxidative addition of nontrigonal phosphorus compounds

These sterically constrained phosphorus compounds show remarkable reactivity towards protic reagents such as primary amines and alcohols, which results in intermolecular oxidative addition of these O−H and N−H bonds. This reaction tolerates a variety of different substrates, including ammonia and water. Two mechanisms have been suggested for the understanding of the unusual insertion of phosphorus atoms into polar X−H bonds by oxidative addition.

Nontrigonal phosphorus compounds can also react with ammonia–borane to form a formal dihydrogen oxidative addition product. This compound proved to facilitate the catalytic reduction of azobenzene.

=== Coordination chemistry ===
The first transition metal complexes of nontrigonal pnictogen compounds have been reported in the 1980s and '90s. Up to now, several complexes have been successfully synthesized, but they have not yet been applied in secondary processes, such as catalytic cycles.

In 2018, the synthesis and reactivity of a chelating ligand containing a nontrigonal phosphorus center was reported. It is worth noting that, apart from direct metalation of this ligand with RuCl_{2}(PPh_{3})_{3}, metalation with a ruthenium hydride compound RuHCl(CO)(PPh_{3})_{3} yields a complex with net insertion into the Ru−H bond. These ligands, along with recent developments for higher valent states of Sb ligands, may possess rich potential in the field of catalysis and sensing.

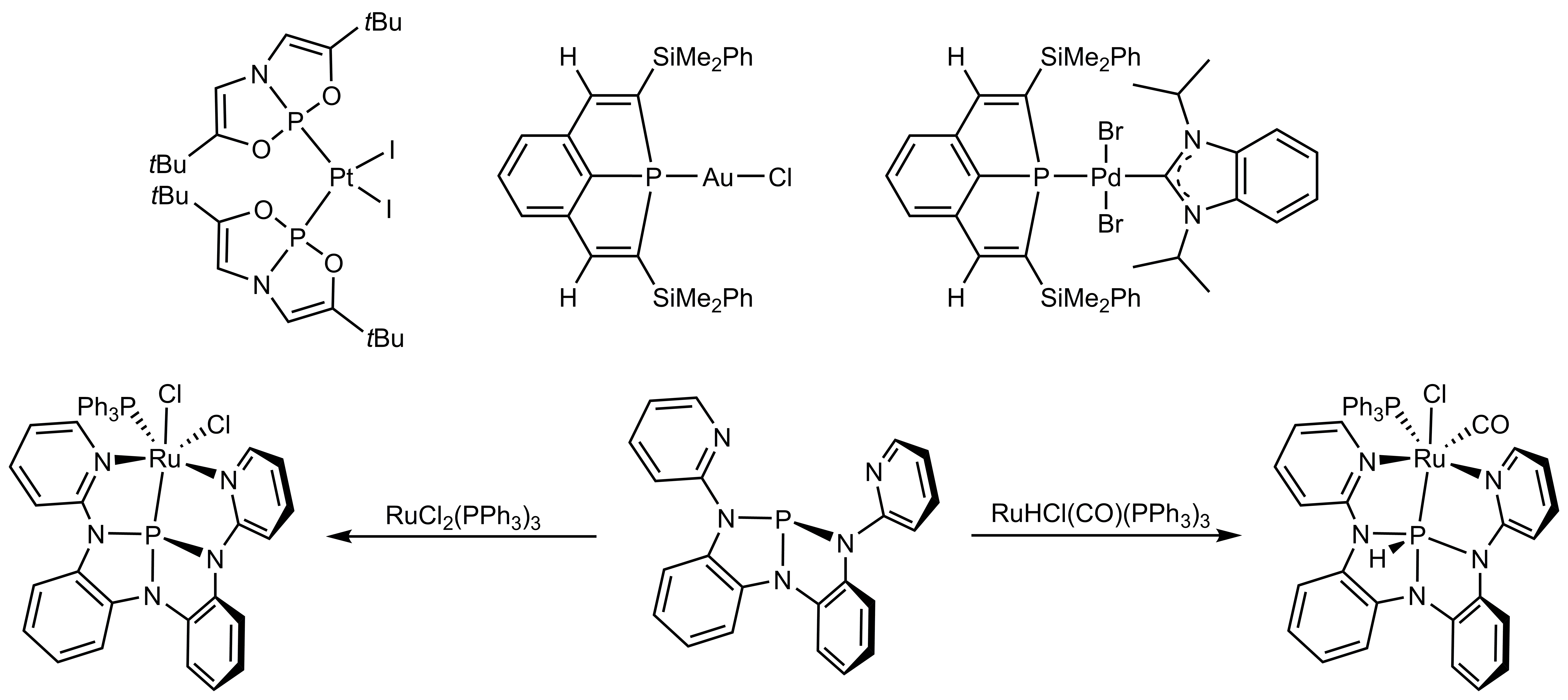
Coordination chemistry of nontrigonal phosphorus compounds

== See also ==
- Phosphine
- Organophosphorus compound
- Organoarsenic chemistry
- Organoantimony chemistry
- Organobismuth chemistry
