= IUPAC nomenclature of organic chemistry =

System for naming organic chemical compounds

In chemical nomenclature, the IUPAC nomenclature of organic chemistry is a method of naming organic chemical compounds as recommended by the International Union of Pure and Applied Chemistry (IUPAC). It is published in the Nomenclature of Organic Chemistry (informally called the Blue Book) and summarized in a IUPAC technical report. Ideally, every possible organic compound should have a name from which an unambiguous structural formula can be created. There is also an IUPAC nomenclature of inorganic chemistry.

To avoid long and tedious names in normal communication, the official IUPAC naming recommendations are not always followed in practice, except when it is necessary to give an unambiguous and absolute definition to a compound. IUPAC names can sometimes be simpler than older names, as with ethanol, instead of ethyl alcohol. For relatively simple molecules, they can be more easily understood than non-systematic names, which must be learnt or looked over. However, the common or trivial name is often substantially shorter and clearer, and so preferred. These non-systematic names are often derived from an original source of the compound. Also, very long names may be less clear than structural formulas.

== Basic principles ==
In chemistry, a number of prefixes, suffixes and infixes are used to describe the type and position of the functional groups in the compound.

The steps for naming an organic compound are:

1. Identification of the most senior group. If more than one functional group, if any, is present, the one with highest group precedence should be used.
2. Identification of the ring or chain with the maximum number of senior groups.
3. Identification of the ring or chain with the most senior elements (In order: N, P, Si, B, O, S, C).
4. Identification of the parent compound. Rings are senior to chains if composed of the same elements.
  1. For cyclic systems: Identification of the parent cyclic ring. The cyclic system must obey these rules, in order of precedence:
    1. It should have the most senior heteroatom (in order: N, O, S, P, Si, B).
    2. It should have the maximum number of rings.
    3. It should have the maximum number of atoms.
    4. It should have the maximum number of heteroatoms.
    5. It should have the maximum number of senior heteroatoms (in order: O, S, N, P, Si, B).
  2. For chains: Identification of the parent hydrocarbon chain. This chain must obey the following rules, in order of precedence:
    1. It should have the maximum length.
    2. It should have the maximum number of heteroatoms.
    3. It should have the maximum number of senior heteroatoms (in order: O, S, N, P, Si, B).
  3. For cyclic systems and chains after previous rules:
    1. It should have the maximum number of multiple, then double bonds.
    2. It should have the maximum number of substituents of the suffix functional group. By suffix, it is meant that the parent functional group should have a suffix, unlike halogen substituents. If more than one functional group is present, the one with highest group precedence should be used.
5. Identification of the side-chains. Side chains are the carbon chains that are not in the parent chain, but are branched off from it.
6. Identification of the remaining functional groups, if any, and naming them by their ionic prefixes (such as hydroxy for −OH, oxy for =O, oxyalkane for O−R, etc.).
  Different side-chains and functional groups will be grouped together in alphabetical order. (The multiplier prefixes di-, tri-, etc. are not taken into consideration for grouping alphabetically. For example, ethyl comes before dihydroxy or dimethyl, as the "e" in "ethyl" precedes the "h" in "dihydroxy" and the "m" in "dimethyl" alphabetically. The "di" is not considered in either case). When both side chains and secondary functional groups are present, they should be written mixed together in one group rather than in two separate groups.
7. Identification of double/triple bonds.
8. Numbering of the chain. This is done by first numbering the chain in both directions (left to right and right to left), and then choosing the numbering which follows these rules, in order of precedence. Not every rule will apply to every compound, rules can be skipped if they do not apply.
  1. Has the lowest-numbered locant (or locants) for heteroatoms. Locants are the numbers on the carbons to which the substituent is directly attached.
  2. Has the lowest-numbered locants for the indicated hydrogen. The indicated hydrogen is for some unsaturated heterocyclic compounds. It refers to the hydrogen atoms not attached to atoms with double bonds in the ring system.
  3. Has the lowest-numbered locants for the suffix functional group.
  4. Has the lowest-numbered locants for multiple bonds ('ene', 'yne'), and hydro prefixes. (The locant of a multiple bond is the number of the adjacent carbon with a lower number).
  5. Has the lowest-numbered locants for all substituents cited by prefixes.
  6. Has the lowest-numbered locants for substituents in order of citation (for example: in a cyclic ring with only bromine and chlorine functional groups, alphabetically bromo- is cited before chloro- and would receive the lower locant).
9. Numbering of the various substituents and bonds with their locants. If there is more than one of the same type of substituent/double bond, a prefix is added showing how many there are (di – 2, tri – 3, tetra – 4, then as for the number of carbons below with 'a' added at the end)

The numbers for that type of side chain will be grouped in ascending order and written before the name of the side-chain. If there are two side-chains with the same alpha carbon, the number will be written twice. Example: 2,2,3-trimethyl- . If there are both double bonds and triple bonds, "en" (double bond) is written before "yne" (triple bond). When the main functional group is a terminal functional group (a group which can exist only at the end of a chain, like formyl and carboxyl groups), there is no need to number it.

1. Arrangement in this form: Group of side chains and secondary functional groups with numbers made in step 6 + prefix of parent hydrocarbon chain (eth, meth) + double/triple bonds with numbers (or "ane") + primary functional group suffix with numbers.
  Wherever it says "with numbers", it is understood that between the word and the numbers, the prefix (di-, tri-) is used.
2. Adding of punctuation:
  1. Commas are put between numbers (2 5 5 becomes 2,5,5)
  2. Hyphens are put between a number and a letter (2 5 5 trimethylheptane becomes 2,5,5-trimethylheptane)
  3. Successive words are merged into one word (trimethyl heptane becomes trimethylheptane)
    Note: IUPAC uses one-word names throughout. This is why all parts are connected.

The resulting name appears as:

#,#-di<side chain>-#-<secondary functional group>-#-<side chain>-#,#,#-tri<secondary functional group><parent chain prefix><If all bonds are single bonds, use "ane">-#,#-di<double bonds>-#-<triple bonds>-#-<primary functional group>

where each "#" represents a number. The group secondary functional groups and side chains may not look the same as shown here, as the side chains and secondary functional groups are arranged alphabetically. The di- and tri- have been used just to show their usage. (di- after #,#, tri- after #,#,#, etc.)

=== Example ===
Here is a sample molecule with the parent carbons numbered:

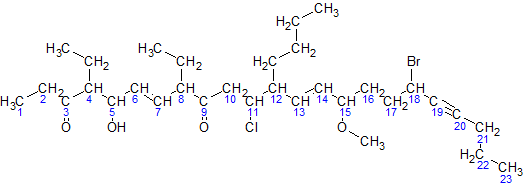

For simplicity, here is an image of the same molecule, where the hydrogens in the parent chain are removed and the carbons are shown by their numbers:

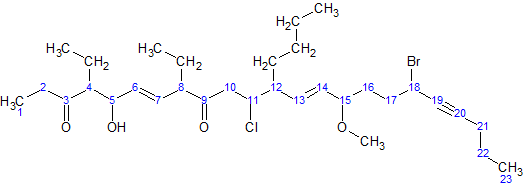

Now, following the above steps:

1. The parent hydrocarbon chain has 23 carbons. It is called tricosa-.
2. The functional groups with the highest precedence are the two ketone groups.
  1. The groups are on carbon atoms 3 and 9. As there are two, we write 3,9-dione.
  2. The numbering of the molecule is based on the ketone groups. When numbering from left to right, the ketone groups are numbered 3 and 9. When numbering from right to left, the ketone groups are numbered 15 and 21. 3 is less than 15, therefore the ketones are numbered 3 and 9. The smaller number is always used, not the sum of the constituents numbers.
3. The side chains are: an ethyl- at carbon 4, an ethyl- at carbon 8, and a butyl- at carbon 12.
  Note: the −O−CH_{3} at carbon atom 15 is not a side chain, but it is a methoxy functional group.
  - There are two ethyl- groups. They are combined to create, 4,8-diethyl.
  - The side chains are grouped like this: 12-butyl-4,8-diethyl. (But this is not necessarily the final grouping, as functional groups may be added in between to ensure all groups are listed alphabetically.)
4. The secondary functional groups are: a hydroxy- at carbon 5, a chloro- at carbon 11, a methoxy- at carbon 15, and a bromo- at carbon 18. Grouped with the side chains, this gives 18-bromo-12-butyl-11-chloro-4,8-diethyl-5-hydroxy-15-methoxy.
5. There are two double bonds: one between carbons 6 and 7, and one between carbons 13 and 14. They would be called "6,13-diene", but the presence of alkynes switches it to 6,13-dien. There is one triple bond between carbon atoms 19 and 20. It will be called 19-yne.
6. The arrangement (with punctuation) is: 18-bromo-12-butyl-11-chloro-4,8-diethyl-5-hydroxy-15-methoxytricosa-6,13-dien-19-yne-3,9-dione
7. Finally, due to cis–trans isomerism, we have to specify the relative orientation of functional groups around each double bond. For this example, both double bonds are trans isomers, so we have (6E,13E)

The final name is (6E,13E)-18-bromo-12-butyl-11-chloro-4,8-diethyl-5-hydroxy-15-methoxytricosa-6,13-dien-19-yne-3,9-dione.

== Hydrocarbons ==
=== Alkanes ===
Straight-chain alkanes take the suffix "-ane" and are prefixed depending on the number of carbon atoms in the chain, following standard rules. The first few are:

Number of carbons	1	2	3	4	5	6	7	8	9	10	11	12	13	14	15	16	17	18	19	20
Prefix	Meth	Eth	Prop	But	Pent	Hex	Hept	Oct	Non	Dec	Undec	Dodec	Tridec	Tetradec	Pentadec	Hexadec	Heptadec	Octadec	Nonadec	Icos

For example, the simplest alkane is CH_{4} methane, and the nine-carbon alkane CH_{3}(CH_{2})_{7}CH_{3} is named nonane. The names of the first four alkanes were derived from methanol, ether, propionic acid and butyric acid, respectively. The rest are named with a Greek numeric prefix, with the exceptions of nonane, which has a Latin prefix, and undecane, which has mixed-language prefixes.

Cyclic alkanes are simply prefixed with "cyclo-": for example, C_{4}H_{8} is cyclobutane (not to be confused with butene) and C_{6}H_{12} is cyclohexane (not to be confused with hexene).

Branched alkanes are named as a straight-chain alkane with attached alkyl groups. They are prefixed with a number indicating the carbon the group is attached to, counting from the end of the alkane chain. For example, (CH_{3})_{2}CHCH_{3}, commonly known as isobutane, is treated as a propane chain with a methyl group bonded to the middle (2) carbon, and given the systematic name 2-methylpropane. However, although the name 2-methylpropane could be used, it is easier and more logical to call it simply methylpropane – the methyl group could not possibly occur on any of the other carbon atoms (that would lengthen the chain and result in butane, not propane) and therefore the use of the number "2" is unnecessary.

If there is ambiguity in the position of the substituent, depending on which end of the alkane chain is counted as "1", then numbering is chosen so that the smaller number is used. For example, (CH_{3})_{2}CHCH_{2}CH_{3} (isopentane) is named 2-methylbutane, not 3-methylbutane.

If there are multiple side-branches of the same size alkyl group, their positions are separated by commas and the group prefixed with multiplier prefixes depending on the number of branches. For example, C(CH_{3})_{4} (neopentane) is named 2,2-dimethylpropane. If there are different groups, they are added in alphabetical order, separated by commas or hyphens. The longest possible main alkane chain is used; therefore 3-ethyl-4-methylhexane instead of 2,3-diethylpentane, even though these describe equivalent structures. The di-, tri- etc. prefixes are ignored for the purpose of alphabetical ordering of side chains (e.g. 3-ethyl-2,4-dimethylpentane, not 2,4-dimethyl-3-ethylpentane).

=== Alkenes ===

Alkenes are named for their parent alkane chain with the suffix "-ene" and a numerical root indicating the position of the carbon with the lower number for each double bond in the chain: CH_{2}=CHCH_{2}CH_{3} is but-1-ene. Multiple double bonds take the form -diene, -triene, etc., with the size prefix of the chain taking an extra "a": CH_{2}=CHCH=CH_{2} is buta-1,3-diene. Simple cis and trans isomers may be indicated with a prefixed cis- or trans-: cis-but-2-ene, trans-but-2-ene. However, cis- and trans- are relative descriptors. It is IUPAC convention to describe all alkenes using absolute descriptors of Z- (same side) and E- (opposite) with the Cahn–Ingold–Prelog priority rules (see also E–Z notation).

=== Alkynes ===

Alkynes are named using the same system as alkenes, with the suffix "-yne" indicating a triple bond: ethyne (acetylene), propyne (methylacetylene).

== Functional groups ==
=== Haloalkanes and haloarenes ===

In haloalkanes and haloarenes (R−X), Halogen functional groups are prefixed with the bonding position and take the form of fluoro-, chloro-, bromo-, iodo-, or astato-, depending on the halogen. Multiple groups are dichloro-, trichloro-, etc., and dissimilar groups are ordered alphabetically as before. For example, CHCl_{3} (chloroform) is trichloromethane. The anesthetic halothane (CF_{3}CHBrCl) is 2-bromo-2-chloro-1,1,1-trifluoroethane.

=== Alcohols ===

Alcohols (R−OH) take the suffix "-ol" with a numerical suffix indicating the bonding position: CH_{3}CH_{2}CH_{2}OH is propan-1-ol. The suffixes -diol, -triol, -tetrol, etc., are used for multiple −OH groups: Ethylene glycol CH_{2}OHCH_{2}OH is ethane-1,2-diol.

If higher precedence functional groups are present (see order of precedence, below), the prefix "hydroxy" is used with the bonding position: CH_{3}CHOHCOOH is 2-hydroxypropanoic acid.

=== Ethers ===

Ethers (R−O−R) consist of an oxygen atom between the two attached carbon chains. The shorter of the two chains becomes the first part of the name with the -ane suffix changed to -oxy, and the longer alkane chain becomes the suffix of the name of the ether. Thus, CH_{3}OCH_{3} is methoxymethane, and CH_{3}OCH_{2}CH_{3} is methoxyethane (not ethoxymethane). If the oxygen is not attached to the end of the main alkane chain, then the whole shorter alkyl-plus-ether group is treated as a side-chain and prefixed with its bonding position on the main chain. Thus CH_{3}OCH(CH_{3})_{2} is 2-methoxypropane.

Alternatively, an ether chain can be named as an alkane in which one carbon is replaced by an oxygen, a replacement denoted by the prefix "oxa". For example, CH_{3}OCH_{2}CH_{3} could also be called 2-oxabutane, and an epoxide could be called oxacyclopropane. This method is especially useful when both groups attached to the oxygen atom are complex.

=== Aldehydes ===

Aldehydes (R−CH=O) take the suffix "-al". If other functional groups are present, the chain is numbered such that the aldehyde carbon is in the "1" position, unless functional groups of higher precedence are present.

If a prefix form is required, "oxo-" is used (as for ketones), with the position number indicating the end of a chain: CHOCH_{2}COOH is 3-oxopropanoic acid. If the carbon in the carbonyl group cannot be included in the attached chain (for instance in the case of cyclic aldehydes), the prefix "formyl-" or the suffix "-carbaldehyde" is used: C_{6}H_{11}CHO is cyclohexanecarbaldehyde. If an aldehyde is attached to a benzene and is the main functional group, the suffix becomes benzaldehyde.

=== Ketones ===

In general ketones (R_{2}C=O) take the suffix "-one" (pronounced own, not won) with a suffixed position number: CH_{3}CH_{2}CH_{2}COCH_{3} is pentan-2-one. If a higher precedence suffix is in use, the prefix "oxo-" is used: CH_{3}CH_{2}CH_{2}COCH_{2}CHO is 3-oxohexanal.

=== Carboxylic acids ===

In general, carboxylic acids (R−C(=O)OH) are named with the suffix -oic acid (etymologically a back-formation from benzoic acid). As with aldehydes, the carboxyl functional group must take the "1" position on the main chain and so the locant need not be stated. For example, CH_{3}−CH(OH)−COOH (lactic acid) is named 2-hydroxypropanoic acid with no "1" stated. Some traditional names for common carboxylic acids (such as acetic acid) are in such widespread use that they are retained in IUPAC nomenclature, though systematic names like ethanoic acid are also used. Carboxylic acids attached to a benzene ring are structural analogs of benzoic acid (Ph−COOH) and are named as one of its derivatives.

Citric acid

If there are multiple carboxyl groups on the same parent chain, multiplying prefixes are used: Malonic acid, CH_{2}(COOH)_{2}, is systematically named propanedioic acid. Alternatively, the suffix "-carboxylic acid" can be used in place of "oic acid", combined with a multiplying prefix if necessary – mellitic acid is benzenehexacarboxylic acid, for example. In the latter case, the carbon atoms in the carboxyl groups do not count as being part of the main chain, a rule that also applies to the prefix form "carboxy-". Citric acid serves as an example: it is formally named 2-hydroxypropane-1,2,3-tricarboxylic acid rather than 3-carboxy-3-hydroxypentanedioic acid.

=== Carboxylates ===
formula of a carboxylate ion

Salts of carboxylic acids are named following the usual cation-then-anion conventions used for ionic compounds in both IUPAC and common nomenclature systems. The name of the carboxylate anion (R−C(=O)O^{−}) is derived from that of the parent acid by replacing the "–oic acid" ending with "–oate" or "carboxylate." For example, NaC_{6}H_{5}CO_{2}, the sodium salt of benzoic acid (C_{6}H_{5}COOH), is called sodium benzoate. Where an acid has both a systematic and a common name (like CH_{3}COOH, for example, which is known as both acetic acid and as ethanoic acid), its salts can be named from either parent name. Thus, KCH_{3}CO_{2} can be named as potassium acetate or as potassium ethanoate. The prefix form, is "carboxylato-".

=== Esters ===

Esters (R−C(=O)O−R') are named as alkyl derivatives of carboxylic acids. The alkyl (R') group is named first. The R−C(=O)O part is then named as a separate word based on the carboxylic acid name, with the ending changed from "-oic acid" to "-oate" or "-carboxylate" For example, CH_{3}CH_{2}CH_{2}CH_{2}COOCH_{3} is methyl pentanoate, and (CH_{3})_{2}CHCH_{2}CH_{2}COOCH_{2}CH_{3} is ethyl 4-methylpentanoate. For esters such as ethyl acetate (CH_{3}COOCH_{2}CH_{3}), ethyl formate (HCOOCH_{2}CH_{3}) or dimethyl phthalate that are based on common acids, IUPAC recommends use of these established names, called retained names. The "-oate" changes to "-ate." Some simple examples, named both ways, are shown in the figure above.

If the alkyl group is not attached at the end of the chain, the bond position to the ester group is suffixed before "-yl": CH_{3}CH_{2}CH(CH_{3})OOCCH_{2}CH_{3} may be called butan-2-yl propanoate or butan-2-yl propionate.. The prefix form is "oxycarbonyl-" with the (R') group preceding.

=== Acyl groups ===

Acyl groups are named by stripping the "-ic acid" of the corresponding carboxylic acid and replacing it with "-yl." For example, CH_{3}CO−R is called ethanoyl-R.

=== Acyl halides ===

Simply add the name of the attached halide to the end of the acyl group. For example, CH_{3}COCl is ethanoyl chloride. An alternate suffix is "-carbonyl halide" as opposed to "-oyl halide". The prefix form is "halocarbonyl-".

=== Acid anhydrides ===

Acid anhydrides (R−C(=O)−O−C(=O)−R) have two acyl groups linked by an oxygen atom. If both acyl groups are the same, then the name of the carboxylic acid with the word acid is replaced with the word anhydride and the IUPAC name consists of two words. If the acyl groups are different, then they are named in alphabetical order in the same way, with anhydride replacing acid and IUPAC name consists of three words. For example, CH_{3}CO−O−OCCH_{3} is called ethanoic anhydride and CH_{3}CO−O−OCCH_{2}CH_{3} is called ethanoic propanoic anhydride.

=== Amines ===

Amines (R−NH_{2}) are named for the attached alkane chain with the suffix "-amine" (e.g., CH_{3}NH_{2} methanamine). If necessary, the bonding position is suffixed: CH_{3}CH_{2}CH_{2}NH_{2} propan-1-amine, CH_{3}CHNH_{2}CH_{3} propan-2-amine. The prefix form is "amino-".

For secondary amines (of the form R−NH−R), the longest carbon chain attached to the nitrogen atom becomes the primary name of the amine; the other chain is prefixed as an alkyl group with location prefix given as an italic N: CH_{3}NHCH_{2}CH_{3} is N-methylethanamine. Tertiary amines (R−NR−R) are treated similarly: CH_{3}CH_{2}N(CH_{3})CH_{2}CH_{2}CH_{3} is N-ethyl-N-methylpropanamine. Again, the substituent groups are ordered alphabetically.

=== Amides ===

Amides (R−C(=O)NH_{2}) take the suffix "-amide", or "-carboxamide" if the carbon in the amide group cannot be included in the main chain. The prefix form is "carbamoyl-". e.g., HCONH_{2} methanamide, CH_{3}CONH_{2} ethanamide.

Amides that have additional substituents on the nitrogen are treated similarly to the case of amines: they are ordered alphabetically with the location prefix N: HCON(CH_{3})_{2} is N,N-dimethylmethanamide, CH_{3}CON(CH_{3})_{2} is N,N-dimethylethanamide.

=== Nitriles ===

Nitriles (R−C≡N) are named by adding the suffix "-nitrile" to the longest hydrocarbon chain (including the carbon of the cyano group). It can also be named by replacing the "-oic acid" of their corresponding carboxylic acids with "-carbonitrile." The prefix form is "cyano-." Functional class IUPAC nomenclature may also be used in the form of alkyl cyanides. For example, CH_{3}CH_{2}CH_{2}CH_{2}C≡N is called pentanenitrile or butyl cyanide.

=== Cyclic compounds ===

Cycloalkanes and aromatic compounds can be treated as the main parent chain of the compound, in which case the positions of substituents are numbered around the ring structure. For example, the three isomers of xylene CH_{3}C_{6}H_{4}CH_{3}, commonly the ortho-, meta-, and para- forms, are 1,2-dimethylbenzene, 1,3-dimethylbenzene, and 1,4-dimethylbenzene. The cyclic structures can also be treated as functional groups themselves, in which case they take the prefix "cycloalkyl-" (e.g. "cyclohexyl-") or for benzene, "phenyl-".

The IUPAC nomenclature scheme becomes rapidly more elaborate for more complex cyclic structures, with notation for compounds containing conjoined rings, and many common names such as phenol being accepted as base names for compounds derived from them.

== Order of precedence of group ==
When compounds contain more than one functional group, the order of precedence determines which groups are named with prefix or suffix forms. The table below shows common groups in decreasing order of precedence. The highest-precedence group takes the suffix, with all others taking the prefix form. However, double and triple bonds only take suffix form (-en and -yn) and are used with other suffixes.

Prefixed substituents are ordered alphabetically (excluding any modifiers such as di-, tri-, etc.), e.g. chlorofluoromethane, not fluorochloromethane. If there are multiple functional groups of the same type, either prefixed or suffixed, the position numbers are ordered numerically (thus ethane-1,2-diol, not ethane-2,1-diol.) The N position indicator for amines and amides comes before "1", e.g., CH_{3}CH(CH_{3})CH_{2}NH(CH_{3}) is N,2-dimethylpropanamine.

Priority	Functional group	Formula	Prefix	Suffix
1	Cations e.g. Ammonium	NH^{+}_{4}	-onio- ammonio-	-onium -ammonium
2	Carboxylic acids Carbothioic S-acids Carboselenoic Se-acids Sulfonic acids Sulfinic acids	−COOH −COSH −COSeH −SO_{3}H −SO_{2}H	carboxy- sulfanylcarbonyl- selanylcarbonyl- sulfo- sulfino-	-oic acid* -thioic S-acid* -selenoic Se-acid* -sulfonic acid -sulfinic acid
3	Carboxylic acid derivatives Acid anhydride Esters Acyl halides Amides Imides Amidines	−COOCO− −COO− −COX −CONH_{2} −CONC< −CNHNH_{2}	acyloxy- R-oxycarbonyl- halocarbonyl- carbamoyl- -imido- amidino-	-R-oic anhydride -R-oate -oyl halide* -amide* -imide* -amidine*
4	Nitriles Isocyanides	−CN −NC	cyano- isocyano-	-nitrile* isocyanide
5	Aldehydes Thioaldehydes	−CHO −CHS	formyl- thioformyl-	-al* -thial*
6	Ketones Thioketones Selones Tellones	=O =S =Se =Te	oxo- sulfanylidene- selanylidene- tellanylidene-	-one -thione -selone -tellone
7	Alcohols Thiols Selenols Tellurols	−OH −SH −SeH −TeH	hydroxy- sulfanyl- selanyl- tellanyl-	-ol -thiol -selenol -tellurol
8	Hydroperoxides Peroxols Thioperoxols (Sulfenic acid) Dithioperoxols	−OOH −SOH −SSH	hydroperoxy- hydroxysulfanyl- disulfanyl-	-peroxol -SO-thioperoxol -dithioperoxol
9	Amines Imines Hydrazines	−NH_{2} =NH −NHNH_{2}	amino- imino- hydrazino-	-amine -imine -hydrazine

*Note: These suffixes, in which the carbon atom is counted as part of the preceding chain, are the most commonly used. See individual functional group articles for more details.

The order of remaining functional groups is only needed for substituted benzene and hence is not mentioned here.

== Common nomenclature – trivial names ==
Common nomenclature uses the older names for some organic compounds instead of using the prefixes for the carbon skeleton above. The pattern can be seen below.

Number of carbons	Prefix as in new system	Common name for alcohol	Common name for aldehyde	Common name for acid	Common name for ketone
1	Meth-	Methyl alcohol (wood alcohol)	Formaldehyde	Formic acid	NA
2	Eth-	Ethyl alcohol (grain alcohol)	Acetaldehyde	Acetic acid (vinegar)	NA
3	Prop-	Propyl alcohol	Propionaldehyde	Propionic acid	Acetone/dimethyl ketone
4	But-	Butyl alcohol	Butyraldehyde	Butyric acid	Methyl ethyl ketone
5	Pent-	Amyl alcohol	Valeraldehyde	Valeric acid	•Methyl propyl ketone •Diethyl ketone
6	Hex-	Caproyl alcohol	Caproaldehyde	Caproic acid	•Butyl methyl ketone •Ethyl propyl ketone
7	Hept-	Enanthyl alcohol	Enanthaldehyde	Enanthoic acid	•Methyl pentyl ketone •Butyl ethyl ketone •Dipropyl ketone
8	Oct-	Capryl alcohol	Caprylaldehyde	Caprylic acid	•Hexyl methyl ketone •Ethyl pentyl ketone •Butyl propyl ketone
9	Non-	Pelargonic alcohol	Pelargonaldehyde	Pelargonic acid	•Heptyl methyl ketone •Ethyl hexyl ketone •Pentyl propyl ketone •Dibutyl ketone
10	Dec-	Capric alcohol	Capraldehyde	Capric acid	•Methyl octyl ketone •Ethyl heptyl ketone •Hexyl propyl ketone •Butyl pentyl ketone
11	Undec-	-	-	-	The same pattern continues (see below)
12	Dodec-	Lauryl alcohol	Lauraldehyde	Lauric acid	The same pattern continues (see below)
13	Tridec-	-	-	-	The same pattern continues (see below)
14	Tetradec-	Myristyl alcohol	Myristaldehyde	Myristic acid	The same pattern continues (see below)
15	Pentadec-	-	-	-	The same pattern continues (see below)
16	Hexadec-	Cetyl alcohol Palmityl alcohol	Palmitaldehyde	Palmitic acid	The same pattern continues (see below)
17	Heptadec-	-	-	Margaric acid	The same pattern continues (see below)
18	Octadec-	Stearyl alcohol	Stearaldehyde	Stearic acid	The same pattern continues (see below)
19	Nonadec-	-	-	-	The same pattern continues (see below)
20	Icos-	Arachidyl alcohol	-	Arachidic acid	The same pattern continues (see below)
21	Henicos-	-	-	-	The same pattern continues (see below)
22	Docos-	Behenyl alcohol	-	Behenic acid	The same pattern continues (see below)
23	Tricos-	-	-	-	The same pattern continues (see below)
24	Tetracos-	Lignoceryl alcohol	-	Lignoceric acid	The same pattern continues (see below)
25	Pentacos-	-	-	-	The same pattern continues (see below)
26	Hexacos-	Ceryl alcohol	-	Cerotic acid	The same pattern continues (see below)
27	Heptacos-	-	-	-	The same pattern continues (see below)
28	Octacos-	Montanyl alcohol	-	Montanic acid	The same pattern continues (see below)
29	Nonacos-	-	-	-	The same pattern continues (see below)
30	Triacont-	Melissyl alcohol	-	Melissic acid	The same pattern continues (see below)
31	Hentriacont-	-	-	-	The same pattern continues (see below)
32	Dotriacont-	Lacceryl alcohol	-	Lacceroic acid	The same pattern continues (see below)
33	Tritriacont-	Psyllic alcohol	-	Psyllic acid	The same pattern continues (see below)
34	Tetratriacont-	Geddyl alcohol	-	Geddic acid	The same pattern continues (see below)
35	Pentatriacont-	-	-	Ceroplastic acid	The same pattern continues (see below)
36	Hexatriacont-	-	-	-	The same pattern continues (see below)
37	Heptatriacont-	-	-	-	The same pattern continues (see below)
38	Octatriacont-	-	-	-	The same pattern continues (see below)
39	Nonatriacont-	-	-	-	The same pattern continues (see below)
40	Tetracont-	-	-	-	The same pattern continues (see below)

=== Ketones ===
Common names for ketones can be derived by naming the two alkyl or aryl groups bonded to the carbonyl group as separate words followed by the word ketone.

- Acetone
- Acetophenone
- Benzophenone
- Ethyl isopropyl ketone
- Diethyl ketone

The first three of the names shown above are still considered to be acceptable IUPAC names.

=== Aldehydes ===
The common name for an aldehyde is derived from the common name of the corresponding carboxylic acid by dropping the word acid and changing the suffix from -ic or -oic to -aldehyde.

- Formaldehyde
- Acetaldehyde

== Ions ==
The IUPAC nomenclature also provides rules for naming ions.

=== Hydron ===
Hydron is a generic term for hydrogen cation; protons, deuterons and tritons are all hydrons. The hydrons are not found in heavier isotopes, however.

=== Parent hydride cations ===
Simple cations formed by adding a hydron to a hydride of a halogen, chalcogen or pnictogen are named by adding the suffix "-onium" to the element's root: H_{4}N^{+} is ammonium, H_{3}O^{+} is oxonium, and H_{2}F^{+} is fluoronium. Ammonium was adopted instead of nitronium, which commonly refers to NO^{+}_{2}.

If the cationic center of the hydride is not a halogen, chalcogen or pnictogen then the suffix "-ium" is added to the name of the neutral hydride after dropping any final 'e'. H_{5}C^{+} is methanium, HO−(O^{+})H_{2} is dioxidanium (HO-OH is dioxidane), and H_{2}N−(N^{+})H_{3} is diazanium (H_{2}N−NH_{2} is diazane).

=== Cations and substitution ===
The above cations except for methanium are not, strictly speaking, organic, since they do not contain carbon. However, many organic cations are obtained by substituting another element or some functional group for a hydrogen.

The name of each substitution is prefixed to the hydride cation name. If many substitutions by the same functional group occur, then the number is indicated by prefixing with "di-", "tri-" as with halogenation. (CH_{3})_{3}O^{+} is trimethyloxonium. CH_{3}F_{3}N^{+} is trifluoromethylammonium.

== See also ==
- Descriptor (chemistry)
- Hantzsch–Widman nomenclature
- International Union of Biochemistry and Molecular Biology
- Nucleic acid notation
- Organic nomenclature in Chinese
- Phanes
- Preferred IUPAC name
- Von Baeyer nomenclature
- IUPAC nomenclature of inorganic chemistry
