= IUPAC nomenclature of inorganic chemistry 2005 =

2005 edition of the Nomenclature of Inorganic Chemistry

Nomenclature of Inorganic Chemistry, IUPAC Recommendations 2005 is the 2005 version of Nomenclature of Inorganic Chemistry (which is informally called the Red Book). It is a collection of rules for naming inorganic compounds, as recommended by the International Union of Pure and Applied Chemistry (IUPAC).

== Summary ==
The 2005 edition replaces their previous recommendations Nomenclature The Red Book of Inorganic Chemistry, IUPAC Recommendations 1990 (Red Book I), and "where appropriate" (sic) Nomenclature of Inorganic Chemistry II, IUPAC Recommendations 2000 (Red Book II).

The recommendations take up over 300 pages and the full text can be downloaded from IUPAC. Corrections have been issued.

Apart from a reorganisation of the content, there is a new section on organometallics and a formal element list to be used in place of electronegativity lists in sequencing elements in formulae and names. The concept of a preferred IUPAC name (PIN), a part of the revised blue book for organic compound naming, has not yet been adopted for inorganic compounds. There are however guidelines as to which naming method should be adopted.

== Naming methods ==
The recommendations describe a number of different ways in which compounds can be named. These are:

- compositional naming (e.g. sodium chloride)
- substitutive naming based on parent hydrides (GeCl_{2}Me_{2} dichlorodimethylgermane)
- additive naming ([MnFO_{3}] fluoridotrioxidomanganese)

Additionally there are recommendations for the following:

- naming of cluster compounds
- allowed names for inorganic acids and derivatives
- naming of solid phases e.g. non-stoichiometric phases

For a simple compound such as AlCl_{3} the different naming conventions yield the following:

- compositional: aluminium trichloride (stoichiometrically) or dialuminium hexachloride (dimer)
- substitutional: trichloralumane
- additive: trichloridoaluminium; hexachloridodialuminium (dimer without structural information); di-μ-chlorido-tetrachlorido-1κ^{2}Cl,2κ^{2}Cl-dialuminium (dimer with structural information)

== Sequencing elements—the "electronegativity" list ==
Throughout the recommendations, the use of the electronegativity of elements for sequencing has been replaced by a formal list which is loosely based on electronegativity. The recommendations still use the terms electropositive and electronegative to refer to an element's relative position in this list.

A simple rule of thumb, ignoring lanthanides and actinides, is:

- for two elements in different groups, the element in the higher numbered group has higher "electronegativity"
- for two elements within the same group, the element with the lower atomic number has higher "electronegativity"
- Hydrogen is fitted in to be less electronegative than any chalcogen and more electronegative than any pnictogen. Hence the formulae of water and ammonia can be written H_{2}O and NH_{3} respectively.

The full list, from highest to lowest "electronegativity" (with the addition of elements 112 through 118, that had not yet been named in 2005, to their respective groups):

- Group 17 in atomic number sequence i.e. F–Ts followed by
- Group 16 in atomic number sequence i.e. O–Lv followed by
- H, hydrogen, followed by
- Group 15 in atomic number sequence i.e. N–Mc followed by
- Group 14 in atomic number sequence i.e. C–Fl followed by
- Group 13 in atomic number sequence i.e. B–Nh followed by
- Group 12 in atomic number sequence i.e. Zn–Cn followed by
- Group 11 in atomic number sequence i.e. Cu–Rg followed by
- Group 10 in atomic number sequence i.e. Ni–Ds followed by
- Group 9 in atomic number sequence i.e. Co–Mt followed by
- Group 8 in atomic number sequence i.e. Fe–Hs followed by
- Group 7 in atomic number sequence i.e. Mn–Bh followed by
- Group 6 in atomic number sequence i.e. Cr–Sg followed by
- Group 5 in atomic number sequence i.e. V–Db followed by
- Group 4 in atomic number sequence i.e. Ti–Rf followed by
- Group 3 in atomic number sequence i.e. Sc–Y followed by
- the lanthanoids in atomic number sequence i.e. La–Lu followed by
- the actinoids in atomic number sequence i.e. Ac–Lr followed by
- Group 2 in atomic number sequence i.e. Be–Ra followed by
- Group 1 (excluding H) in atomic number sequence i.e. Li–Fr followed by
- Group 18 in atomic number sequence i.e. He–Og

== Determining the nomenclature to use ==
Decision table based on IUPAC flowchart
Action	Addition compound?	Definite stoichiometry?	mono-atomic?	molecular?	metal present?	Bond to carbon?	transition metal group 3–12?	main group metal groups 1, 2, 3–6?
Treat each component separately use compositional	Yes							
Use solids naming	No	No						
Element or monatomic cation/anion/radical naming	No	Yes	Yes					
Divide components into "electropositive"/"electronegative" Treat each component separately Use generalised stoichiometric naming	No	Yes	No	No				
Use Blue book (Organic compound)	No	Yes	No	Yes	No	Yes		
Use additive naming for group 3- 12 organometallics	No	Yes	No	Yes	Yes	Yes	Yes	
Use substitutive naming for group 3–6 organometallics Use compositional for groups 1–2 organometallics	No	Yes	No	Yes	Yes	Yes	No	Yes
Use additive naming for coordination complexes	No	Yes	No	Yes	Yes	No	Yes	
Choose either substitutive or additive	No	Yes	No	Yes	No	No		

Note "treat separately" means to use the decision table on each component

== Element names ==
=== Sample of indeterminate structure ===
An indeterminate sample simply takes the element name. For example a sample of carbon (which could be diamond, graphite etc or a mixture) would be named carbon.

=== Specific allotrope ===
==== Molecular ====
- O_{2} dioxygen (acceptable name oxygen)
- O_{3} trioxygen (acceptable name ozone)
- P_{4} tetraphosphorus (acceptable name white phosphorus)
- S_{6} hexasulfur (acceptable name ε-sulfur)
- S_{8} cyclo-octasulfur (acceptable names for the polymorphic forms are α-sulfur, β-sulfur, γ-sulfur)

==== Crystalline form ====
This is specified by the element symbol followed by the Pearson symbol for the crystal form. (Note that the recommendations specifically italicize the second character.)

- C_{n} carbon(cF8) (acceptable name diamond)
- Sn_{n} tin(tI4) (acceptable name β- or white tin)
- Mn_{n} manganese(cI58) (acceptable name α-manganese)

==== Amorphous recognised allotropes ====
Examples include P_{n},. red phosphorus ; As_{n}, amorphous arsenic.

== Compounds ==
Compositional names impart little structural information and are recommended for use when structural information is not available or does not need to be conveyed. Stoichiometric names are the simplest and reflect either the empirical formula or the molecular formula. The ordering of the elements follows the formal electronegativity list for binary compounds and electronegativity list to group the elements into two classes which are then alphabetically sequenced. The proportions are specified by di-, tri-, etc. (See IUPAC numerical multiplier.) Where there are known to be complex cations or anions these are named in their own right and then these names used as part of the compound name.

=== Binary compounds ===
In binary compounds the more electropositive element is placed first in the formula. The formal list is used. The name of the most electronegative element is modified to end in -ide and the more electropositive elements name is left unchanged.

Taking the binary compound of sodium and chlorine: chlorine is found first in the list so therefore comes last in the name. Other examples are

- PCl_{5} phosphorus pentachloride
- Ca_{2}P_{3} dicalcium triphosphide
- NiSn nickel stannide
- Cr_{23}C_{6} tricosachromium hexacarbide

=== Ternary compounds and beyond ===
The following illustrate the principles.

The 1:1:1:1 quaternary compound between bromine, chlorine, iodine and phosphorus:

- PBrClI phosphorus bromide chloride iodide (phosphorus is the most electropositive, the others are all designated as electronegative and are sequenced alphabetically)

The ternary 2:1:5 compound of antimony, copper and potassium can be named in two ways depending on which element(s) are designated as electronegative.

- CuK_{5}Sb_{2} copper pentapotassium diantimonide, (both copper and potassium are designated as electropositive and are sequenced alphabetically)
- K_{5}CuSb_{2} pentapotassium diantimonide cupride (only potassium is designated as electropositive and the two electronegative elements are sequenced alphabetically) (Note the red book shows this example incorrectly)

=== Naming of ions and radicals ===
==== Cations ====
Monatomic cations are named by taking the element name and following it with the charge in brackets e.g

- Na^{+} sodium(1+)
- Cr^{3+} chromium(3+)

Sometimes an abbreviated form of the element name has to be taken, e.g. germide for germanium as germanide refers to GeH^{−}_{3}.

Polyatomic cations of the same element are named as the element name preceded by di-, tri-, etc., e.g.:

- Hg^{2+}_{2} dimercury(2+)

Polyatomic cations made up of different elements are named either substitutively or additively, e.g.:

- PH^{+}_{4} phosphanium
- SbF^{+}_{4} tetrafluorostibanium (substitutive) or tetrafluoridoantimony(1+)
- Note that ammonium and oxonium are acceptable names for NH^{+}_{4} and H_{3}O^{+} respectively. (Hydronium is not an acceptable name for H_{3}O^{+})

==== Anions ====
Monatomic anions are named as the element modified with an -ide ending. The charge follows in brackets, (optional for 1−) e.g.:

- Cl^{−} chloride(1−) or chloride
- S^{2−} sulfide(2−)

Some elements take their Latin name as the root e.g

- silver, Ag, argentide
- copper, Cu, cupride
- iron, Fe, ferride
- tin, Sn, stannide

Polyatomic anions of the same element are named as the element name preceded by di-, tri-, etc., e.g.:

- O_{2}^{2−} dioxide(2−) (or peroxide as an acceptable name)
- C_{2}^{2−} dicarbide(2−) (or acetylide as an acceptable name)
- S_{2}^{2−} disulfide(2−)

or sometimes as an alternative derived from a substitutive name e.g.

- S_{2}^{2−} disulfanediide

Polyatomic anions made up of different elements are named either substitutively or additively, the name endings are -ide and -ate respectively e.g. :

- GeH_{3}^{−} germanide (substitutive), or trihydridogermanate(1−) (additive)
- TeH_{3}^{−} tellanuide substitutive where -uide specifies anion composed of additional hydride attached to parent hydride
- [PF_{6}]^{−} hexafluoro-λ^{5}-phosphanuide (substitutive), or hexafluoridophosphate(1−) (additive)
- SO_{3}^{2−} trioxidosulfate(2−) (additive), or sulfite (acceptable non-systematic name)

A full list of the alternative acceptable non-systematic names for cations and anions is in the recommendations. Many anions have names derived from inorganic acids and these are dealt with later.

==== Radicals ====
The presence of unpaired electrons can be indicated by a "·". For example:

- He^{·+} helium(·+)
- N_{2}^{(2·)2+} dinitrogen(2·2+)

==== Naming of hydrates and similar lattice compounds ====
The use of the term hydrate is still acceptable e.g. Na_{2}SO_{4}·10H_{2}O, sodium sulfate decahydrate. The recommended method would be to name it sodium sulfate—water(1/10). Similarly other examples of lattice compounds are:

- CaCl_{2}·8NH_{3}, calcium chloride— ammonia (1/8)
- 2Na_{2}CO_{3}·3H_{2}O_{2}, sodium carbonate—hydrogen peroxide (2/3)
- AlCl_{3}·4EtOH, aluminium chloride—ethanol (1/4)

== Specifying proportions using charge or oxidation state ==
As an alternative to di-, tri- prefixes either charge or oxidation state can be used. Charge is recommended as oxidation state may be ambiguous and open to debate.

== Substitutive nomenclature ==
This naming method generally follows established IUPAC organic nomenclature. Hydrides of the main group elements (groups 13–17) are given -ane base names, e.g. borane, BH_{3}. Acceptable alternative names for some of the parent hydrides are water rather than oxidane and ammonia rather than azane. In these cases the base name is intended to be used for substituted derivatives.

This section of the recommendations covers the naming of compounds containing rings and chains.

== Base hydrides ==
BH_{3}	borane	CH_{4}	methane	NH_{3}	azane (ammonia)	H_{2}O	oxidane (water)	HF	fluorane (hydrogen fluoride)
AlH_{3}	alumane	SiH_{4}	silane	PH_{3}	phosphane (phosphine)	H_{2}S	sulfane (hydrogen sulfide or dihydrogen sulfide)	HCl	chlorane (hydrogen chloride)
GaH_{3}	gallane	GeH_{4}	germane	AsH_{3}	arsane (arsine)	H_{2}Se	selane (hydrogen selenide or dihydrogen selenide)	HBr	bromane (hydrogen bromide)
InH_{3}	indigane	SnH_{4}	stannane	SbH_{3}	stibane (stibine)	H_{2}Te	tellane (hydrogen telluride or dihydrogen telluride)	HI	iodane (hydrogen iodide)
TlH_{3}	thallane	PbH_{4}	plumbane	BiH_{3}	bismuthane (bismuthine)	H_{2}Po	polane (hydrogen polonide or dihydrogen polonide)	HAt	astatane (hydrogen astatide)

== Hydrides with non-standard bonding—lambda convention ==
Where a compound has non standard bonding as compared to the parent hydride for example PCl_{5} the lambda convention is used. For example:

- PCl_{5} pentachloro-λ^{5}-phosphane
- SF_{6} hexafluoro-λ^{6}-sulfane

== Polynuclear hydrides ==
A prefix di-, tri- etc. is added to the parent hydride name. Examples are:

- HOOH, dioxidane (hydrogen peroxide is an acceptable name)
- H_{2}PPH_{2}, diphosphane
- H_{3}SiSiH_{2}SiH_{2}SiH_{3}, tetrasilane

== Rings and chains ==
The recommendations describe three ways of assigning "parent" names to homonuclear monocyclic hydrides (i.e single rings consisting of one element):

- the Hantzsch–Widman nomenclature (the method preferred for rings of size 3–10)
- "skeletal replacement nomenclature"—specifying the replacement of carbon atoms in the corresponding carbon compound with atoms of another element (e.g. silicon becomes sila, germanium, germa) and a multiplicative prefix tri, tetra, penta etc)( the method preferred for rings greater than 10)
- by adding the prefix cyclo to the name of the corresponding unbranched, unsubstituted chain

== Boron hydrides ==
The stoichiometric name is followed by the number of hydrogen atoms in brackets. For example B_{2}H_{6}, diborane(6). More structural information can be conveyed by adding the "structural descriptor" closo-, nido-, arachno-, hypho-, klado- prefixes.
There is a fully systematic method of numbering the atoms in the boron hydride clusters, and a method of describing the position of bridging hydrogen atoms using the μ symbol.

== Main group organometallic compounds ==
Use of substitutive nomenclature is recommended for group 13–16 main group organometallic compounds. Examples are:

- AlH_{2}Me named methylalumane
- BiI_{2}Ph named diiodo(phenyl)bismuthane

For organometallic compounds of groups 1–2 can use additive (indicating a molecular aggregate) or compositional naming. Examples are:

- [BeEtH] named ethylhydridoberyllium or ethanidohydridoberyllium
- [Mg(η^{5}-C_{5}H_{5})_{2}] named bis(η^{5}-cyclopentadienyl)magnesium, or bis(η^{5}-cyclopentadienido)magnesium
- Na(CHCH_{2}) sodium ethenide (compositional name)

However the recommendation notes that future nomenclature projects will be addressing these compounds.

== Additive nomenclature ==
This naming has been developed principally for coordination compounds although it can be more widely applied. Examples are:

- Si(OH)_{4} tetrahydroxidosilicon (additive), or silanetetrol (substitutive) (note silicic acid is an acceptable name—orthosilicic has been dropped).
- [CoCl(NH_{3})_{5}]Cl_{2} pentaamminechloridocobalt(2+) chloride

== Recommended procedure for naming mononuclear compounds ==
The recommendations include a flow chart which can be summarised very briefly:

- identify the central atom,
- identify and name the ligands,
- specify coordination mode of ligands i.e. using kappa and/or eta conventions
- sequence the ligands
- specify coordination geometry i.e polyhedral symbol, configuration index (using CIP rules and absolute configuration for optically active compounds.

== Ligand names ==
=== Anionic ligands ===
If the anion name ends in -ide then as a ligand its name is changed to end in -o. For example the chloride anion, Cl^{−} becomes chlorido. This is a difference from organic compound naming and substitutive naming where chlorine is treated as neutral and it becomes chloro, as in PCl_{3}, which can be named as either substitutively or additively as trichlorophosphane or trichloridophosphorus respectively.

Similarly if the anion names end in -ite, -ate then the ligand names are -ito, -ato.

=== Neutral ligands ===
Neutral ligands do not change name with the exception of the following:

- Water, "aqua"
- Ammonia, "ammine"
- Carbon monoxide bonded via carbon, "carbonyl"
- Nitrogen monoxide bonded via nitrogen, "nitrosyl"

=== Examples of ligand names ===
Formula	name
Cl^{−}	chlorido
CN^{−}	cyanido
H^{−}	hydrido
D^{−}or ^{2}H^{−}	deuterido or [^{2}H]hydrido
PhCH_{2}CH_{2}Se^{−}	2-phenylethane-1-selenolato
MeCOO^{−}	acetato or ethanoato
Me_{2}As^{−}	dimethylarsanido
MePH^{−}	methylphosphanido
MeCONH_{2}	acetamide (not acetamido)
MeCONH^{−}	acetylazanido or acetylamido (not acetamido)
MeNH_{2}	methanamine
MeNH^{−}	methylazanido, or methylamido, or methanaminido
MePH_{2}	methylphosphane
CO	carbonyl

=== Sequence and position of ligands and central atoms ===
Ligands are ordered alphabetically by name and precede the central atom name. The number of ligands coordinating is indicated by the prefixes di-, tri-, tetra- penta- etc. for simple ligands or bis-, tris-, tetrakis-, etc. for complex ligands. For example:

- [CoCl(NH_{3})_{5}]Cl_{2} pentaamminechloridocobalt(3+) chloride where ammine (NH_{3})precedes chloride. The central atom name(s) come after the ligands. Where there is more than one central atom it is preceded by di- tri-, tetra- etc.
- Os_{3}(CO)_{12}, dodecacarbonyltriosmium

Where there are different central atoms they are sequenced using the electronegativity list.

- [ReCo(CO)_{9}] nonacarbonylrheniumcobalt

=== Bridging ligands—use of μ symbol ===
Ligands may bridge two or more centres. The prefix μ is used to specify a bridging ligand in both the formula and the name. For example the dimeric form of aluminium trichloride:

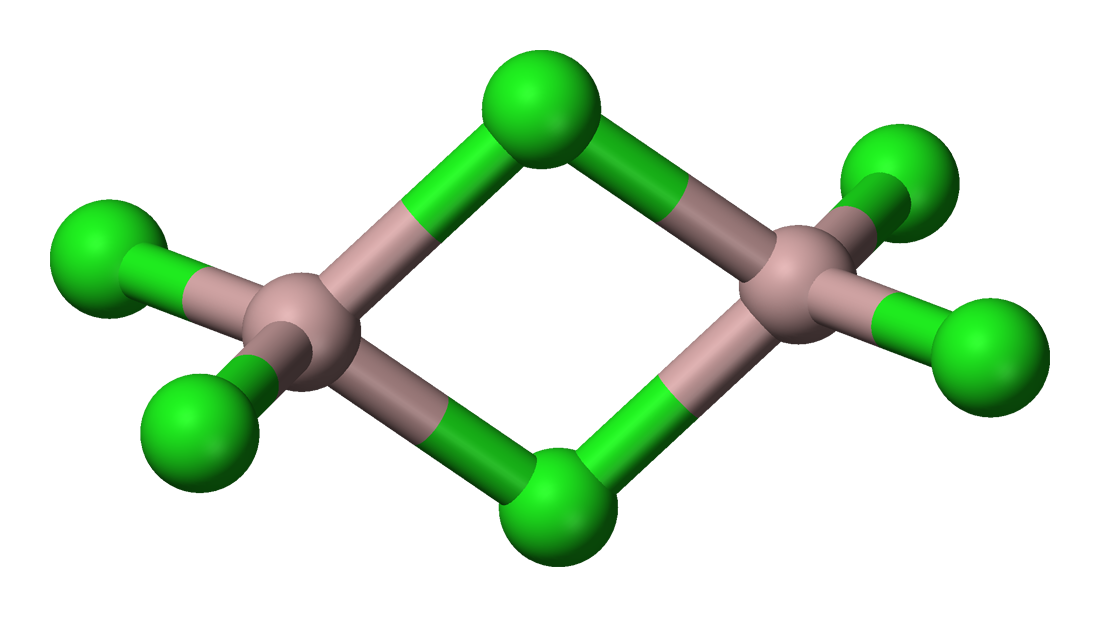

Al_{2}Cl_{4}(μ-Cl)_{2}

di-μ-chlorido-tetrachlorido-1κ^{2}Cl,2κ^{2}Cl-dialuminium

This example illustrates the ordering of bridging and non bridging ligands of the same type. In the formula the bridging ligands follow the non bridging whereas in the name the bridging ligands precede the non bridging. Note the use of the kappa convention to specify that there are two terminal chlorides on each aluminium.

==== Bridging index ====
Where there are more than two centres that are bridged a bridging index is added as a subscript. For example in basic beryllium acetate which can be visualised as a tetrahedral arrangement of Be atoms linked by 6 acetate ions forming a cage with a central oxide anion, the formula and name are as follows:

[Be_{4}(μ_{4}-O)(μ-O_{2}CMe)_{6}]

hexakis(μ-acetato-κO:κO′)-μ_{4}-oxido-tetrahedro-tetraberyllium

The μ_{4} describes the bridging of the central oxide ion. (Note the use of the kappa convention to describe the bridging of the acetate ion where both oxygen atoms are involved.) In the name where a ligand is involved in different modes of bridging, the multiple bridging is listed in decreasing order of complexity, e.g. μ_{3} bridging before μ_{2} bridging.

=== Kappa, κ, convention ===
The kappa convention is used to specify which ligand atoms are bonding to the central atom and in polynuclear species which atoms, both bridged and unbridged, link to which central atom. For monodentate ligands there is no ambiguity as to which atom is forming the bond to the central atom. However when a ligand has more than one atom that can link to a central atom the kappa convention is used to specify which atoms in a ligand are forming a bond. The element atomic symbol is italicised and preceded by kappa, κ. These symbols are placed after the portion of the ligand name that represents the ring, chain etc where the ligand is located. For example:

- pentaamminenitrito-κO-cobalt(III) specifies that the nitrite ligand is linking via the oxygen atom

Where there is more than one bond formed from a ligand by a particular element a numerical superscript gives the count. For example:

- aqua[(ethane-1,2-diyldinitrilo-κ^{2}N,N′)tris(acetato-κO)acetato]cobaltate(1-), the cobalt anion formed with water and pentadentate edta, which links via two nitrogen atoms and three oxygen atoms. There are two bonds from nitrogen atoms in edta which is specified by -κ^{2}N,N′. The three bonds from oxygen are specified by tris(acetato-κO), where there is one ligation per acetate.

In polynuclear complexes the use of the kappa symbol is extended in two related ways. Firstly to specify which ligating atoms bind to which central atom and secondly to specify for a bridging ligand which central atoms are involved. The central atoms must be identified, i.e. by assigning numbers to them. (This is formally dealt with in the recommendations). To specify which ligating atoms in a ligand link to which central atom, the central atom numbers precede the kappa symbol, and numerical superscript specifies the number of ligations and this is followed by the atomic symbol. Multiple occurrences are separated by commas.

Examples:

di-μ-chlorido-tetrachlorido-1κ^{2}Cl,2κ^{2}Cl-dialuminium, (aluminium trichloride).

tetrachlorido-1κ^{2}Cl,2κ^{2}Cl specifies that there are two chloride ligands on each aluminium atom.

decacarbonyl-1κ^{3}C,2κ^{3}C,3κ^{4}C-di-μ-hydrido-1:2κ^{2}H;1:2κ^{2}H-triangulo-(3 Os—Os), (Decacarbonyldihydridotriosmium).

decacarbonyl-1κ^{3}C,2κ^{3}C,3κ^{4}C shows that there are three carbonyl groups on two osmium atoms and four on the third.
di-μ-hydrido-1:2κ^{2}H;1:2κ^{2}H specifies that the two hydride bridge between the osmium atom 1 and osmium atom 2.

=== Eta, η, convention ===
The use of η to denote hapticity is systematised. The use of η^{1} is not recommended. When the specification of the atoms involved is ambiguous the position of the atoms must be specified. This is illustrated by the examples:

- Cr(η^{6}-C_{6}H_{6})_{2}, named as bis(η^{6}-benzene)chromium as all of the (contiguous) atoms in the benzene ligands are involved their position does not have to be specified
- [(1,2,5,6-η)-cycloocta-1,3,5,7-tetraene](η^{5}-cyclopentadienyl)cobalt in this only two (at positions 1 and 5) of the four double bonds are linked to the central atom.

== Coordination geometry ==
For any coordination number above 2 more than one coordination geometry is possible. For example four coordinate coordination compounds can be tetrahedral, square planar, square pyramidal or see-saw shaped. The polyhedral symbol is used to describe the geometry. A configuration index is determined from the positions of the ligands and together with the polyhedral symbol is placed at the beginning of the name. For example in the complex (SP-4-3)-(acetonitrile)dichlorido(pyridine)platinum(II) the (SP-4-3) at the beginning of the name describes a square planar geometry, 4 coordinate with a configuration index of 3 indicating the position of the ligands around the central atom. For more detail see polyhedral symbol.

== Organometallic groups 3–12 ==
Additive nomenclature is generally recommended for organometallic compounds of groups 3-12 (transition metals and zinc, cadmium and mercury).

=== Metallocenes ===
Following on from ferrocene—the first sandwich compound with a central Fe atom coordinated to two parallel cyclopentadienyl rings—names for compounds with similar structures such as osmocene and vanadocene are in common usage. The recommendation is that the name-ending ocene should be restricted to compounds where there are discrete molecules of bis(η^{5}-cyclopentadienyl)metal (and ring-substituted analogues), where the cyclopentadienyl rings are essentially parallel, and the metal is in the d-block. The terminology does NOT apply to compounds of the s- or p-block elements such as Ba(C_{5}H_{5})_{2} or Sn(C_{5}H_{5})_{2}.

Examples of compounds that meet the criteria are:

- vanadocene, [V(η^{5}-C_{5}H_{5})_{2}]
- chromocene, [Cr(η^{5}-C_{5}H_{5})_{2}]
- cobaltocene, [Co(η^{5}-C_{5}H_{5})_{2}]
- rhodocene, [Rh(η^{5}-C_{5}H_{5})_{2}]
- nickelocene, [Ni(η^{5}-C_{5}H_{5})_{2}]
- ruthenocene, [Ru(η^{5}-C_{5}H_{5})_{2}]
- osmocene, [Os(η^{5}-C_{5}H_{5})_{2}]
- manganocene, [Mn(η^{5}-C_{5}H_{5})_{2}]
- rhenocene, [Re(η^{5}-C_{5}H_{5})_{2}].

Examples of compounds that should not be named as metallocenes are:

- C_{10}H_{10}Ti
- [Ti(η^{5}-C_{5}H_{5})_{2}Cl_{2}] is properly named dichloridobis(η^{5}-cyclopentadienyl)titanium NOT titanocene dichloride

== Polynuclear cluster compounds ==
=== Metal-metal bonds ===
In polynuclear compounds with metal-metal bonds these are shown after the element name as follows: (3 Os—Os) in Decacarbonyldihydridotriosmium. A pair of brackets contain a count of the bonds formed (if greater than 1), followed by the italicised element atomic symbols separated by an "em-dash".

=== Polynuclear cluster geometry ===
The geometries of polynuclear clusters can range in complexity. A descriptor e.g. tetrahedro or the CEP descriptor e.g. Td-(13)-Δ^{4}-closo] can be used. this is determined by the complexity of the cluster. Some examples are shown below of descriptors and CEP equivalents. (The CEP descriptors are named for Casey, Evans and Powell who described the system.

number of atoms	descriptor	CEP descriptor
3	triangulo	
4	quadro	
4	tetrahedro	[Td-(13)-Δ^{4}-closo]
5		[D_{3h}-(131)-Δ^{6}-closo]
6	octahedro	[O_{h}-(141)-Δ^{8}-closo]
6	triprismo	
8	antiprismo	
8	dodecahedro	[D_{2d}-(2222)-Δ^{6}-closo]
12	icosahedro	[I_{h}-(1551)-Δ^{20}-closo]

Examples:

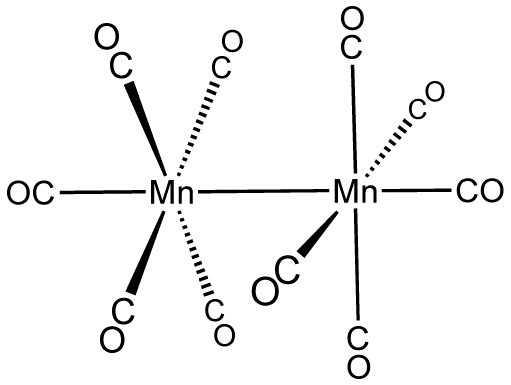
decacarbonyldimanganese bis(pentacarbonylmanganese)(Mn—Mn)

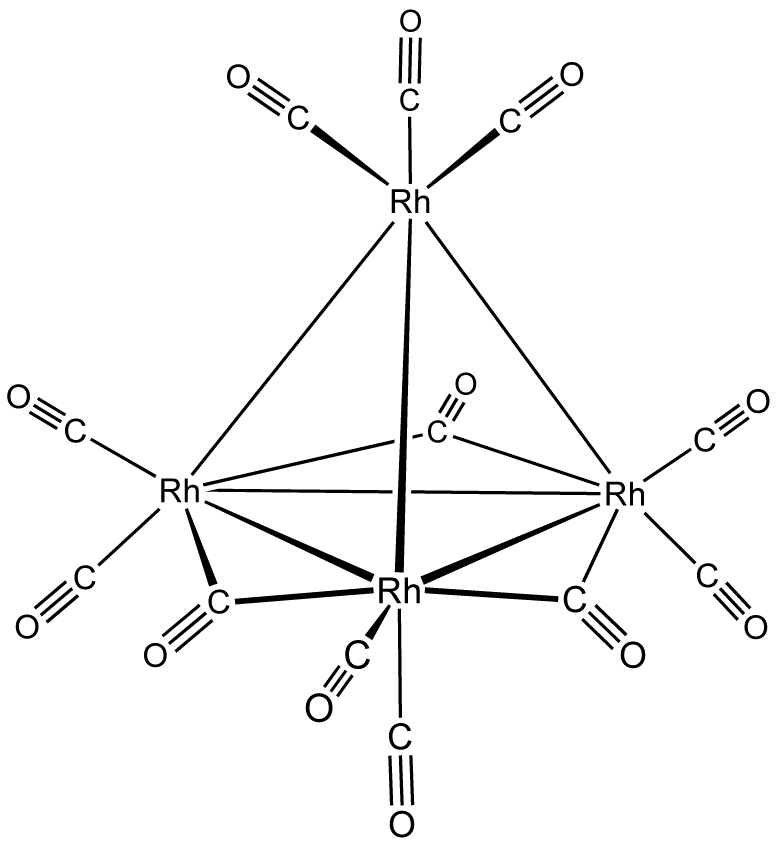
dodecacarbonyltetrarhodium tri-μ-carbonyl-1:2κ^{2}C;1:3κ^{2}C;2:3κ^{2}C-nonacarbonyl- 1κ^{2}C,2κ^{2}C,3κ^{2}C,4κ^{3}C-[T_{d}-(13)-Δ^{4}-closo]-tetrarhodium(6 Rh—Rh)
or tri-μ-carbonyl-1:2κ^{2}C;1:3κ^{2}C;2:3κ^{2}C-nonacarbonyl- 1κ^{2}C,2κ^{2}C,3κ^{2}C,4κ^{3}C-tetrahedro-tetrarhodium(6 Rh—Rh)

== Inorganic acids ==
=== Hydrogen names ===
The recommendations include a description of hydrogen names for acids. The following examples illustrate the method:

- HNO_{3} hydrogen(nitrate)
- H_{2}SO_{4} dihydrogen(sulfate)
- HSO^{−}_{4} hydrogen(sulfate)(2−)
- H_{2}S dihydrogen(sulfide)

Note that the difference from the compositional naming method (hydrogen sulfide) as in hydrogen naming there is NO space between the electropositive and electronegative components.

This method gives no structural information regarding the position of the hydrons (hydrogen atoms). If this information is to be conveyed then the additive name should be used (see the list below for examples).

=== List of acceptable names ===
The recommendations give a full list of acceptable names for common acids and related anions. A selection from this list is shown below.

caption
acid acceptable name	related anions- acceptable names and additive names		
boric acid, [B(OH)_{3}]	dihydrogenborate, [BO(OH)_{2}]^{−} dihydroxidooxidoborate(1—)	hydrogenborate, [BO_{2}(OH)]^{2}^{−} hydroxidodioxidoborate(2—)	borate, [BO_{3}]^{3}^{−} trioxidoborate(3—)
carbonic acid, [CO(OH)_{2}]	hydrogencarbonate, [CO_{2}(OH)]^{−} hydroxidodioxidocarbonate(1−)	carbonate, [CO_{3}]^{2}^{−} trioxidocarbonate(2−)	
chloric acid, [ClO_{2}(OH)] hydroxidodioxidochlorine	chlorate, [ClO_{3}]^{−} trioxidochlorate(1−)		
chlorous acid, [ClO(OH)] hydroxidooxidochlorine	chlorite, [ClO_{2}]^{−} dioxidochlorate(1−)		
nitric acid, [NO_{2}(OH)] hydroxidodioxidonitrogen	nitrate, [NO^{−}_{3}] trioxidonitrate(1−)		
nitrous acid, [NO(OH)] hydroxidooxidonitrogen	nitrite, [NO_{2}]^{−} dioxidonitrate(1−)		
perchloric acid, [ClO_{3}(OH)] hydroxidotrioxidochlorine	perchlorate, [ClO_{4}]^{−} tetraoxidochlorate(1−)		
phosphoric acid, [PO(OH)_{3}] trihydroxidooxidophosphorus	dihydrogenphosphate, [PO_{2}(OH)_{2}]^{−} dihydroxidodioxidophosphate(1−)	hydrogenphosphate, [PO_{3}(OH)]^{2}^{−} hydroxidotrioxidophosphate(2−)	phosphate, [PO_{4}]^{3}^{−} tetraoxidophosphate(3—)
phosphonic acid, [PHO(OH)_{2}] hydridodihydroxidooxidophosphorus	hydrogenphosphonate, [PHO_{2}(OH)]^{−} hydridohydroxidodioxidophosphate(1−)	phosphonate, [PHO_{3}]^{2}^{−} hydridotrioxidophosphate(2−)	
phosphorous acid, H_{3}PO_{3} trihydroxidophosphorus	dihydrogenphosphite [PO(OH)_{2}]^{−} dihydroxidooxidophosphate(1−))	hydrogenphosphite, [PO_{2}(OH)]^{2}^{−} hydroxidodioxidophosphate(2−)	phosphite, [PO_{3}]^{3}^{−} trioxidophosphate(3−)
sulfuric acid, [SO_{2}(OH)_{2}] dihydroxidodioxidosulfur	hydrogensulfate, [SO_{3}(OH)]^{−} hydroxidotrioxidosulfate(1−)	sulfate, [SO_{4}]^{2}^{−} tetraoxidosulfate(2−)	

== Solids ==
Stoichiometric phases are named compositionally. Non-stoichiometric phases are more difficult. Where possible formulae should be used but where necessary naming such as the following may be used:

- iron(II) sulfide (iron deficient)
- molybdenum dicarbide (carbon excess)

=== Mineral names ===
Generally mineral names should not be used to specify chemical composition. However a mineral name can be used to specify the structure type in a formula e.g.

- BaTiO_{3} (perovskite type)

=== Approximate formulae and variable composition ===
A simple notation may be used where little information on the mechanism for variability is either available or is not required to be conveyed:

- ~FeS (circa or approximately)

Where there is a continuous range of composition this can be written e.g., K(Br,Cl) for a mixture of KBr and KCl and (Li_{2},Mg)Cl_{2} for a mixture of LiCl and MgCl_{2}. The recommendation is to use the following generalised method e.g.

- Cu_{x}Ni_{1−x} for (Cu,Ni)
- KBr_{x}Cl_{1−x} for K(Br,Cl)

Note that cation vacancies in CoO could be described by CoO_{1−x}

=== Point defects (Kröger–Vink) notation ===
Point defects, site symmetry and site occupancy can all be described using Kröger–Vink notation, note that the IUPAC preference is for vacancies to be specified by V rather than V (the element vanadium).

=== Phase nomenclature ===
To specify the crystal form of a compound or element the Pearson symbol may be used. The use of Strukturbericht (e.g. A1 etc) or Greek letters is not acceptable. The Pearson symbol may be followed by the space group and the prototype formula. Examples are:

- carbon(cF 8 ), diamond
- RuAl(CP22, Pm3m)(CsCl type)

== Polymorphism ==
It is recommended that polymorphs are identified (e.g. for ZnS where the two forms zincblende (cubic) and wurtzite (hexagonal)), as ZnS(c) and ZnS(h) respectively.
