= IUPAC nomenclature of inorganic chemistry =

Systematic method of naming inorganic chemical compounds

In chemical nomenclature, the IUPAC nomenclature of inorganic chemistry is a systematic method of naming inorganic chemical compounds, as recommended by the International Union of Pure and Applied Chemistry (IUPAC). It is published in Nomenclature of Inorganic Chemistry (which is informally called the Red Book). Ideally, every inorganic compound should have a name from which an unambiguous formula can be determined. There is also an IUPAC nomenclature of organic chemistry.

== System ==
The names "caffeine" and "3,7-dihydro-1,3,7-trimethyl-1H-purine-2,6-dione" both signify the same chemical compound. The systematic name encodes the structure and composition of the caffeine molecule in some detail, and provides an unambiguous reference to this compound, whereas the name "caffeine" simply names it. These advantages make the systematic name far superior to the common name when absolute clarity and precision are required. However, for the sake of brevity, even professional chemists will use the non-systematic name almost all of the time, because caffeine is a well-known common chemical with a unique structure. Similarly, H_{2}O is most often simply called water in English, though other chemical names do exist.

1. Single atom anions are named with an -ide suffix: for example, F^{−} is fluoride.
2. Compounds with a positive ion (cation): The name of the compound is simply the cation's name (usually the same as the element's), followed by the anion. For example, NaCl is sodium chloride, and CaF_{2} is calcium fluoride.
3. Cations of transition metals able to take multiple charges are labeled with Roman numerals in parentheses to indicate their charge. For example, Cu^{+} is copper(I), Cu^{2+} is copper(II). An older, deprecated notation is to append -ous or -ic to the root of the Latin name to name ions with a lesser or greater charge. Under this naming convention, Cu^{+} is cuprous and Cu^{2+} is cupric. For naming metal complexes see the page on complex (chemistry).
4. Oxyanions (polyatomic anions containing oxygen) are named with -ite or -ate, for a lesser or greater quantity of oxygen, respectively. For example, NO^{−}_{2} is nitrite, while NO^{−}_{3} is nitrate. If four oxyanions are possible, the prefixes hypo- and per- are used: hypochlorite is ClO^{−}, perchlorate is ClO^{−}_{4}.
5. The prefix bi- is a deprecated way of indicating the presence of a single hydrogen ion, as in "sodium bicarbonate" (NaHCO_{3}). The modern method specifically names the hydrogen atom. Thus, NaHCO_{3} would be pronounced sodium hydrogen carbonate.

Positively charged ions are called cations and negatively charged ions are called anions. The cation is always named first. Ions can be metals, non-metals or polyatomic ions. Therefore, the name of the metal or positive polyatomic ion is followed by the name of the non-metal or negative polyatomic ion. The positive ion retains its element name whereas for a single non-metal anion the ending is changed to -ide.

Example: sodium chloride, potassium oxide, or calcium carbonate.

When the metal has more than one possible ionic charge or oxidation number the name becomes ambiguous. In these cases the oxidation number (the same as the charge) of the metal ion is represented by a Roman numeral in parentheses immediately following the metal ion name. For example, in uranium(VI) fluoride the oxidation number of uranium is 6. Another example is the iron oxides. FeO is iron(II) oxide and Fe_{2}O_{3} is iron(III) oxide.

An older system used prefixes and suffixes to indicate the oxidation number, according to the following scheme:

Oxidation state	Cations and acids	Anions
Lowest	hypo- -ous	hypo- -ite
	-ous	-ite
	-ic	-ate
	per- -ic	per- -ate
Highest	hyper- -ic	hyper- -ate

Thus the four oxyacids of chlorine are called hypochlorous acid (HOCl), chlorous acid (HOClO), chloric acid (HOClO_{2}) and perchloric acid (HOClO_{3}), and their respective conjugate bases are hypochlorite, chlorite, chlorate and perchlorate ions. This system has partially fallen out of use, but survives in the common names of many chemical compounds: the modern literature contains few references to "ferric chloride" (instead calling it "iron(III) chloride"), but names like "potassium permanganate" (instead of "potassium manganate(VII)") and "sulfuric acid" abound.

== Traditional naming ==
=== Simple ionic compounds ===
An ionic compound is named by its cation followed by its anion. See polyatomic ion for a list of possible ions.

For cations that take on multiple charges, the charge is written using Roman numerals in parentheses immediately following the element name. For example, Cu(NO_{3})_{2} is copper(II) nitrate, because the charge of two nitrate ions (NO^{−}_{3}) is 2 × −1 = −2, and since the net charge of the ionic compound must be zero, the Cu ion has a 2+ charge. This compound is therefore copper(II) nitrate. In the case of cations with a +4 oxidation state, the only acceptable format for the Roman numeral 4 is IV and not IIII.

The Roman numerals in fact show the oxidation number, but in simple ionic compounds (i.e., not metal complexes) this will always equal the ionic charge on the metal. For a simple overview see, for more details see selected pages from IUPAC rules for naming inorganic compounds.

==== List of common ion names ====
Monatomic anions:

Cl^{−} chloride
S^{2−} sulfide
P^{3−} phosphide

Polyatomic ions:

NH^{+}_{4} ammonium
H_{3}O^{+} hydronium
NO^{−}_{3} nitrate
NO^{−}_{2} nitrite
ClO^{−} hypochlorite
ClO^{−}_{2} chlorite
ClO^{−}_{3} chlorate
ClO^{−}_{4} perchlorate
SO^{2−}_{3} sulfite
SO^{2−}_{4} sulfate
S_{2}O^{2–}_{3} thiosulfate
HSO^{−}_{3} hydrogen sulfite (or bisulfite)
HCO^{−}_{3} hydrogen carbonate (or bicarbonate)
CO^{2−}_{3} carbonate
PO^{3−}_{4} phosphate
HPO^{2−}_{4} hydrogen phosphate
H_{2}PO^{−}_{4} dihydrogen phosphate
CrO^{2−}_{4} chromate
Cr_{2}O^{2−}_{7} dichromate
BO^{3−}_{3} borate
AsO^{3−}_{4} arsenate
C_{2}O^{2−}_{4} oxalate
CN^{−} cyanide
SCN^{−} thiocyanate
MnO^{−}_{4} permanganate

=== Hydrates ===
Hydrates are ionic compounds that have absorbed water. They are named as the ionic compound followed by a numerical prefix and -hydrate. The numerical prefixes used are listed below (see IUPAC numerical multiplier):

1. mono-
2. di-
3. tri-
4. tetra-
5. penta-
6. hexa-
7. hepta-
8. octa-
9. nona-
10. deca-

For example, CuSO_{4}·5H_{2}O is "copper(II) sulfate pentahydrate".

=== Molecular compounds ===
Inorganic molecular compounds are named with a prefix (see list above) before each element. The more electronegative element is written last and with an -ide suffix. For example, H_{2}O (water) can be called dihydrogen monoxide. Organic molecules do not follow this rule. In addition, the prefix mono- is not used with the first element; for example, SO_{2} is sulfur dioxide, not "monosulfur dioxide". Sometimes prefixes are shortened when the ending vowel of the prefix "conflicts" with a starting vowel in the compound. This simplifies pronunciation; for example, CO is "carbon monoxide" (as opposed to "monooxide").

==== Common exceptions ====
The "a" of the penta- prefix is not dropped before a vowel. As the IUPAC Red Book 2005 (page 69) states, "The final vowels of multiplicative prefixes should not be elided (although 'monoxide', rather than 'monooxide', is an allowed exception because of general usage)."

There are a number of exceptions and special cases that violate the above rules. Sometimes the prefix is left off the initial atom, even if there is more than one of that atom in the chemical formula: I_{2}O_{5} is known as iodine pentaoxide, but it should be called diiodine pentaoxide. N_{2}O_{3} is sometimes called nitrogen sesquioxide (sesqui- means 1 1/2), although that is not the IUPAC name.

The main oxide of phosphorus is often called phosphorus pentaoxide. It should actually be diphosphorus pentaoxide, but it is assumed that there are two phosphorus atoms (P_{2}O_{5}), as they are needed in order to balance the oxidation numbers of the five oxygen atoms. However, it has long been known that the molecular formula of the compound is P_{4}O_{10}, not P_{2}O_{5}, yet it is not normally called tetraphosphorus decaoxide despite that being the IUPAC name.

In writing formulas, ammonia is NH_{3} even though nitrogen is more electronegative (in line with the convention used by IUPAC as detailed in Table VI of the red book). Likewise, methane is written as CH_{4} even though carbon is more electronegative (Hill system).

== Nomenclature of Inorganic Chemistry ==
The front cover of the 2005 edition of the Red Book

Nomenclature of Inorganic Chemistry, commonly referred to by chemists as the Red Book, is a collection of recommendations on IUPAC nomenclature, published at irregular intervals by the IUPAC. The last full edition was published in 2005, in both paper and electronic versions.

Published editions
Release year	Title	Publisher	ISBN
2005	Recommendations 2005 (Red Book)	RSC Publishing	0-85404-438-8
2001	Recommendations 2000 (Red Book II) (supplement)	RSC Publishing	0-85404-487-6
1990	Recommendations 1990 (Red Book I)	Blackwell	0-632-02494-1
1971	Definitive Rules 1970	Butterworth	0-408-70168-4
1959	1957 Rules	Butterworth	
1940/1941	1940 Rules	Scientific journals	

== See also ==
- IUPAC Color Books
- IUPAC nomenclature
- IUPAC nomenclature of organic chemistry
- List of inorganic compounds
- Water of crystallization
