= Nomenclature of Organic Chemistry =

Book describing the nomenclature of organic compounds

- Hardcover 2013 edition
- Author: International Union of Pure and Applied Chemistry
- Language: English
- Subject: Chemistry
- Genre: Reference work
- Publisher: Royal Society of Chemistry
- Publication date: 1979 (1st edition)
- Publication place: United Kingdom
- Media type: Print
- Pages: 1612 pages
- ISBN: 978-0854041824

Nomenclature of Organic Chemistry, commonly referred to by chemists as the Blue Book, is a collection of recommendations on organic chemical nomenclature published at irregular intervals by the International Union of Pure and Applied Chemistry (IUPAC). A full edition was published in 1979, an abridged and updated version of which was published in 1993 as A Guide to IUPAC Nomenclature of Organic Compounds. Both of these are now out-of-print in their paper versions, but are available free of charge in electronic versions. After the release of a draft version for public comment in 2004 and the publication of several revised sections in the journal Pure and Applied Chemistry, a fully revised edition was published in print in 2013 and its online version is also available.
