= -ol =

Suffix in organic chemistry

Structure of the hydroxyl (-OH) functional group.

The suffix –ol is used in organic chemistry principally to form names of organic compounds containing the hydroxyl (–OH) group, mainly alcohols. The suffix was extracted from the word alcohol.

The suffix also appears in some trivial names with reference to oils (from Latin oleum, oil). Examples of this sense of the suffix include phenol, eugenol, urushiol, and menthol.

== Nomenclature ==
The IUPAC name of alcohols can derive from the following rules:

1. Identify the longest carbon chain, and number each carbon. Name the base alkane according to the organic nomenclature rules.
2. Identify the hydroxyl group and which carbon it is on. To be alcohol, the -OH must be bonded to a carbon.
3. Use the suffix -ol to denote which carbon the alcohol group is on. A three-carbon chain with the -OH on the second carbon would be propan-2-ol. Note that in some instances, common names are better.
4. If the -OH is on the end of the chain, or the carbon chain is only 1 or 2, use no number.
5. Use standard Greek prefixes to name molecules with two or more -OH groups (di- for 2, and so on).

== Examples ==
- Methanol
- Ethanol
- Isopropanol
- Phenol
- Erythritol
- Glycol
- t-Butyl alcohol

== Bibliography ==
- International Union of Pure and Applied Chemistry, Commission on Nomenclature of Organic Chemistry (1993). Panico R; Powell WH; Richer JC (eds.). A guide to IUPAC nomenclature of organic compounds: recommendations 1993. Oxford: Blackwell Scientific Publications. ISBN 0-632-03702-4.
