= -oate =

Suffix used in organic chemistry

The suffix -oate is the IUPAC nomenclature used in organic chemistry to form names of compounds formed with ester. They are of two types:

- Formed by replacing the hydrogen atom in the –COOH by some other radical, usually an alkyl or aryl radical forming an ester. For example, methyl benzoate is a molecular compound with the structure C_{6}H_{5}–CO–O–CH_{3}, and its condensed structural formula usually written as C_{6}H_{5}COOCH_{3}.
- Formed by removing the hydrogen atom in the –COOH, producing an anion, which joins with a cation forming a salt. For example, the sodium benzoate is an ionic compound with the structure C_{6}H_{5}–CO–O^{−} Na^{+}, and its condensed structural formula usually written as C_{6}H_{5}CO_{2}Na.

== Name ==
The suffix comes from "-oic acid".

== Usage ==
The most common examples of compounds named with the "oate" suffix are esters, like ethyl ethanoate, CH_{3}COOCH_{2}CH_{3}.
