= -one =

Suffix used in organic chemistry

The suffix -one is used in organic chemistry to form names of organic compounds containing the -C(=O)- group: see ketone. Sometimes a number between hyphens is inserted before it to state which atom the =O atom is attached to. This suffix was extracted from the word acetone. The final "-e" disappears if it is followed by another suffix that starts with a vowel.

In IUPAC nomenclature for ketones, the suffix -one replaces the terminal "-e" of the corresponding alkane name and may be preceded by a locant number indicating the carbon position of the carbonyl group in the chain. This system allows unambiguous identification of the compound’s structure, particularly in longer or branched carbon chains, where multiple carbonyl positions are possible.
