= IUPAC numerical multiplier =

Value in chemical nomenclature

Number	Multiplier	Number	Multiplier
1	mono-	30	triaconta-
2	di-	31	hentriaconta-
3	tri-	32	dotriaconta-
4	tetra-	33	tritriaconta-
5	penta-	34	tetratriaconta-
6	hexa-	40	tetraconta-
7	hepta-	50	pentaconta-
8	octa-	60	hexaconta-
9	nona-	70	heptaconta-
10	deca-	80	octaconta-
11	undeca-	90	nonaconta-
12	dodeca-	100	hecta-
13	trideca-	200	dicta-
14	tetradeca-	300	tricta-
15	pentadeca-	400	tetracta-
16	hexadeca-	500	pentacta-
17	heptadeca-	600	hexacta-
18	octadeca-	700	heptacta-
19	nonadeca-	800	octacta-
20	icosa-	900	nonacta-
21	henicosa-	1000	kilia-
22	docosa-	2000	dilia-
23	tricosa-	3000	trilia-
24	tetracosa-	4000	tetralia-
25	pentacosa-	5000	pentalia-
26	hexacosa-	6000	hexalia-
27	heptacosa-	7000	heptalia-
28	octacosa-	8000	octalia-
29	nonacosa-	9000	nonalia-

The numerical multiplier (or multiplying affix) in IUPAC nomenclature indicates how many particular atoms or functional groups are attached at a particular point in a molecule. The affixes are derived from both Latin and Greek.

== Compound affixes ==
The prefixes are given from the least significant decimal digit up: units, then tens, then hundreds, then thousands. For example:

548 → octa- (8) + tetraconta- (40) + pentacta- (500) = octatetracontapentacta-
9267 → hepta- (7) + hexaconta- (60) + dicta- (200) + nonalia- (9000) = heptahexacontadictanonalia-

=== The numeral one ===
While the use of the affix mono- is rarely necessary in organic chemistry, it is often essential in inorganic chemistry to avoid ambiguity: carbon oxide could refer to either carbon monoxide or carbon dioxide. In forming compound affixes, the numeral one is represented by the term hen- except when it forms part of the number eleven (undeca-): hence

241 → hen- (1) + tetraconta- (40) + dicta- (200) = hentetracontadicta-
411 → undeca- (11) + tetracta- (400) = undecatetracta-

=== The numeral two ===
In compound affixes, the numeral two is represented by do- except when it forms part of the numbers 20 (icosa-), 200 (dicta-) or 2000 (dilia-).

== Icosa- v. eicosa- ==
IUPAC prefers the spelling icosa- for the affix corresponding to the number twenty on the grounds of etymology. However both the Chemical Abstracts Service and the Beilstein database use the alternative spelling eicosa-.

== Other numerical prefix types ==
There are two more types of numerical prefixes in IUPAC organic chemistry nomenclature.

=== Numerical terms for compound or complex features ===
Numerical prefixes for multiplication of compound or complex (as in complicated) features are created by adding kis to the basic numerical prefix, with the exception of numbers 2 and 3, which are bis- and tris-, respectively.

Number	Multiplier
2	bis-
3	tris-
4	tetrakis-
...

An example is the IUPAC name for DDT (1,1,1-Trichloro-bis-2,2(4-chlorophenyl)ethane).

=== Multiplicative prefixes for naming assemblies of identical units ===
Number	Multiplier
3	ter-
5	quinque-
6	sexi-
7	septi-
8	octi-
9	novi-
10	deci-
11–9999	Ending "a" in the basic numerical prefix is replaced with "i", and/or "deka" is replaced with "deci".

Examples are biphenyl or terphenyl.

== Etymology ==
"mono-" is from Greek monos = "alone". "un" = 1 and "nona-" = 9 are from Latin. The others are derived from Greek numbers.

The forms 100 and upwards are not correct Greek. In Ancient Greek, hekaton = 100, diakosioi = 200, triakosioi = 300, etc. The numbers 200-900 would be confused easily with 22 to 29 if they were used in chemistry.

khīlioi = 1000, diskhīlioi = 2000, triskhīlioi = 3000, etc.

13 to 19 are formed by starting with the Greek word for the number of ones, followed by και (the Greek word for 'and'), followed by δέκα (the Greek word for 'ten'). For instance treiskaideka, as in triskaidekaphobia.

== Notes and references ==
- Panico, R. & Powell, W. H., eds. (1994). A Guide to IUPAC Nomenclature of Organic Compounds 1993. Oxford: Blackwell Science. ISBN 0-632-03488-2.
