= Polyyne =

Any organic compound with alternating C–C and C≡C bonds

Diacetylene, the simplest polyyne

A polyyne (Note: /ˈpɒliaɪn/ POL-ee-yne) is any organic compound with alternating single and triple bonds; that is, a series of consecutive alkynes, (−C≡C−)_{n} with n greater than 1. These compounds are also called polyacetylenes, especially in the natural products and chemical ecology literature, even though this nomenclature more properly refers to acetylene polymers composed of alternating single and double bonds (which are polyenes) (−CR=CR′−)_{n} with n greater than 1. They are also sometimes referred to as oligoynes, (Note: /ˈɒləɡoʊaɪn/ OL-ə-goh-yne, also /əˈlɪɡoʊaɪn/ ə-LIG-oh-yne) or carbinoids after "carbyne" (−C≡C−)_{∞}, the hypothetical allotrope of carbon that would be the ultimate member of the series. The synthesis of this substance has been claimed several times since the 1960s, but those reports have been disputed. Indeed, the substances identified as short chains of "carbyne" in many early organic synthesis attempts would be called polyynes today.

The simplest polyyne is diacetylene or butadiyne, H−C≡C−C≡C−H. Along with cumulenes, polyynes are distinguished from other organic chains by their rigidity and high conductivity, both of which make them promising as wires in molecular nanotechnology. Polyynes have been detected in interstellar molecular clouds where hydrogen is scarce.

== Synthesis ==
The first reported synthesis of a polyyne was performed in 1869 by Carl Andreas Glaser, who observed that copper phenylacetylide (CuC≡C−C_{6}H_{5}) undergoes oxidative dimerization in the presence of air to produce diphenylbutadiyne (C_{6}H_{5}−C≡C−C≡C−C_{6}H_{5}).

Interest in these compounds has stimulated research into their preparation by organic synthesis by several general routes. As a main synthetic tool usually acetylene homocoupling reactions like the Glaser coupling or its associated Elinton and Hay protocols are used. Moreover, many of such procedures involve a Cadiot–Chodkiewicz coupling or similar reactions to unite two separate alkyne building-blocks or by alkylation of a pre-formed polyyne unit. In addition to that, Fritsch–Buttenberg–Wiechell rearrangement was used as crucial step during the synthesis of the longest known polyyne (C_{44}). An elimination of chlorovinylsilanes was used as a final step in the synthesis of the longest known phenyl end-capped polyynes.

=== Organic and organosilicon polyynes ===
Using various techniques, polyynes H(−C≡C−)_{n}H with n up to 4 or 5 were synthesized during the 1950s. Around 1971, T. R. Johnson and D. R. M. Walton developed the use of end-caps of the form –SiR_{3}, where R was usually an ethyl group, to protect the polyyne chain during the chain-doubling reaction using Hay's catalyst (a copper(I)–TMEDA complex). With that technique they were able to obtain polyynes like (CH_{3}CH_{2})_{3}Si(−C≡C−)_{n}Si(CH_{2}CH_{3})_{3} with n up to 8 in pure state, and with n up to 16 in solution. Later Tykwinski and co-workers were able to obtain ((CH_{3})_{2}CH)_{3}Si(−C≡C−)_{n}Si(CH(CH_{3})_{2})_{3} polyynes with chain length up to C_{20}.

A polyyne compound with 10 acetylenic units (20 atoms), with the ends capped by Fréchet-type aromatic polyether dendrimers, was isolated and characterized in 2002. Moreover, the synthesis of dicyanopolyynes with up to 8 acetylenic units was reported. The longest phenyl end-capped polyynes were reported by Cox and co-workers in 2007. As of 2010, the polyyne with the longest chain yet isolated had 22 acetylenic units (44 carbon atoms), end-capped with tris(3,5-di-t-butylphenyl)methyl groups.

Alkynes with the formula H(−C≡C−)_{n}H and n from 2 to 6 can be detected in the decomposition products of partially oxidized copper(I) acetylide ((Cu^{+})_{2}(^{−}C≡C^{−}) (an acetylene derivative known since 1856 or earlier) by hydrochloric acid. A "carbonaceous" residue left by the decomposition also has the spectral signature of (−C≡C−)_{n} chains.

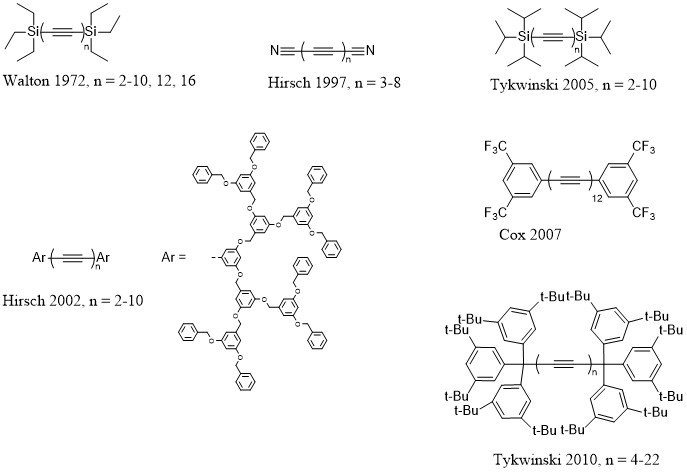
Organic and organosilicon polyynes

=== Organometallics ===
Organometallic polyynes capped with metal complexes are well characterized. As of the mid-2010s, the most intense research has concerned rhenium (Re(−C≡C−)_{n}Re, n = 3–10), ruthenium (RuRu(−C≡C−)_{n}RuRu, n = 4–10), iron (Fe(−C≡C−)_{6}Fe), platinum (Pt(−C≡C−)_{n}Pt, n = 8–14), palladium (Ar(−C≡C−)_{n}Pd, n = 3–5, Ar = aryl), and cobalt (Co_{3}C(−C≡C−)_{n}CCo_{3}, n = 7–13) complexes.

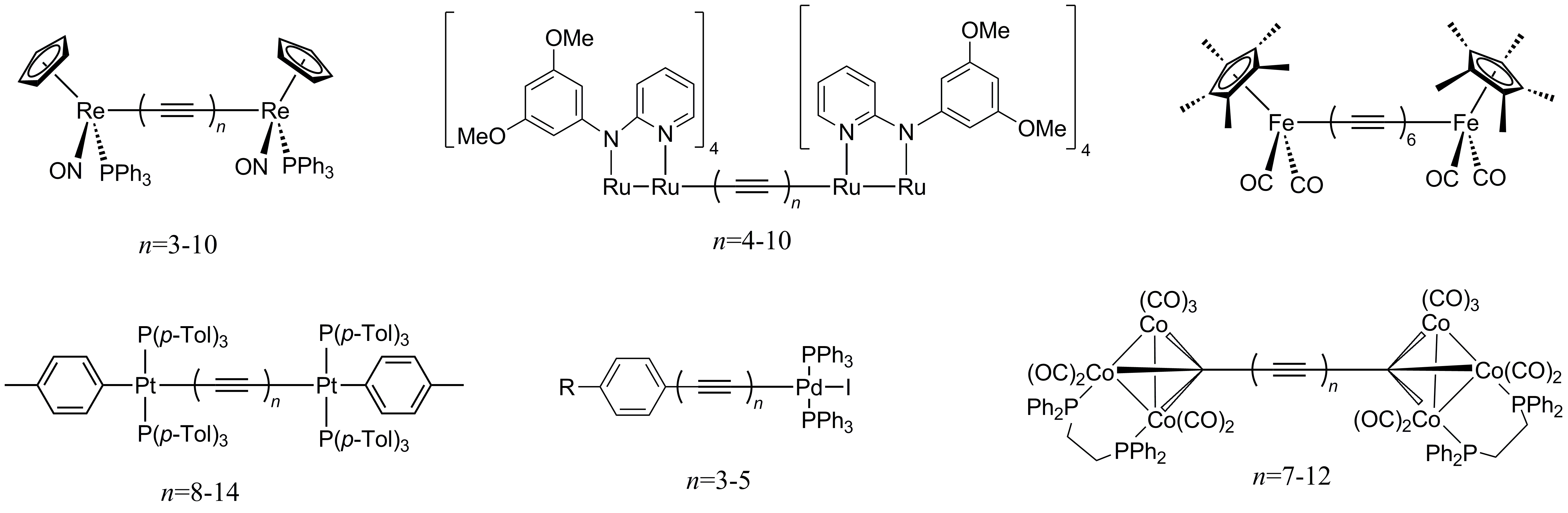
Examples of known organometallic polyynes.

== Stability ==
Long polyyne chains are said to be inherently unstable in bulk because they can cross-link with each other exothermically. Explosions are a real hazard in this area of research. They can be fairly stable, even against moisture and oxygen, if the end hydrogen atoms are replaced with a suitably inert end-group, such as tert-butyl or trifluoromethyl. Bulky end-groups, that can keep the chains apart, work especially well at stabilizing polyynes. In 1995 the preparation of carbyne chains with over 300 carbon atoms was reported using this technique. However the report has been contested by a claim that the detected molecules were fullerene-like structures rather than long polyynes.

Polyyne chains have also been stabilised to heating by co-deposition with silver nanoparticles, and by complexation with a mercury-containing tridentate Lewis acid to form layered adducts. Long polyyne chains encapsulated in double-walled carbon nanotubes or in the form of rotaxanes have also been shown to be stable. Despite rather low stability of longer polyynes there are some examples of their use as synthetic precursors in organic and organometallic synthesis.

== Structure ==
Synthetic polyynes of the form R(−C≡C−)_{n}R, with n about 8 or more, often have a smoothly curved or helical backbone in the crystalline solid state, presumably due to crystal packing effects. For example, when the cap R is triisopropylsilyl and n is 8, X-ray crystallography of the substance (a crystalline orange/yellow solid) shows the backbone bent by about 25–30 degrees in a broad arch, so that each C−C≡C angle deviates by 3.1 degrees from a straight line. This geometry affords a denser packing, with the bulky cap of an adjacent molecule nested into the concave side of the backbone. As a result, the distance between backbones of neighboring molecules is reduced to about 0.35 to 0.5 nm, near the range at which one expects spontaneous cross-linking. The compound is stable indefinitely at low temperature, but decomposes before melting. In contrast, the homologous molecules with n = 4 or n = 5 have nearly straight backbones that stay at least 0.5 to 0.7 nm apart, and melt without decomposing.

== Occurrence ==
=== Biological origins ===
A wide range of organisms synthesize polyynes. These chemicals have various biological activities, including as flavorings and pigments, chemical repellents and toxins, and potential application to biomedical research and pharmaceuticals. In plants, polyynes are found mainly in the euasterids, especially in the sunflower, carrot, ginseng and bellflower families. However, they can also be found in some members of the tomato, olax, and sandalwood families. The earliest polyyne to be isolated was dehydromatricaria ester (DME) in 1826; however, it was not fully characterized until later.

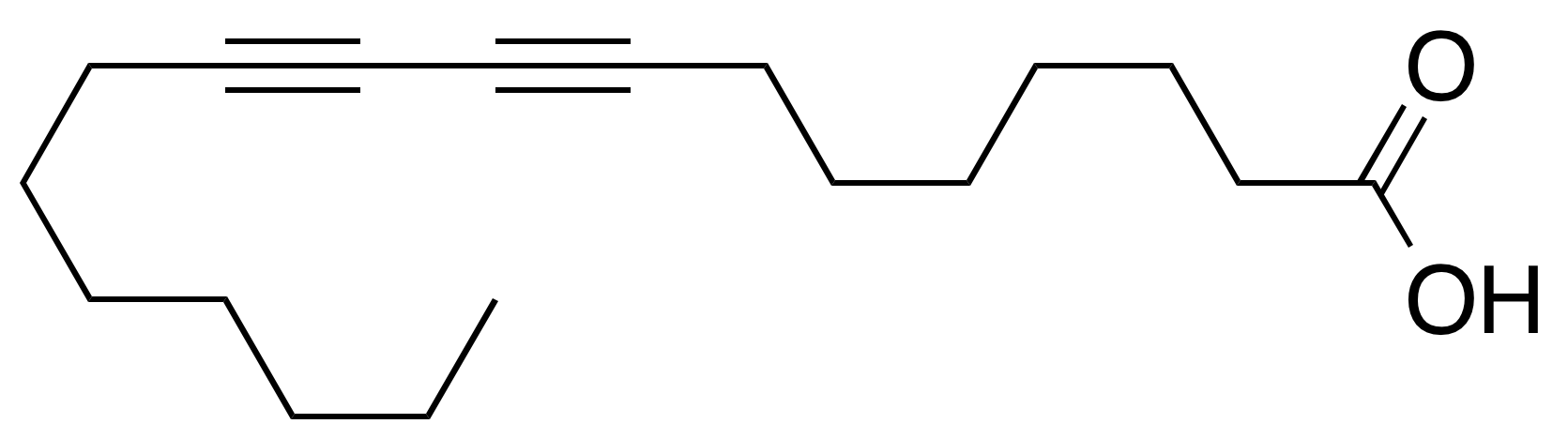
8,10-Octadecadiynoic acid

The simple fatty acid 8,10-octadecadiynoic acid is isolated from the root bark of the legume Paramacrolobium coeruleum of the family Caesalpiniaceae and has been investigated as a photopolymerizable unit in synthetic phospholipids.

Thiarubrine B

Thiarubrine B is the most prevalent among several related light-sensitive pigments that have been isolated from the giant ragweed (Ambrosia trifida), a plant used in herbal medicine. The thiarubrines have antibiotic, antiviral, and nematocidal activity, and activity against HIV-1 that is mediated by exposure to light.

Falcarindiol

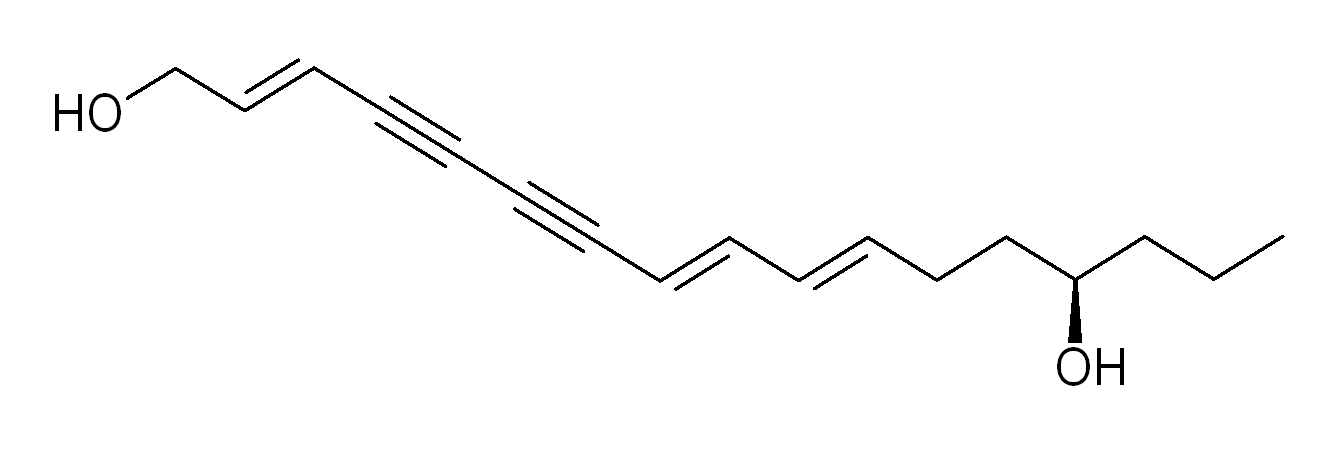
Oenanthotoxin

Cicutoxin

Polyynes such as falcarindiol can be found in Apiaceae vegetables like carrot, celery, fennel, parsley and parsnip where they show cytotoxic activities. Aliphatic C_{17}-polyynes of the falcarinol type were described to act as metabolic modulators and are studied as potential health-promoting nutraceuticals. Falcarindiol is the main compound responsible for bitterness in carrots, and is the most active among several polyynes with potential anticancer activity found in Devil's club (Oplopanax horridus). Other polyynes from plants include oenanthotoxin and cicutoxin, which are poisons found in water dropwort (Oenanthe spp.) and water hemlock (Cicuta spp.).

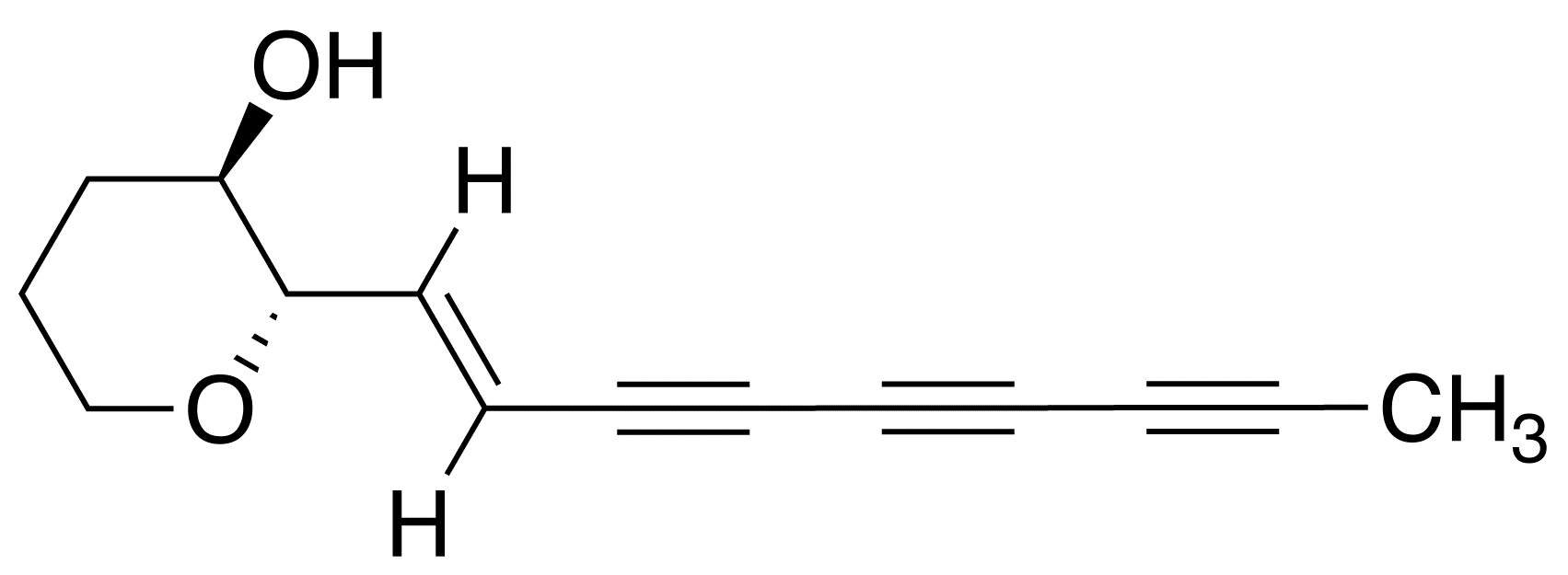
Ichthyothereol

Ichthyothere is a genus of plants whose active constituent is a polyyne called ichthyothereol. This compound is highly toxic to fish and mammals. Ichthyothere terminalis leaves have traditionally been used to make poisoned bait by indigenous peoples of the lower Amazon basin.

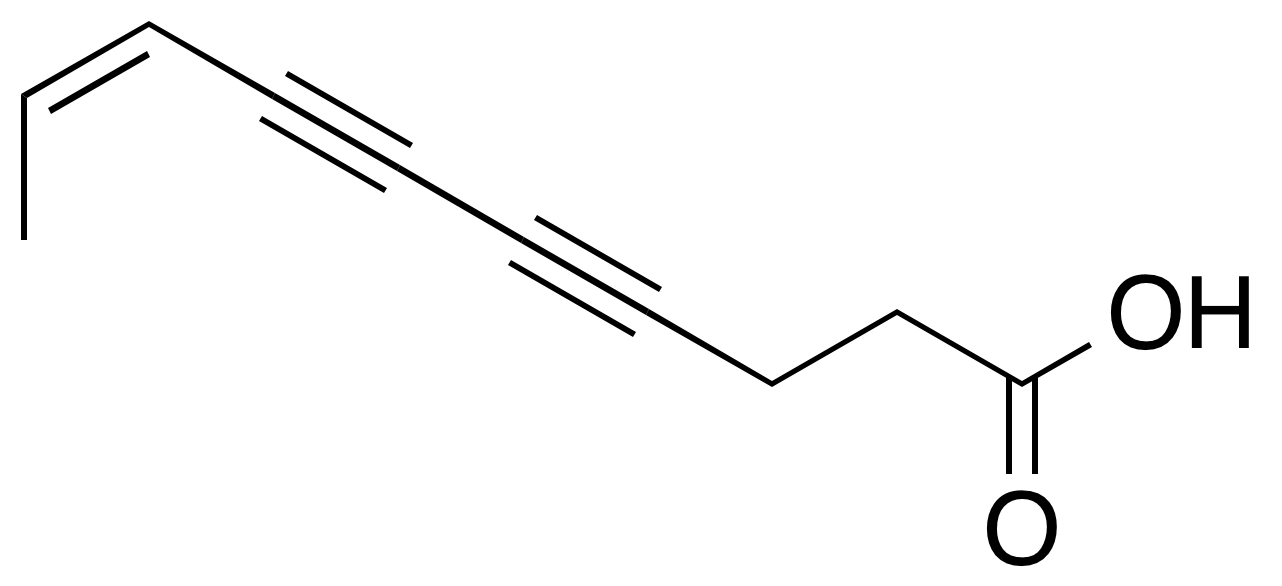
Z-Dihydromatricaria acid

Dihydromatricaria acid is a polyyne produced and secreted by soldier beetles as a chemical defense.

=== In space ===
The octatetraynyl radicals and hexatriynyl radicals together with their ions are detected in space where hydrogen is rare. Moreover, there have been claims that polyynes have been found in astronomical impact sites on Earth as part of the mineral chaoite, but this interpretation has been contested. See Astrochemistry.

== See also ==
- Cyanopolyyne
- Enediyne
- Enyne
- Isanolic acid
- Polyene
