= Taber's reagent =

Names
- IUPAC name Dimethyl 1-diazo-2-oxo-2-phenylethylphosphonate

Identifiers
CAS Number	60190-80-9
3D model (JSmol)	Interactive image
ChemSpider	9207594
PubChem CID	71374237
CompTox Dashboard (EPA)	DTXSID10797030
- InChI: InChI=1S/C10H11N2O4P/c1-15-17(14,16-2)10(12-11)9(13)8-6-4-3-5-7-8/h3-7H,1-2H3 Key: ALULPXVSKVPGCZ-UHFFFAOYSA-N
- SMILES: COP(=O)(C(=[N+]=[N-])C(=O)C1=CC=CC=C1)OC

Properties
Chemical formula	C_{10}H_{11}N_{2}O_{4}
Molar mass	223.208 g·mol^{−1}
Appearance	Thick, yellow oil.
- Except where otherwise noted, data are given for materials in their standard state (at 25 °C [77 °F], 100 kPa). Infobox references

Taber’s reagent is a diazo-phosphonate used for the one carbon homologation of an aldehyde to the alkyne which is next in the homologous series. Taber’s reagent allows this reaction to occur under ambient conditions, at a large scale, and at a lower cost relative to similar reagents. The reagent was discovered by Douglass F. Taber et al in 2008

== Synthesis ==
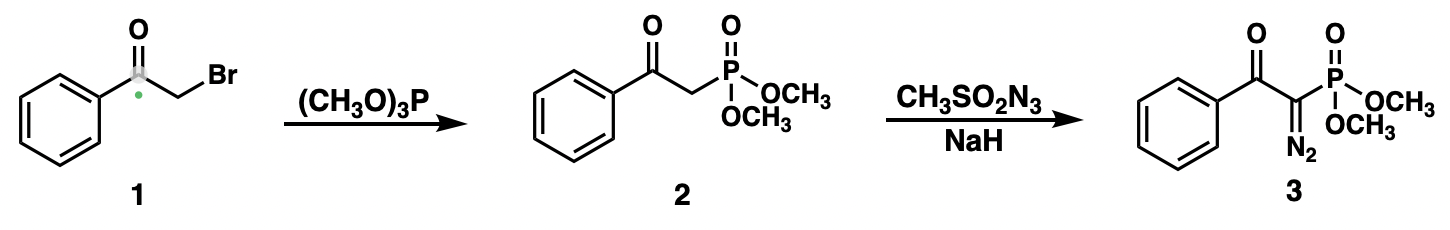
Scheme 1.

Scheme 1 shows the synthesis reported by Taber et al starting from readily commercially available 2-bromoacetophenone (1). An addition of trimethyl phosphite to 1 yielded phosphonate 2, which can be purified by distillation to obtain the desired reagent (3). Taber’s reagent has a larger acyl group than the structurally similar Bestmann-Ohira reagent, making its synthesis easier and less expensive.

== Reactions and uses ==
The primary use of Taber's reagent is the homologation of aldehydes to terminal alkynes. It is very similar, both structurally and in its usage, to the Ohira-Bestmann reagent which is used for the same chemical process of aldehyde to alkyne homologation. Taber's reagent was created as an alternative to the Ohira-Bestmann reagent since its precursor, dimethyl 2-oxopropylphosphonate, is very expensive, which prevents large-scale reactions.

Structurally, Taber's reagent is almost identical to the Ohira-Bestmann reagent, but with a bulkier acyl group (phenyl group as opposed to methyl group) on the end. This modification is possible since the acyl group is lost before the diazo phosphonate (Taber's reagent in this case) reacts with the aldehyde.

Taber's reagent is also useful in comparison to other, similar reagents because it requires no purification after extraction. Additionally, it is inexpensive to make which allows for cheap, large scale reactions. This is pertinent since fast reactions (click chemistry) has become more popular, making a reaction of this type for creating terminal alkynes necessary

The Taber reagent works on primary, secondary, and tertiary aldehydes. Examples of aldehyde to terminal alkyne homologations using the taber reagent are shown.

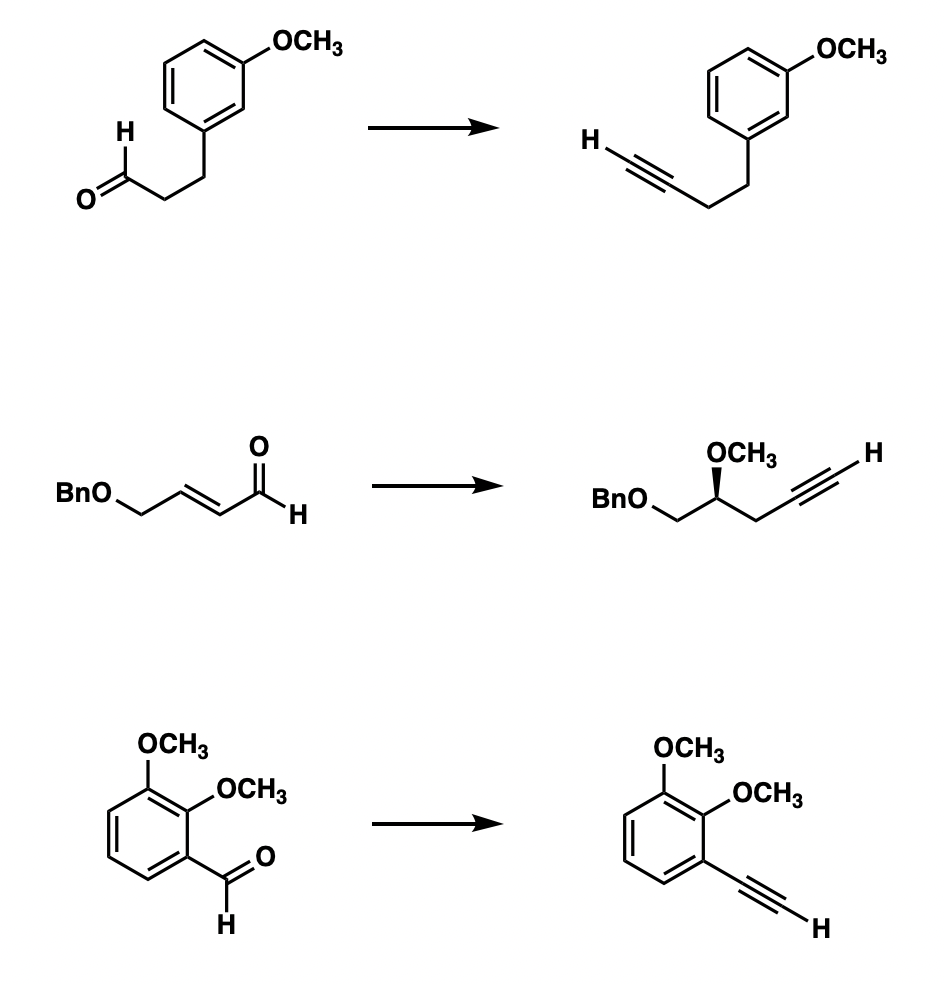
The experimental work of Taber et al., showing the efficacy of Taber's reagent in changing primary, secondary, and tertiary aldehydes into alkynes.

== Activity and reaction mechanism ==
Because it is almost structurally identical to other reagents in homologations, and because the acyl group of the compound does not influence the reaction mechanism, the transformation of aldehydes to alkynes by Taber's reagent is akin to that done in Seyferth-Gilbert homologation. The Seyferth-Gilbert reaction notably uses the Seyferth Gilbert reagent and the Ohira-Bestmann reagent.
