= Ethynyl group =

In organic chemistry, an ethynyl group is a functional group with the formula −C≡CH, representing an acetylene molecule with one fewer hydrogen atom.

- Ethynyl group (HC≡C–), also designated as an acetylenic group (from acetylene), is referred to in IUPAC chemical nomenclature with the -yne suffix. It is sometimes designated as ethinyl in compounds such as ethinylestradiol and ethisterone (ethinyltestosterone). See main page alkynes.

== See also ==
- Ethynylation
- Ethynyl radical
- Propynyl (H_{3}C–C≡C–R, 1-propynyl group; or HC≡C–CH_{2}–R, 2-propynyl group, Propargyl)
