= Alkyne =

Hydrocarbon compound containing one or more C≡C bonds

$\ce{H-C#C} \ce{-H}$

Acetylene

$\ce{H-C#C}{-} \ce{\overset{\displaystyle{H} \atop |}{\underset{| \atop \displaystyle{H}}C}} \ce{-H}$

Propyne

$\ce{H-C#C}{-} \ce{\overset{\displaystyle{H} \atop |}{\underset{| \atop \displaystyle{H}}C}}{-} \ce{\overset{\displaystyle{H} \atop |}{\underset{| \atop \displaystyle{H}}C}} \ce{-H}$

1-Butyne

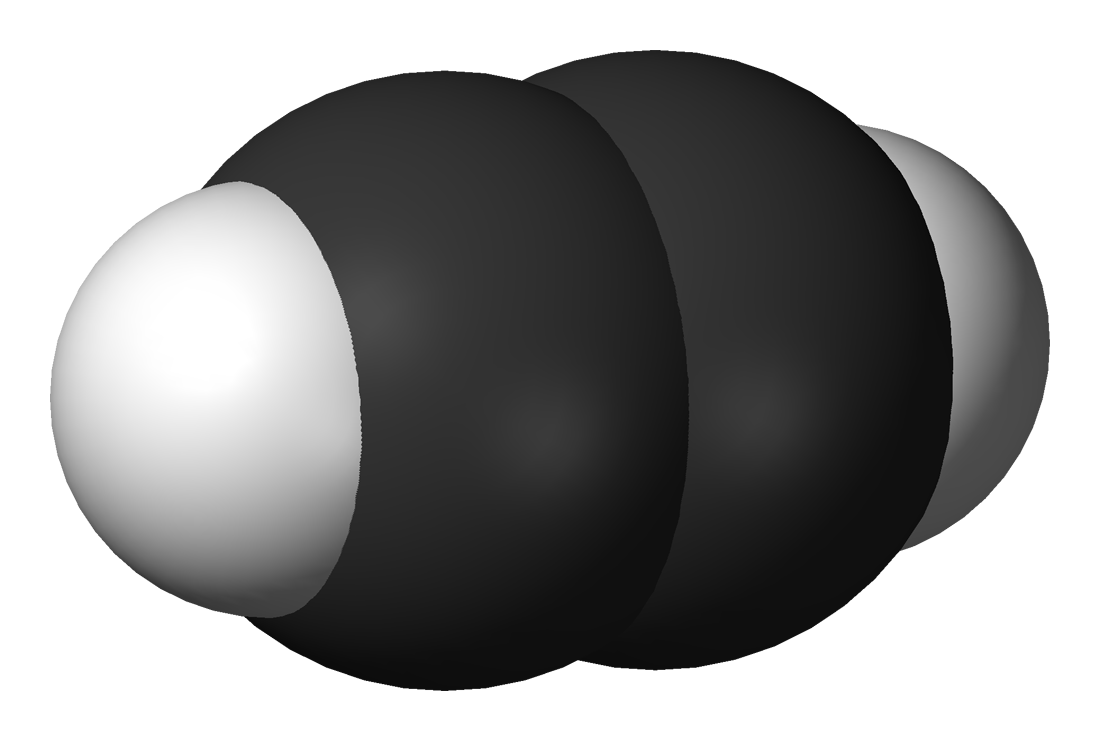
A 3D model of ethyne (acetylene), the simplest alkyne

In organic chemistry, an alkyne is an unsaturated hydrocarbon containing at least one carbon—carbon triple bond. The simplest acyclic alkynes with only one triple bond and no other functional groups form a homologous series with the general chemical formula C_{n}H_{2n−2}. Alkynes are traditionally known as acetylenes, although the name acetylene also refers specifically to C_{2}H_{2}, known formally as ethyne using IUPAC nomenclature. Like other hydrocarbons, alkynes are generally hydrophobic.

== Structure and bonding ==
In acetylene, the H–C≡C bond angles are 180°. By virtue of this bond angle, alkynes are rod-like. Correspondingly, cyclic alkynes are rare due to bond strain. As such, benzyne cannot be isolated.

The C≡C bond distance of 118 picometers (for C_{2}H_{2}) is much shorter than the C=C distance in alkenes (132 pm, for C_{2}H_{4}) or the C–C bond in alkanes (153 pm).

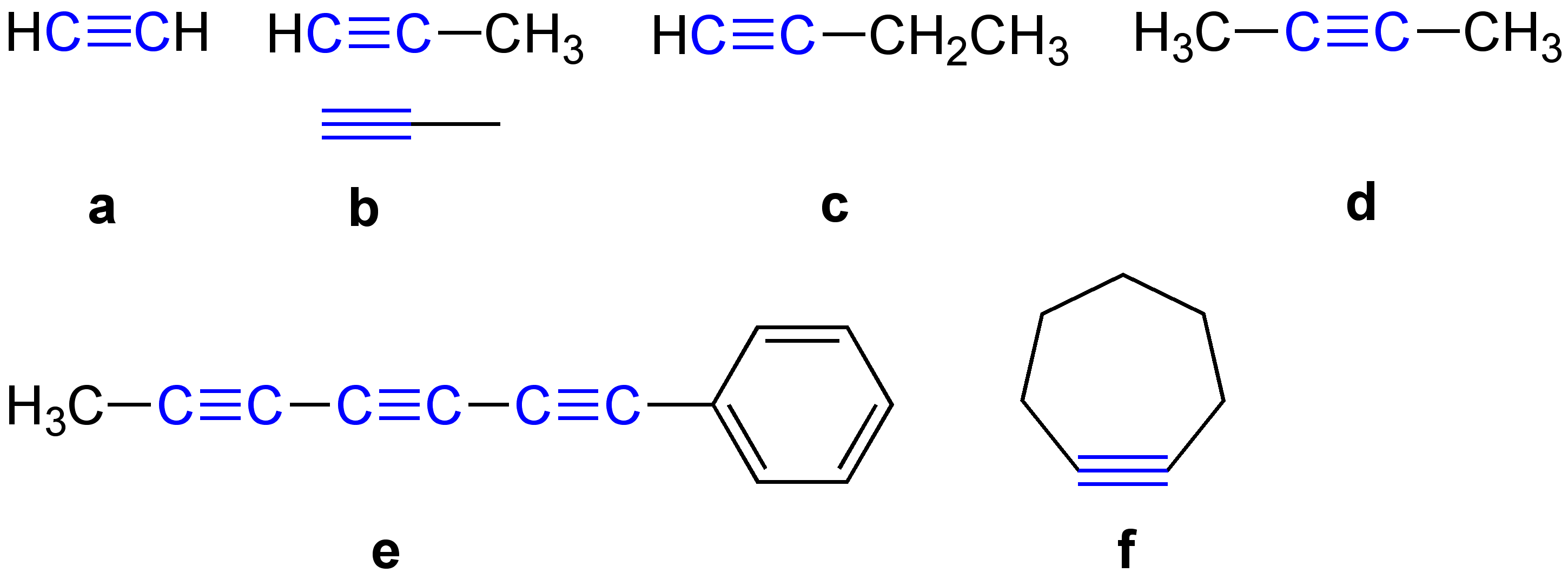
Illustrative alkynes: a, acetylene, b, two depictions of propyne, c, 1-butyne, d, 2-butyne, e, the naturally occurring 1-phenylhepta-1,3,5-triyne, and f, the strained cycloheptyne. Triple bonds are highlighted blue.

The triple bond is very strong with a bond strength of 839 kJ/mol. The sigma bond contributes 369 kJ/mol, the two pi bonds contribute 268 kJ/mol and 202 kJ/mol. Bonding is usually discussed in the context of molecular orbital theory, which recognizes triple bond arising from the overlap of s and p orbitals. In terms of valence bond theory, the carbon atoms in an alkyne bond are sp hybridized which means they each have two unhybridized p orbitals and two sp hybrid orbitals. Overlap of an sp orbital from each atom forms one sp–sp sigma bond. Each p orbital on one atom overlaps one on the other atom, forming two pi bonds, giving a total of three bonds. The remaining sp orbital on each atom can form a sigma bond to another atom (e.g., to hydrogen atoms in the parent acetylene). The two sp orbitals project on opposite sides of the carbon atom.

=== Terminal and internal alkynes ===
Internal alkynes feature carbon substituents on each acetylenic carbon. Symmetrical examples include diphenylacetylene and 3-hexyne. They may also be asymmetrical, such as in 2-pentyne.

Terminal alkynes have the formula RC≡CH, where at least one end of the alkyne is a hydrogen atom. An example is methylacetylene (propyne using IUPAC nomenclature). They are often prepared by alkylation of monosodium acetylide. Terminal alkynes, like acetylene itself, are mildly acidic, with pK_{a} values of around 25. They are far more acidic than alkenes and alkanes, which have pK_{a} values of around 40 and 50, respectively. The acidic hydrogen on terminal alkynes can be replaced by a variety of groups resulting in halo-, silyl-, and alkoxoalkynes. The carbanions generated by deprotonation of terminal alkynes are called acetylides. Internal alkynes are also considerably more acidic than alkenes and alkanes, though not nearly as acidic as terminal alkynes. The C–H bonds at the α position of alkynes (propargylic C–H bonds) can also be deprotonated using strong bases, with an estimated pK_{a} of 35. This acidity can be used to isomerize internal alkynes to terminal alkynes using the alkyne zipper reaction.

== Isomerism ==
Alkynes having four or more carbon atoms can form different structural isomers by having the triple bond in different positions or having some of the carbon atoms be substituents rather than part of the parent chain. Other non-alkyne structural isomers are also possible.

- C_{2}H_{2}: acetylene only
- C_{3}H_{4}: propyne only
- C_{4}H_{6}: 2 isomers: 1-butyne, and 2-butyne
- C_{5}H_{8}: 3 isomers: 1-pentyne, 2-pentyne, and 3-methyl-1-butyne
- C_{6}H_{10}: 7 isomers: 1-hexyne, 2-hexyne, 3-hexyne, 4-methyl-1-pentyne, 4-methyl-2-pentyne, 3-methyl-1-pentyne, 3,3-dimethyl-1-butyne

== Naming alkynes ==
In systematic chemical nomenclature, alkynes are named with the Greek prefix system without any additional letters. Examples include ethyne or octyne. In parent chains with four or more carbons, it is necessary to say where the triple bond is located. For octyne, one can either write 3-octyne or oct-3-yne when the bond starts at the third carbon. The lowest number possible is given to the triple bond. When no superior functional groups are present, the parent chain must include the triple bond even if it is not the longest possible carbon chain in the molecule. Ethyne is commonly called by its trivial name acetylene.

In chemistry, the suffix -yne is used to denote the presence of a triple bond. In organic chemistry, the suffix often follows IUPAC nomenclature. However, inorganic compounds featuring unsaturation in the form of triple bonds may be denoted by substitutive nomenclature with the same methods used with alkynes (i.e. the name of the corresponding saturated compound is modified by replacing the "-ane" ending with "-yne"). "-diyne" is used when there are two triple bonds, and so on. In case of multiple triple bonds, the position of unsaturation is indicated by a numerical locant immediately preceding the "-yne" suffix, or 'locants'. Locants are chosen so that the numbers are low as possible. "-yne" is also used as a suffix to name substituent groups that are triply bound to the parent compound.

Sometimes a number between hyphens is inserted before it to state which atoms the triple bond is between. This suffix arose as a collapsed form of the end of the word "acetylene". The final "-e" disappears if it is followed by another suffix that starts with a vowel.

== Synthesis ==
=== From calcium carbide ===
Classically, acetylene was prepared by hydrolysis (protonation) of calcium carbide (Ca^{2+}[:C≡C:]^{2–}):

$$\ce{Ca^{2+}[C#C]^2- + 2 HOH -> HC#CH + Ca^{2+}[(HO^{-})2]}$$

which was in turn synthesized by combining quicklime and coke in an electric arc furnace at 2200 °C:

$$\ce{CaO + 3 C (amorphous) ->  CaC2 + CO}$$

This was an industrially important process which provided access to hydrocarbons from coal resources for countries like Germany and China. However, the energy-intensive nature of this process is a major disadvantage and its share of the world's production of acetylene has steadily decreased relative to hydrocarbon cracking.

=== Cracking ===
Commercially, the dominant alkyne is acetylene itself, which is used as a fuel and a precursor to other compounds, e.g., acrylates. Hundreds of millions of kilograms are produced annually by partial oxidation of natural gas:

$$\ce{4 CH4 + 3 O2 -> 2 HC#CH + 6 H2O}$$

Propyne, also industrially useful, is also prepared by thermal cracking of hydrocarbons.

=== Alkylation and arylation of terminal alkynes ===
Terminal alkynes (RC≡CH, including acetylene itself) can be deprotonated by bases like NaNH_{2}, BuLi, or EtMgBr to give acetylide anions (RC≡C:^{–}M^{+}, M = Na, Li, MgBr) which can be alkylated by addition to carbonyl groups (Favorskii reaction), ring opening of epoxides, or S_{N}2-type substitution of unhindered primary alkyl halides.

In the presence of transition metal catalysts, classically a combination of Pd(PPh_{3})_{2}Cl_{2} and CuI, terminal acetylenes (RC≡CH) can react with aryl iodides and bromides (ArI or ArBr) in the presence of a secondary or tertiary amine like Et_{3}N to give arylacetylenes (RC≡CAr) in the Sonogashira reaction.

The availability of these reliable reactions makes terminal alkynes useful building blocks for preparing internal alkynes.

=== Dehydrohalogenation and related reactions ===
Alkynes are prepared from 1,1- and 1,2-dihaloalkanes by double dehydrohalogenation. The reaction provides a means to generate alkynes from alkenes, which are first halogenated and then dehydrohalogenated. For example, phenylacetylene can be generated from styrene by bromination followed by treatment of the resulting of 1,2-dibromo-1-phenylethane with sodium amide in ammonia:

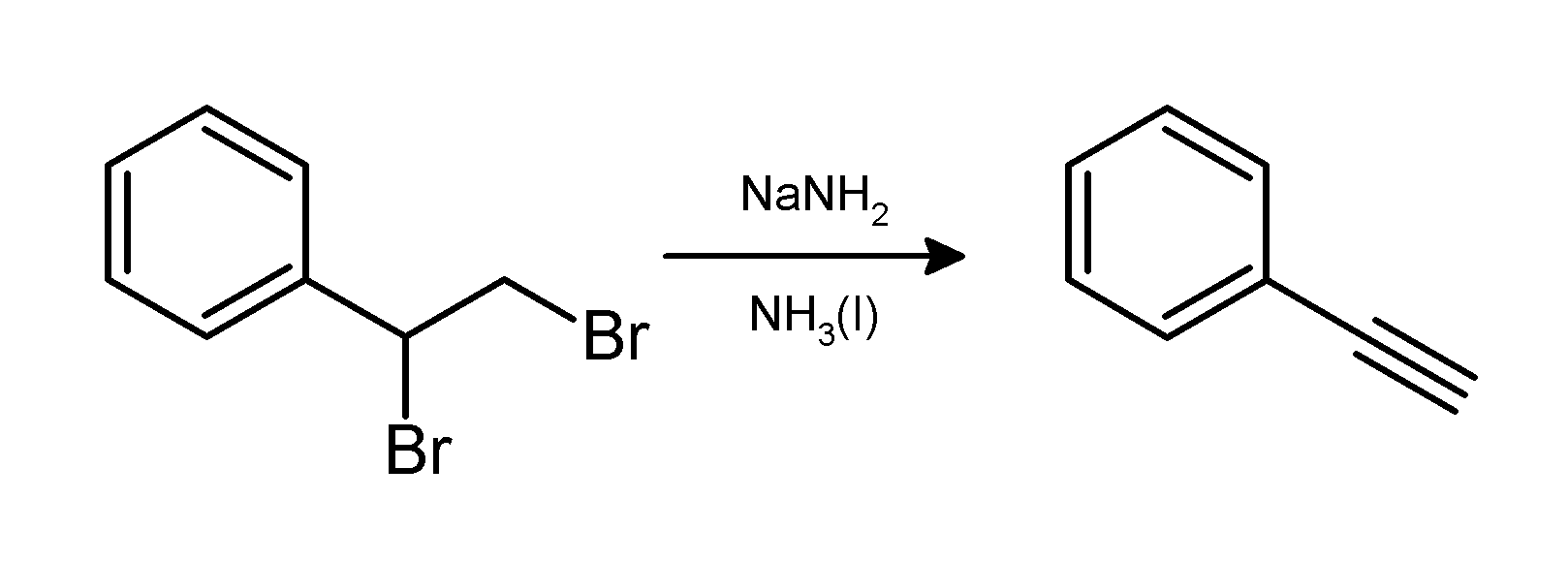

Via the Fritsch–Buttenberg–Wiechell rearrangement, alkynes are prepared from vinyl bromides. Alkynes can be prepared from aldehydes using the Corey–Fuchs reaction and from aldehydes or ketones by the Seyferth–Gilbert homologation.

Vinyl halides are susceptible to dehydrohalogenation.

=== Dehydrogenation of alkenes ===
Alkynes are readily accessible from alkenes by treatment with selenanthrene oxides.

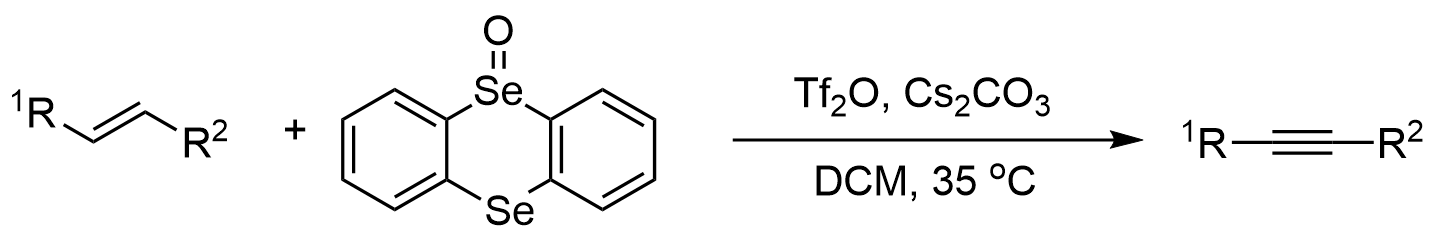

== Reactions and applications ==
Alkynes are a reactive functional group, and participate in many organic reactions. Their use in organic synthesis was pioneered by Ralph Raphael, who in 1955 wrote the first book describing their versatility as intermediates.

In spite of their kinetic stability (persistence) due to their strong triple bonds, alkynes are thermodynamically unstable, as can be gleaned from small alkynes' highly positive heats of formation. For example, acetylene has a heat of formation of +227.4 kJ/mol (+54.2 kcal/mol), indicating a much higher energy content than its constituent elements. Its exothermic combustion is exploited industrially in oxyacetylene welding. Other reactions involving alkynes are often highly thermodynamically favorable (exothermic/exergonic) for the same reason.

Being more unsaturated than alkenes, alkynes characteristically undergo reactions that show that they are "doubly unsaturated". They undergo addition reactions with radicals and polar reagents and cycloadditions. With metals, they can form metallacyclopropenes and undergo catalytic hydrogenation. Protonation can catalyze an addition reaction or isomerize them to allenes.

Alkynes are also somewhat electron-poor; terminal alkynes deprotonate easily. As a result, they have a rich acid-base and organometallic chemistry.

=== Additions ===
Besides hydrogenation, halogenation, and hydration (below), the addition of E−H bonds across C≡C is general for silanes, boranes, and related hydrides. The hydroboration of alkynes gives vinylic boranes which oxidize to the corresponding aldehyde or ketone.

In the thiol-yne reaction the adding reagent is a thiol.

==== Hydrogenation ====
Depending on catalysts and conditions, alkynes are capable of adding up to two equivalents of H_{2}:
$$\ce{RC#CR' + H2 ->} \text{ cis-}\ce{RCH=CR'H}$$
$$\ce{RCH=CR'H + H2 -> RCH2CR'H2}$$
Partial hydrogenation of alkynes is one technique to form (thermodynamically disfavored) cis alkenes. Alkane chemistry is less rich than alkene, and in most situations only partial hydrogenation is desired.

The largest-scale application of this technology is the petrochemical-refinery conversion of acetylene to ethylene (the steam cracking of alkanes yields a few percent acetylene, which is selectively hydrogenated in the presence of a palladium/silver catalyst). For more complex alkynes, the Lindlar catalyst is widely recommended to avoid formation of the alkane, for example in the conversion of phenylacetylene to styrene:

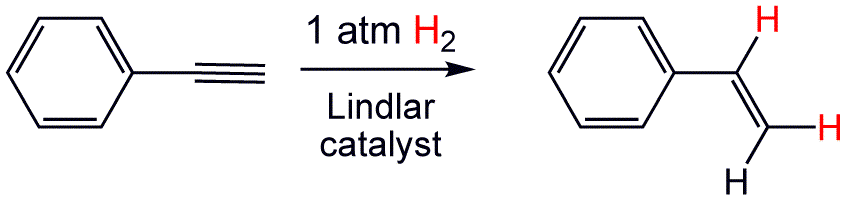

==== Halogenation ====
Similarly, alkynes characteristically are capable of adding two equivalents of halogens and hydrogen halides. Halogenation of alkynes gives the alkene dihalides or alkyl tetrahalides:
$$\ce{RC#CR' + 2 Br2 -> RCBr2CR'Br2}$$
Addition of hydrogen halides has long been of interest. In the presence of mercuric chloride as a catalyst, acetylene and hydrogen chloride react to give vinyl chloride. While this method has been abandoned in the West, it remains the main production method in China.

==== Hydration ====
Alkynes hydrate to give carbonyl compounds. The transformation typically requires metal catalysts, and gives an anti-Markovnikov addition result, although oxymercuration is Markovnikov.

Acetylene gives acetaldehyde. The reaction proceeds by formation of vinyl alcohol, which tautomerizes to form the aldehyde. This reaction was once a major industrial process but it has been displaced by the Wacker process. This reaction occurs in nature, the catalyst being acetylene hydratase.

Hydration of phenylacetylene gives acetophenone:

$$\ce{PhC#CH + H2O -> PhCOCH3}$$

(Ph_{3}P)AuCH_{3} catalyzes hydration of 1,8-nonadiyne to 2,8-nonanedione:

$$\ce{HC#C(CH2)5C#CH + 2H2O -> CH3CO(CH2)5COCH3}$$

==== Metal complexes ====
Alkynes form Dewar-Chatt-Duncanson complexes with transition metals. Such complexes are often intermediates in metal-catalyzed alkyne reactions.

=== Cycloaddition and oxidation ===
Alkynes undergo diverse cycloadditions. Only one π bond is perpendicular to incipient ring, and they often react similarly to the corresponding alkene. Nevertheless, electron-poverty makes electrophilic alkynes especially effective dienophiles.

Diels–Alder reaction with 1,3-dienes gives 1,4-cyclohexadienes, and the "cycloadduct" from the addition of alkynes to 2-pyrone eliminates carbon dioxide to give the aromatic compound.

Analogous reactions form 5-membered rings. The [2+2+1]-cycloaddition of an alkyne, alkene and carbon monoxide is the Pauson–Khand reaction, and azide alkyne Huisgen cycloaddition gives triazoles. Oxidative cleavage of alkynes proceeds via cycloaddition to metal oxides. Most famously, potassium permanganate converts alkynes to a pair of carboxylic acids via an isolable 1,2-diketone intermediate.

Other specialized cycloadditions include alkyne trimerisation to give benzene derivatives, and enyne metathesis to form a conjugated diene.

=== Isomerization to allenes ===
Alkynes can be isomerized by strong base or transition metals to allenes. Due to their comparable thermodynamic stabilities, the equilibrium constant of alkyne/allene isomerization is generally within several orders of magnitude of unity. For example propyne can be isomerized to give an equilibrium mixture with propadiene:
$$\ce{HC#C-CH3 <=> CH2=C=CH2}$$
A repetition of this process is the alkyne zipper reaction.

=== Metathesis ===
Alkyne metathesis scrambles carbyne (RC) centers:
$$\ce{RC#CR + R'C#CR' <=> 2RC#CR'}$$

=== Reactions specific for terminal alkynes ===
Terminal alkynes are weak acids. Their pK_{a} values are typically around 25, i.e. intermediate between that of ammonia (35) and ethanol (16):

$$\ce{RC#CH + MX -> RC#CM + HX}$$

where MX = NaNH_{2}, LiBu, RMgX, or Ag(NH_{3})_{2}OH (diamminesilver(I) hydroxide).

This reactivity allows ready derivativization, i.e. couplings and condensations. For example, condensation with formaldehyde and acetylene produces butynediol:

$$\ce{2CH2O + HC#CH  ->  HOCH2CCCH2OH}$$

In the Favorskii reaction and other alkynylations, terminal alkynes add to carbonyl compounds to give the hydroxyalkyne.

Late transition metals form more covalent acetylides, which are the active species in various noble metal cross-coupling reactions. In the Sonogashira reaction, terminal alkynes are coupled with aryl or vinyl halides:

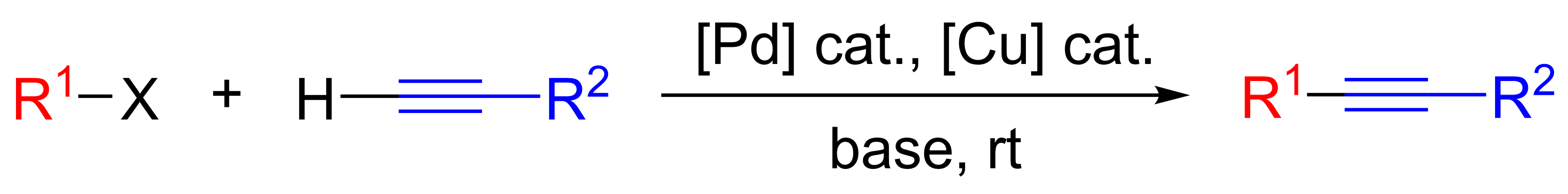

Thus, terminal alkynes can be oxidatively coupled to give diynes using copper reagents:

$$\ce{2R-\!{\equiv}\!-H ->[\ce{Cu(OAc)2}][\ce{pyridine}] R-\!{\equiv}\!-\!{\equiv}\!-R}$$

Copper acetylides (CuC_{2}R) species are intermediates and oxygen is the oxidant Some of these conversions are described as named reactions Cadiot–Chodkiewicz, Glaser, and Eglinton couplings.

== Alkynes in nature and medicine ==
The cetylenic compound, dehydromatricaria ester, was isolated from an Artemisia species in 1826. Since that time, well over a thousand acetylenes have been discovered in natural sources. Polyynes have been isolated from a wide variety of plant species, cultures of higher fungi, bacteria, marine sponges, and corals. Some acids like tariric acid contain an alkyne group. Diynes and triynes, species with the linkage RC≡C–C≡CR′ and RC≡C–C≡C–C≡CR′ respectively, occur in certain plants (Ichthyothere, Chrysanthemum, Cicuta, Oenanthe and other members of the Asteraceae and Apiaceae families). Some examples are cicutoxin, oenanthotoxin, and falcarinol. These compounds are highly bioactive, e.g. as nematocides. 1-Phenylhepta-1,3,5-triyne is illustrative of a naturally occurring triyne. Biosynthetically, the enediyne natural products are also derived from a polyyne precursor.

Alkynes occur in some pharmaceuticals, including the contraceptive noretynodrel. A carbon–carbon triple bond is also present in marketed drugs such as the antiretroviral efavirenz and the antifungal terbinafine. Molecules called ene-diynes feature a ring containing an alkene ("ene") between two alkyne groups ("diyne"). These compounds, e.g. calicheamicin, are some of the most aggressive antitumor drugs known, so much so that the ene-diyne subunit is sometimes referred to as a "warhead". Ene-diynes undergo rearrangement via the Bergman cyclization, generating highly reactive radical intermediates that attack DNA within the tumor.

== See also ==
- -yne
- Cycloalkyne
