= Partial agonist =

Agonist drug having partial efficacy at a receptor

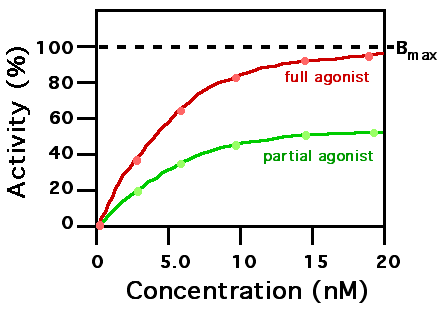
Relationship between percentage activity and concentration of full agonists and partial agonists

In pharmacology, partial agonists are drugs that bind to and activate a given receptor, but have only partial efficacy at the receptor relative to a full agonist. They may also be considered ligands which display both agonistic and antagonistic effects—when both a full agonist and partial agonist are present, the partial agonist actually acts as a competitive antagonist, competing with the full agonist for receptor occupancy and producing a net decrease in the receptor activation observed with the full agonist alone. Clinically, partial agonists can be used to activate receptors to give a desired submaximal response when inadequate amounts of the endogenous ligand are present, or they can reduce the overstimulation of receptors when excess amounts of the endogenous ligand are present.

Some currently common drugs that have been classed as partial agonists at particular receptors include buspirone, aripiprazole, buprenorphine, clobazam, nordazepam, nalmefene and norclozapine. Examples of ligands activating peroxisome proliferator-activated receptor gamma as partial agonists are honokiol and falcarindiol. Delta-9-tetrahydrocannabivarin (THCV) is a partial agonist at CB_{2} receptors and this activity might be implicated in ∆^{9}-THCV-mediated anti-inflammatory effects. Additionally, delta-9-tetrahydrocannabinol (THC) is a partial agonist at both the CB_{1} and CB_{2} receptors, with the former being responsible for its psychoactive effects.

== See also ==
- Competitive antagonist
- Intrinsic sympathomimetic activity of beta blockers
- Inverse agonist
- Mixed agonist/antagonist
