= C17H24O =

The molecular formula C_{17}H_{24}O (molar mass: 244.37 g/mol, exact mass: 244.1827 u) may refer to:

- Falcarinol, also known as carotatoxin or panaxynol
