= YNE =

YNE, or similar, may refer to:

- -yne, a suffix used in organic chemistry for names of alkynes
- Lang'e language, a Loloish language of Yunnan, China
- Norway House Airport, Norway House, Manitoba, Canada
