= Octatetraynyl radical =

Organic radical molecule

- Skeletal formula of the octatetraynyl radical with the explicit hydrogen added

Names
- Preferred IUPAC name Octa-1,3,5,7-tetrayn-1-yl

Identifiers
3D model (JSmol)	Interactive image; anion: Interactive image
ChemSpider	10809239
PubChem CID	57417316; anion: 100986430
- InChI: InChI=1S/C8H/c1-3-5-7-8-6-4-2/h1H Key: GTEOCQSGHJLKQX-UHFFFAOYSA-N; anion: InChI=1S/C8H/c1-3-5-7-8-6-4-2/h1H/q-1 Key: JPYHXIJMECKQLV-UHFFFAOYSA-N
- SMILES: [C]#CC#CC#CC#C; anion: [C-]#CC#CC#CC#C

Properties
Chemical formula	C_{8}H
Molar mass	97.096 g·mol^{−1}
- Except where otherwise noted, data are given for materials in their standard state (at 25 °C [77 °F], 100 kPa). verify (what is ?) Infobox references

Octatetraynyl radical (C_{8}H) is an organic free radical with eight carbon atoms linked in a linear chain with alternating single bonds and triple bonds (H−C≡C−C≡C−C≡C−C≡C•).

In 2007 negatively charged octatetraynyl was detected in Galactic molecular source TMC-1, making it the second type of anion to be found in the interstellar medium (after hexatriynyl radical) and the largest such molecule detected to date.
