= Ichthyothereol =

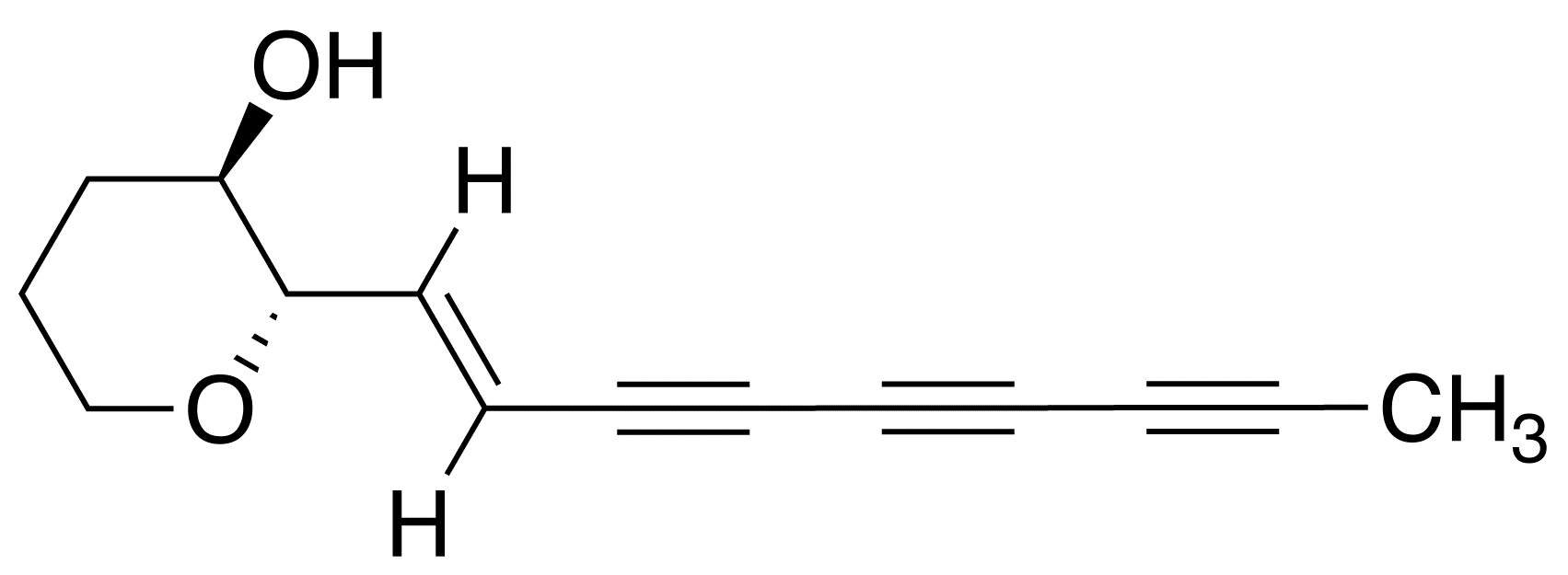

Names
- Preferred IUPAC name (2S,3R)-2-[(1E)-Non-1-ene-3,5,7-triyn-1-yl]oxan-3-ol
- Other names (−)-Ichthyothereol, Cunaniol

Identifiers
CAS Number	2294-61-3
3D model (JSmol)	Interactive image
ChemSpider	4953853
PubChem CID	6451387
UNII	6VLN4U8PSW
CompTox Dashboard (EPA)	DTXSID101156869
- InChI: InChI=1S/C14H14O2/c1-2-3-4-5-6-7-8-11-14-13(15)10-9-12-16-14/h8,11,13-15H,9-10,12H2,1H3/b11-8+/t13-,14+/m1/s1
- SMILES: CC#CC#CC#C/C=C/[C@H]1[C@@H](CCCO1)O

Properties
Chemical formula	C_{14}H_{14}O_{2}
Molar mass	214.264 g·mol^{−1}
- Except where otherwise noted, data are given for materials in their standard state (at 25 °C [77 °F], 100 kPa). Infobox references

Ichthyothereol is a toxic polyyne compound found in the leaves and flowers of several plants in South and Central America. These plant sources and their extracts are known for their toxic effects on fish, and have long been used by various native tribes in the lower Amazon basin for fishing. The name of the genus Ichthyothere, the members of which contain noticeable amounts of the natural product in their leaves, literally translates as fish poison. It is so toxic, fish will jump out of the water if Ichthyothere terminalis leaves are used as bait. This chemical is also found in the leaves and flowers of Dahlia coccinea. The actual chemical was isolated by several different groups and its full chemical structure determined in 1965. The first total synthesis was published in 2001.

It is also toxic to mice and dogs, producing convulsant effects that are similar to those of picrotoxin.
