= Fritsch–Buttenberg–Wiechell rearrangement =

Chemical reaction series

Named after	Paul Ernst Moritz Fritsch; Wilhelm Paul Buttenberg; Heinrich G. Wiechell
Reaction type	Rearrangement reaction

Identifiers
RSC ontology ID	RXNO:0000250

The Fritsch–Buttenberg–Wiechell rearrangement, named for Paul Ernst Moritz Fritsch (1859–1913), Wilhelm Paul Buttenberg, and Heinrich G. Wiechell, is a chemical reaction whereby a 1,1-diaryl-2-bromo-alkene rearranges to a 1,2-diaryl-alkyne by reaction with a strong base such as an alkoxide.

The Fritsch-Buttenberg-Wiechell rearrangement

This rearrangement is also possible with alkyl substituents.

== Reaction mechanism ==
The strong base deprotonates the vinylic hydrogen, which after alpha elimination forms a vinyl carbene. A 1,2-aryl migration forms the 1,2-diaryl-alkyne product. The mechanism of the FBW rearrangement was a subject of on-surface studies where the vinyl radical was visualised with sub-atomic resolution.

Mechanism of the Fritsch-Buttenberg-Wiechell rearrangement

== Scope ==
One study explored this reaction for the synthesis of novel polyynes:

Fritsch-Buttenberg-Wiechell rearrangement Application

== See also ==
- Corey–Fuchs reaction
