= Corey–Fuchs reaction =

Chemical reaction series

Named after	Elias James Corey; Philip L. Fuchs
Reaction type	Substitution reaction

Identifiers
Organic Chemistry Portal	corey-fuchs-reaction
RSC ontology ID	RXNO:0000146

The Corey–Fuchs reaction, also known as the Ramirez–Corey–Fuchs reaction, is a series of chemical reactions designed to transform an aldehyde into an alkyne. The formation of the 1,1-dibromoolefins via phosphine-dibromomethylenes was originally discovered by Desai, McKelvie and Ramirez. The phosphine can be partially substituted by zinc dust, which can improve yields and simplify product separation. The second step of the reaction to convert dibromoolefins to alkynes is known as Fritsch–Buttenberg–Wiechell rearrangement. The overall combined transformation of an aldehyde to an alkyne by this method is named after its developers, American chemists Elias James Corey and Philip L. Fuchs.

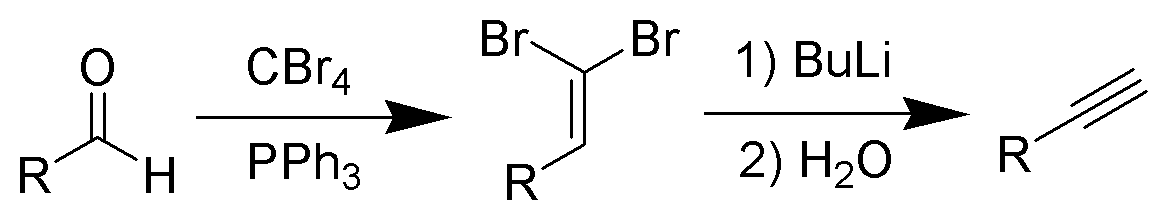
The Corey–Fuchs reaction

By suitable choice of base, it is often possible to stop the reaction at the 1-bromoalkyne, a useful functional group for further transformation.

== Reaction mechanism ==
The Corey–Fuchs reaction is based on a special case of the Wittig reaction, where two equivalents of triphenylphosphine are used with carbon tetrabromide to produce the triphenylphosphine-dibromomethylene ylide.

Step 1 of the Corey-Fuchs reaction, generating the active ylide

This ylide undergoes a Wittig reaction when exposed to an aldehyde. Alternatively, using a ketone generates a gem-dibromoalkene.

Step 2 in the Corey-Fuchs reaction, doing the Wittig to make the dibromoalkene

The second part of the reaction converts the isolable gem-dibromoalkene intermediate to the alkyne. Deuterium-labelling studies show that this step proceeds through a carbene mechanism. Lithium-bromide exchange is followed by α-elimination to afford the carbene. 1,2-shift then affords the deuterium-labelled terminal alkyne. The 50% H-incorporation could be explained by deprotonation of the (acidic) terminal deuterium with excess BuLi.

Deuterium-labelling shows the involvement of carbenes in the second part of the Corey-Fuchs reaction.

== See also ==
- Appel reaction
- Fritsch-Buttenberg-Wiechell rearrangement
- Seyferth-Gilbert homologation
- Wittig reaction
