= Ichthyothere pastazensis =

Conservation status
- Near Threatened (IUCN 3.1)

Scientific classification
- Kingdom: Plantae
- Clade: Tracheophytes
- Clade: Angiosperms
- Clade: Eudicots
- Clade: Asterids
- Order: Asterales
- Family: Asteraceae
- Genus: Ichthyothere
- Species: I. pastazensis

Binomial name
- Ichthyothere pastazensis H.Rob.

Species of flowering plant

Ichthyothere pastazensis is a species of flowering plant in the family Asteraceae. It is found only in Ecuador. Its natural habitat is subtropical or tropical moist lowland forests.
