= -yne =

Chemical naming suffix denoting a triple bond

Ethynyl group (highlighted red) as part of a large molecule (ethinylestradiol).

In chemistry, the suffix -yne is used to denote the presence of a triple bond (≡).

The suffix follows IUPAC nomenclature, and is mainly used in organic chemistry. However, inorganic compounds featuring unsaturation in the form of triple bonds may be denoted by substitutive nomenclature with the same methods used with alkynes, i.e., the name of the corresponding saturated hydride is modified by replacing the "-ane" ending with "-yne". The suffix "-diyne" is used when there are two triple bonds, and so on. The position of unsaturation is indicated by a numerical locant immediately preceding the "-yne" suffix, or locants in the case of multiple triple bonds. Locants are chosen to be as low as possible. While generally used as a suffix, "-yne" is also used as an infix to name substituent groups that are triply bound to the parent compound.

This suffix arose as a collapsed form of the end of the word acetylene. The final "-e" disappears if it is followed by another suffix that starts with a vowel.

== See also ==
- IUPAC nomenclature of organic chemistry
