= Alkyne zipper reaction =

Chemical reaction

The alkyne zipper reaction is an organic reaction of unsaturated hydrocarbons. In the presence of an extremely strong base, a non-terminal alkyne isomerizes to a terminal alkynylide anion:

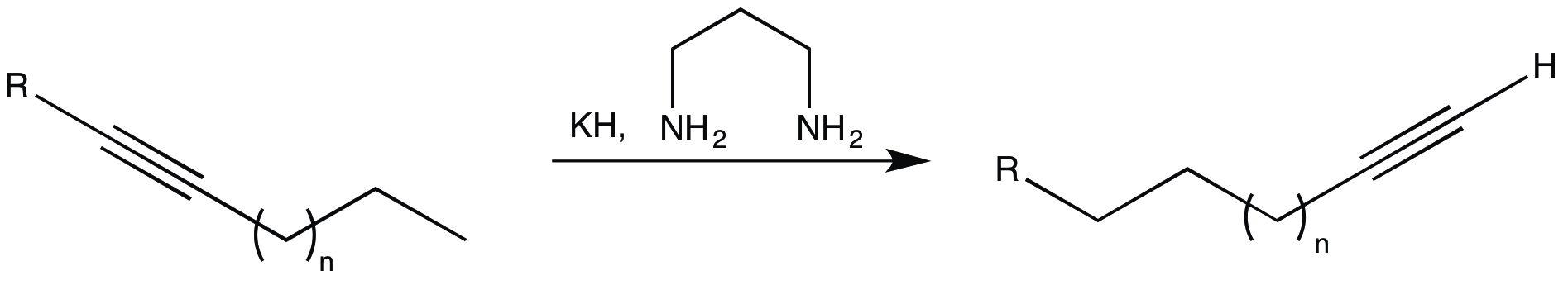

The reaction is an equilibrium reaction, and is driven by formation (and possibly precipitation) of the terminal anion. The conversion proceeds for straight-chain alkynes and acetylinic ethers, and provides remote functionalization in long chains.

Zipper isomerization was first reported by Alexey Favorsky in 1887.

== Equilibrium ==
The alkyne zipper occurs through repeated isomerizations between an alkyne and an allene. First, the base deprotonates the less-substituted methylene adjacent to the alkyne group, to form an allene anion. The anion reprotonates, but at the other end. Then the base attacks the same lesser-substituted carbon on the allene, catalyzing a similar process to form an alkyne:

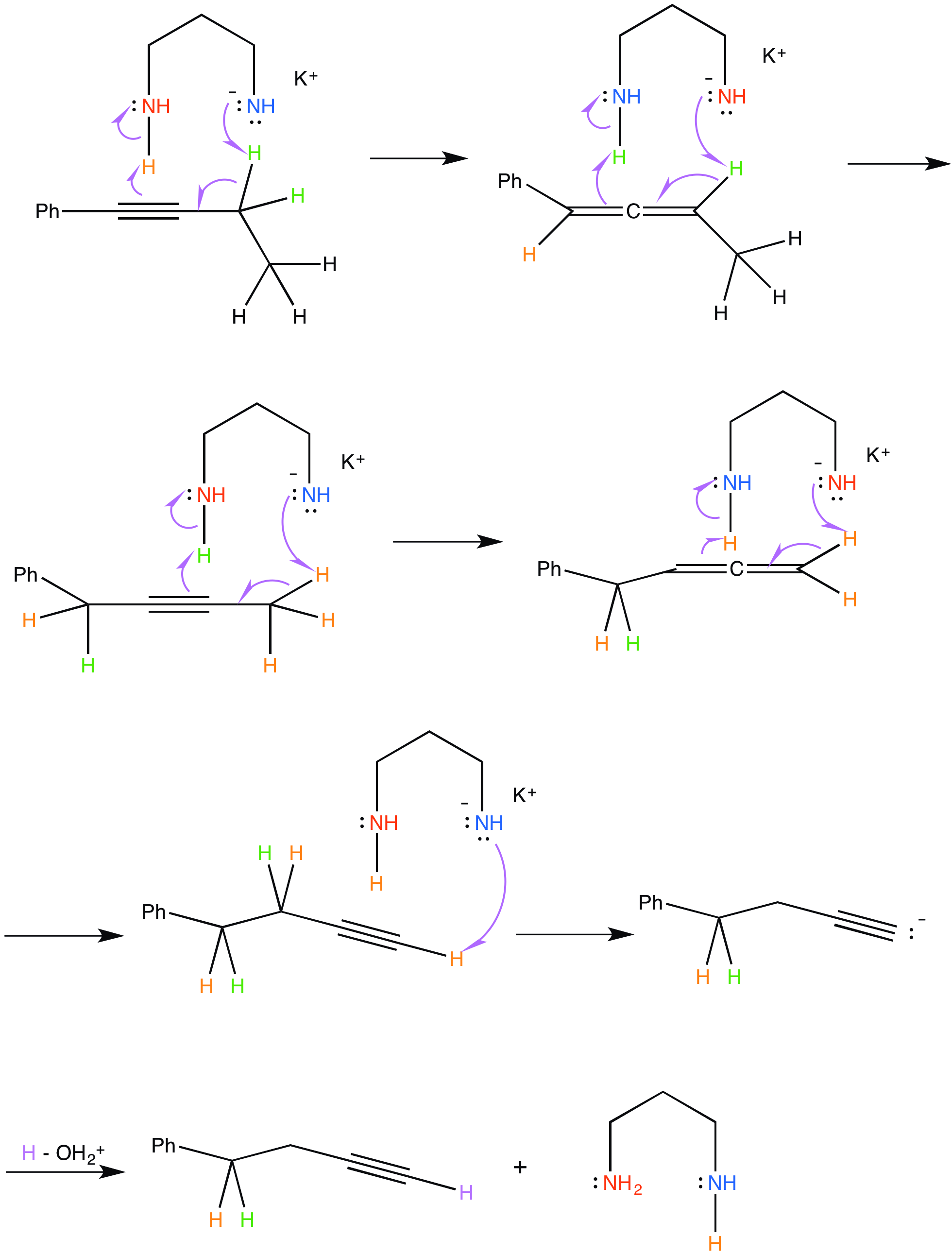

Through repetition, the alkyne/allene pseudoparticle can move arbitrarily along an unsubstituted alkane chain. When a terminal alkyne is achieved, the base instead attacks and removes the terminal proton.

A mild acid workup quenches the equilibrium before reprotonating the acetylide anion.

== Choice of base ==
The alkyne zipper reaction requires a base strong enough to deprotonate the final alkyne to form a terminal alkynylide anion salt. Otherwise, the base sets up an isomerization equilibrium, but internal alkynes are thermodynamically favored over terminal alkynes.

Potash amides, from the reaction of potassium hydride and a diamine, are sufficient, and the state of the art in 1975 was potassium 1,3-diaminopropanide, generated in situ from potassium hydride in 1,3-diaminopropane solvent. Ethylenediamine cannot replace 1,3-diaminopropane.

As potassium hydride is expensive and hazardous, LiCKOR base is an acceptable substitute. In the synthesis of 9-decyn-1-ol from 2-decyn-1-ol, a mixture of lithium 1,3-diaminopropanide and potassium tert-butoxide affords yields of approximately 85%:

HO–CH_{2}C≡C–(CH_{2})_{6}CH_{3} → HO(CH_{2})_{8}–C≡CH
