= Falcarinol =

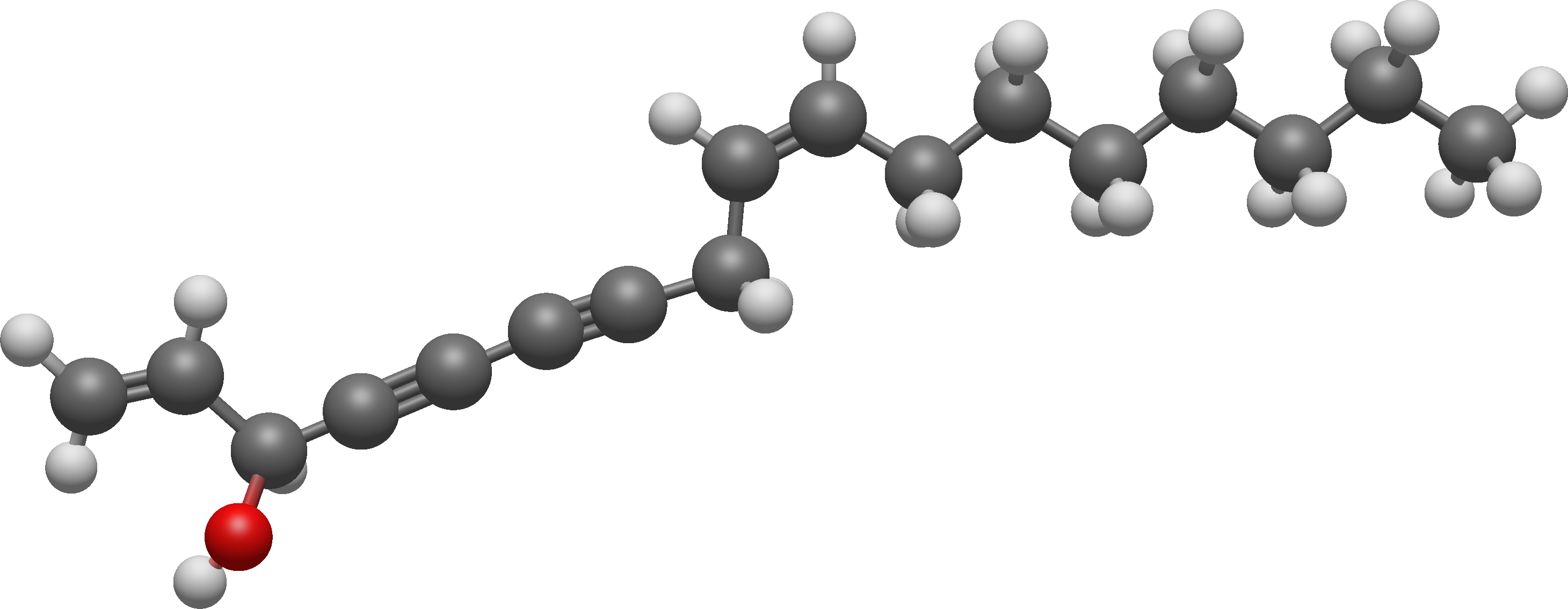

Names
- IUPAC name (3S,9Z)-Heptadeca-1,9-diene-4,6-diyn-3-ol
- Other names Carotatoxin, panaxynol

Identifiers
CAS Number	21852-80-2
3D model (JSmol)	Interactive image
ChemSpider	4580244
KEGG	C08450
PubChem CID	5469789
UNII	8P1DJD416I
CompTox Dashboard (EPA)	DTXSID50415266
- InChI: InChI=1S/C17H24O/c1-3-5-6-7-8-9-10-11-12-13-14-15-16-17(18)4-2/h4,10-11,17-18H,2-3,5-9,12H2,1H3/b11-10-/t17-/m0/s1 Key: UGJAEDFOKNAMQD-MQNTZWLQSA-N; InChI=1/C17H24O/c1-3-5-6-7-8-9-10-11-12-13-14-15-16-17(18)4-2/h4,10-11,17-18H,2-3,5-9,12H2,1H3/b11-10-/t17-/m0/s1 Key: UGJAEDFOKNAMQD-MQNTZWLQBN
- SMILES: C=C[C@H](O)C#CC#CC/C=C\CCCCCCC

Properties
Chemical formula	C_{17}H_{24}O
Molar mass	244.378 g·mol^{−1}
- Except where otherwise noted, data are given for materials in their standard state (at 25 °C [77 °F], 100 kPa). verify (what is ?) Infobox references

Falcarinol (also known as carotatoxin or panaxynol) is a natural pesticide and fatty alcohol found in carrots (Daucus carota), celery (Apium graveolens), fennel (Foeniculum vulgare), parsnip (Pastinaca sativa), ginseng (Panax ginseng) and ivy (Hedera). In carrots, it occurs in a concentration of approximately 2 mg/kg. As a toxin, it protects carrot roots from fungal diseases such as liquorice rot, which causes black spots on the roots during storage. The compound is sensitive to light and heat.

== Chemistry ==
Falcarinol is a polyyne with two carbon-carbon triple bonds and two double bonds. The double bond at the carbon 9 position has cis stereochemistry was introduced by the desaturation, which requires oxygen and NADPH (or NADH) cofactors and creates a bend in the molecule. It is structurally related to oenanthotoxin and cicutoxin.

== Biological effects ==
Falcarinol is an intense irritant that can cause allergic reactions and contact dermatitis. It was shown that falcarinol acts as a covalent cannabinoid receptor type 1 inverse agonist and blocks the effect of anandamide in keratinocytes, leading to pro-allergic effects in human skin. Normal consumption of carrots has no toxic effect in humans.

== Biosynthesis ==
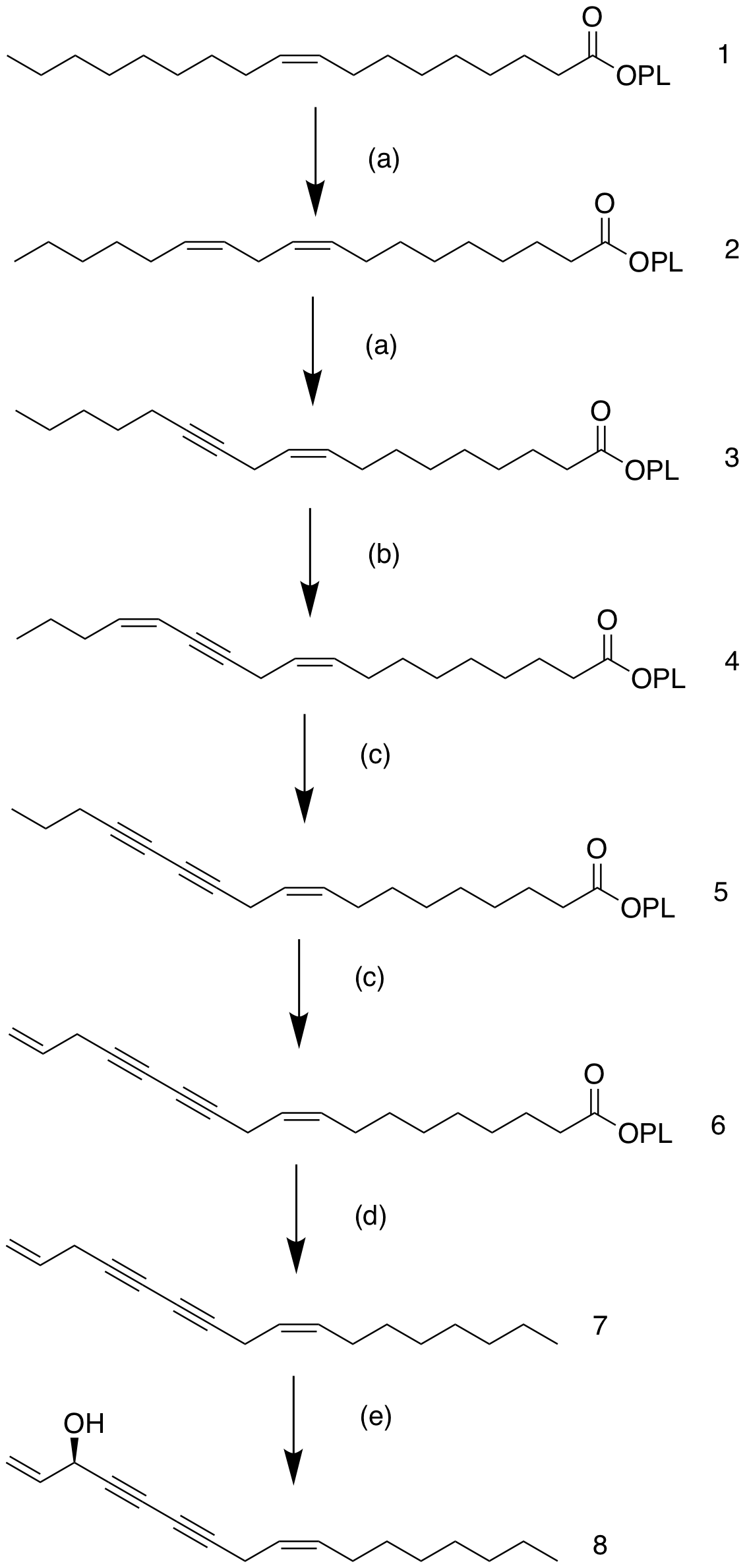
Falcarinol biosynthesis route

Starting with oleic acid (1), which possesses a cis double bond at the carbon 9 position from desaturation and a bound of phospholipids (-PL), a bifunctional Δ^{12}-desaturase - acetylase system occurred with oxygen (a) to introduce the second cis double bond at the carbon 12 position to form linoleic acid (2). This step was then repeated to turn the cis double bond at the carbon 12 position into a triple bond (also called acetylenic bond) to form crepenynic acid (3). Crepenynic acid was reacted with oxygen (b) to form a second cis double bond at the carbon 14 position (conjugated position) leading to the formation of dehydrocrepenynic acid (4). Allylic isomerization (c) was responsible for the changes from the cis double bond at the carbon 14 position into the triple bond (5) and formation of the more favored trans (E) double bond at the carbon 17 position (6). Finally, after forming the intermediate (7) by decarboxylation (d), falcarinol (8) was produced by hydroxylation (e) at the carbon 16 position that introduced the (R)-configuration to the system.

== See also ==
- Falcarindiol
