= Seyferth–Gilbert homologation =

Named after	Dietmar Seyferth; John C. Gilbert
Reaction type	Homologation reaction

Identifiers
Organic Chemistry Portal	seyferth-gilbert-homologation
RSC ontology ID	RXNO:0000387

The Seyferth–Gilbert homologation is a chemical reaction of an aryl ketone 1 (or aldehyde) with dimethyl (diazomethyl)phosphonate 2 and potassium tert-butoxide to give substituted alkynes 3. Dimethyl (diazomethyl)phosphonate 2 is often called the Seyferth–Gilbert reagent.

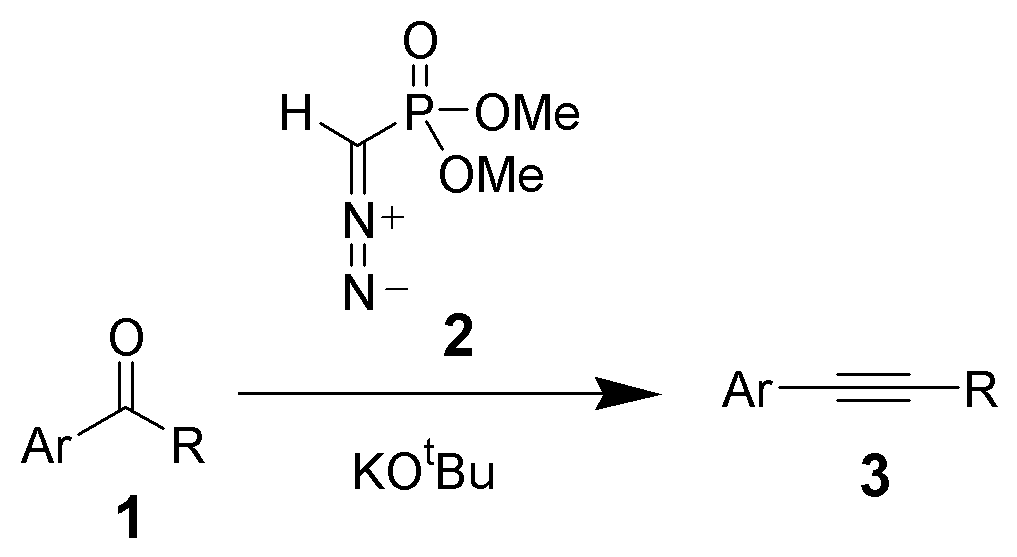
The Seyferth–Gilbert homologation

This reaction is called a homologation because the product has exactly one additional carbon more than the starting material.

== Reaction mechanism ==
Deprotonation of the Seyferth–Gilbert reagent A gives an anion B, which reacts with the ketone to form the oxaphosphetane D. Elimination of dimethylphosphate E gives the vinyl diazo-intermediate Fa and Fb. The generation of nitrogen gas gives a vinyl carbene G, which via a 1,2-migration forms the desired alkyne H.

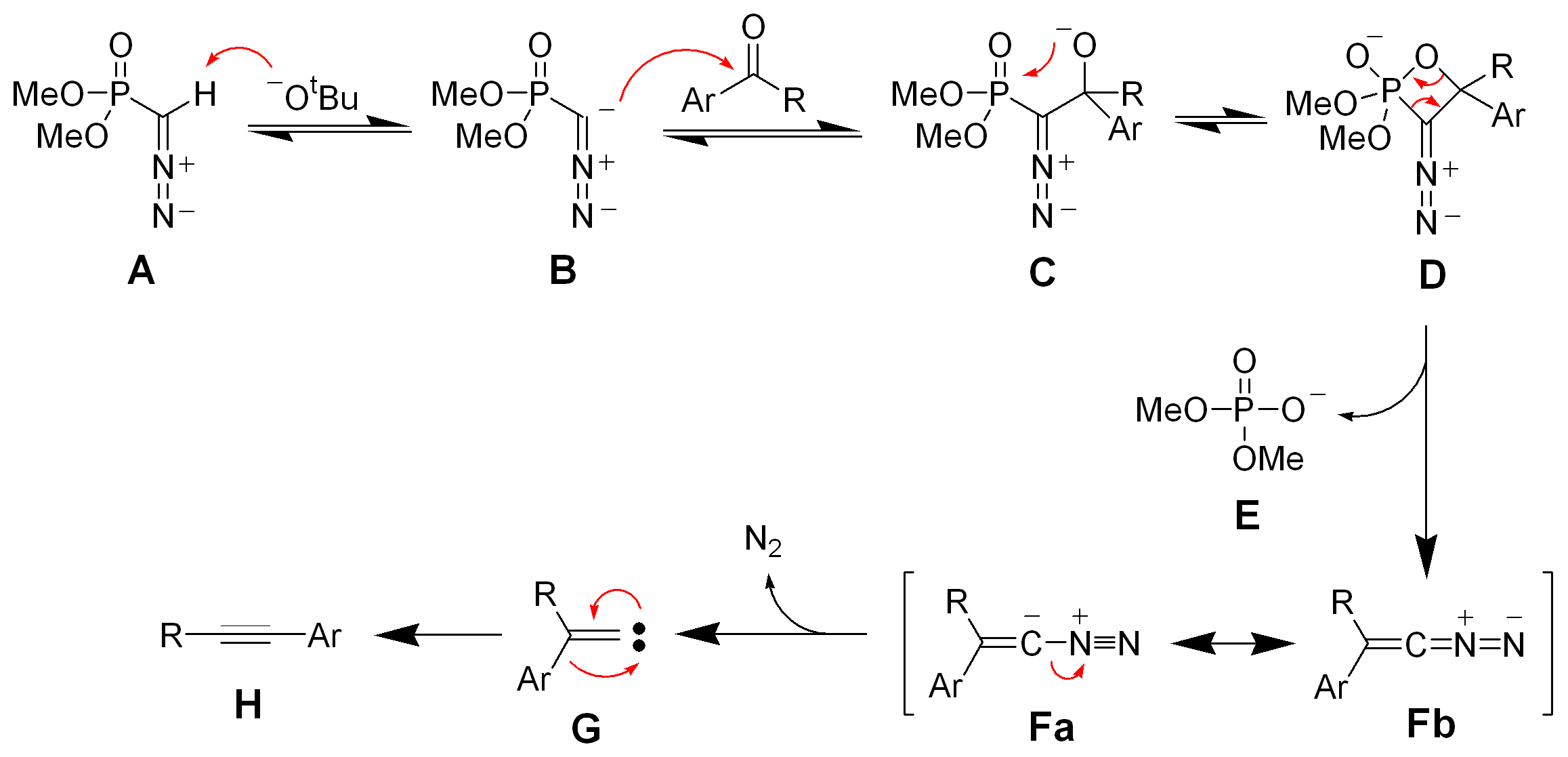
The mechanism of the Seyferth–Gilbert homologation

== Bestmann modification ==
Ohira–Bestmann reagent

Names
- IUPAC name dimethyl (1-diazo-2-oxopropyl)phosphonate

Identifiers
CAS Number	90965-06-3
3D model (JSmol)	Interactive image
ChemSpider	9281325
PubChem CID	11106189
UNII	96G79J0LR6
- InChI: InChI=1S/C5H9N2O4P/c1-4(8)5(7-6)12(9,10-2)11-3/h1-3H3 Key: SQHSJJGGWYIFCD-UHFFFAOYSA-N; InChI=1/C5H9N2O4P/c1-4(8)5(7-6)12(9,10-2)11-3/h1-3H3 Key: SQHSJJGGWYIFCD-UHFFFAOYAK
- SMILES: O=P(OC)(OC)C(C(C)=O)=[N+]=[N-]

Properties
Chemical formula	C_{5}H_{9}N_{2}O_{4}P
Molar mass	192.11
- Except where otherwise noted, data are given for materials in their standard state (at 25 °C [77 °F], 100 kPa). Infobox references

The dimethyl (diazomethyl)phosphonate carbanion can be generated in situ from the Ohira-Bestmann reagent by methanolysis, cleaving the acetyl group and generating one equivalent of methyl acetate. Reaction of Bestmann's reagent with aldehydes gives terminal alkynes often in very high yield and fewer steps than the Corey–Fuchs reaction.

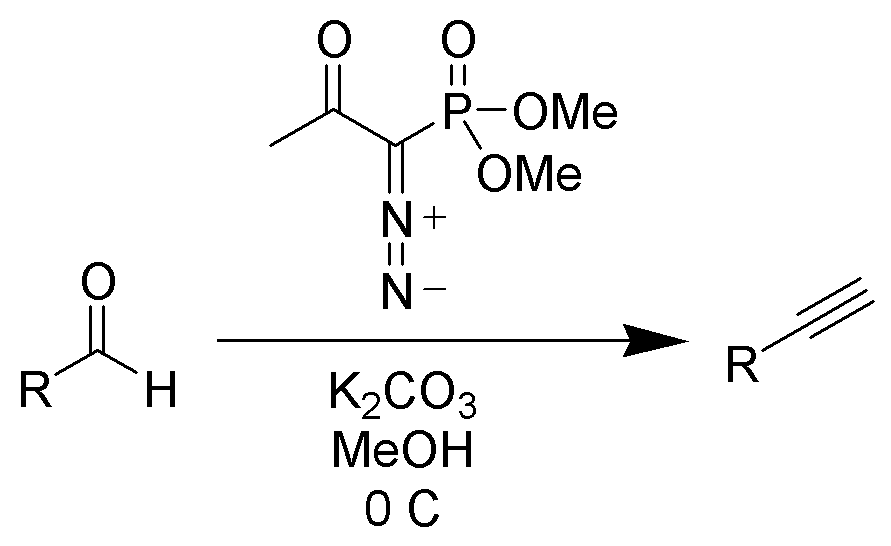
Bestmann's reagent

The use of the milder potassium carbonate makes this procedure much more compatible with a wide variety of functional groups.

Traditional syntheses of the Ohira−Bestmann reagent use the rather explosive tosyl azide, but better diazo transfer agents are available:

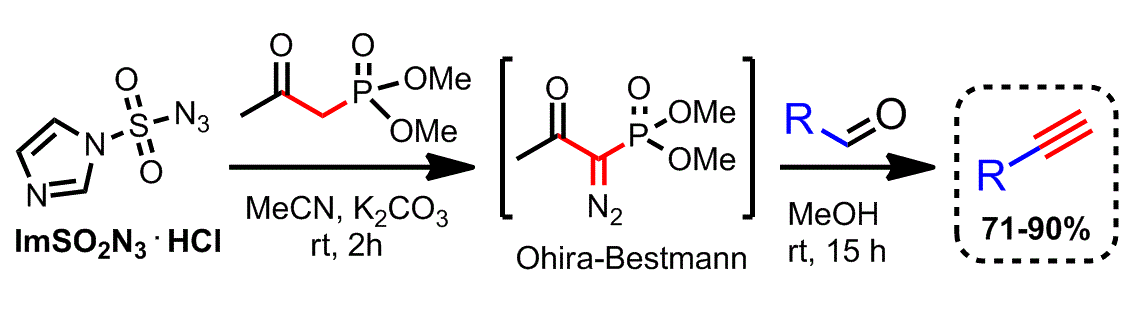
Safe and scalable synthesis of alkynes from aldehydes

== Other modifications ==
Another modification for less reactive aldehydes is made by replacement of potassium carbonate with caesium carbonate in MeOH and results in a drastic yield increase.

== See also ==
- Corey–Fuchs reaction
- Horner–Wadsworth–Emmons reaction
- Wittig reaction
