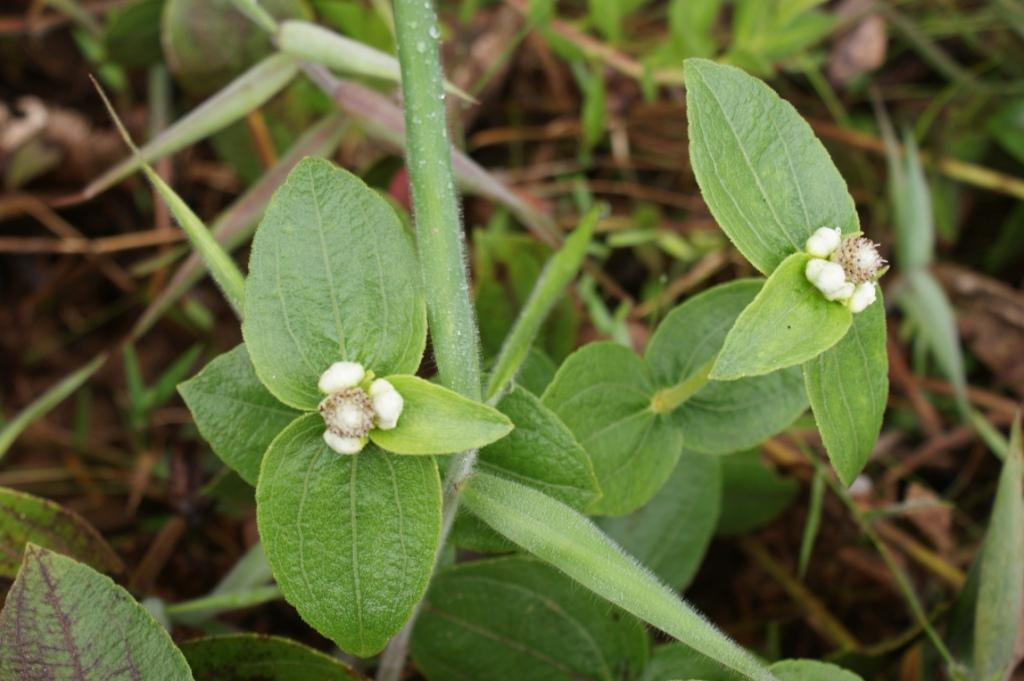
- Ichthyothere elliptica

Scientific classification
- Kingdom: Plantae
- Clade: Tracheophytes
- Clade: Angiosperms
- Clade: Eudicots
- Clade: Asterids
- Order: Asterales
- Family: Asteraceae
- Subfamily: Asteroideae
- Tribe: Millerieae
- Subtribe: Espeletiinae
- Genus: Ichthyothere; Mart., 1830

Synonyms
- Torrentia Vell.; Latreillea DC.

= Ichthyothere =

Genus of plants

Ichthyothere is a genus of flowering plants, found in parts of South America (the Amazon) and Central America.

The name ichthyothere literally translates as fish poison. These plants' active constituent is a chemical called ichthyothereol, which is a polyyne compound that is highly toxic to fish and mammals. Ichthyothere terminalis leaves have traditionally been used to make poisoned bait by indigenous peoples of the lower Amazon basin.

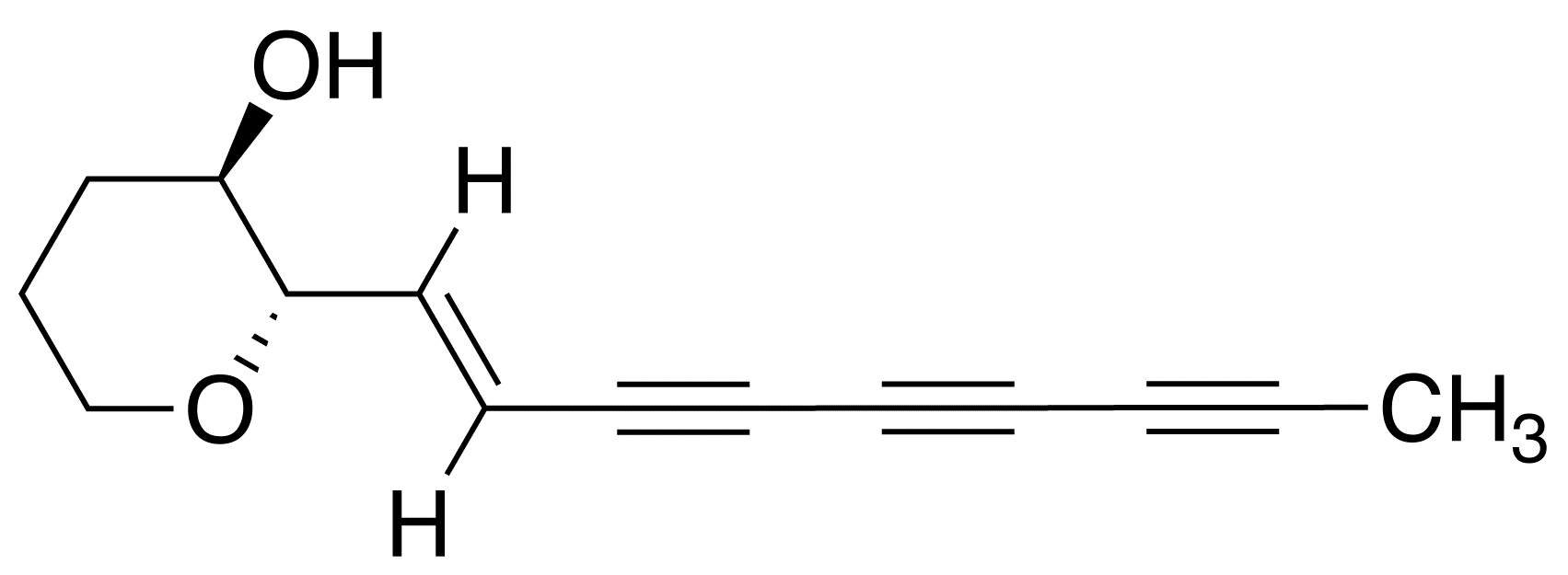
Ichthyothereol, a potent fish poison found in members of this genus

This genus is characterized by the small capitulum with few (usually one or two) fertile ray florets. It lacks an expanded outer series of herbaceous involucral bracts or phyllaries. These tend to be much reduced.

Ichthyothere scandens and Ichthyothere garcia-barrigae, both found at elevations above 1,000m, belong to a unique subgenus within Ichthyothere. The other species are small herbs with an erect stem, showing tightly clustered or glomerulate groups of capitula. They occur below 1,000 m elevation.

Its taxonomic status has been revised several times. It was classified in the subtribes Melampodiinae, Milleriinae and then in a group of unclassified taxa. Recent molecular phylogenetic research has now placed the genus Ichthyothere in the subtribe Espeletiinae. It may be a sister taxon to the Espeletia complex.

Species

Species accepted by the Plants of the World Online as of December 2022:

- Ichthyothere connata S.F.Blake
- Ichthyothere cordata Malme
- Ichthyothere cunabi Mart.
- Ichthyothere davidsei H.Rob.
- Ichthyothere elliptica H.Rob.
- Ichthyothere garcia-barrigae H.Rob.
- Ichthyothere grandifolia S.F.Blake
- Ichthyothere granvillei H.Rob.
- Ichthyothere hirsuta Gardner
- Ichthyothere integrifolia Baker
- Ichthyothere latifolia Baker
- Ichthyothere linearis Baker
- Ichthyothere macdanielii H.Rob.
- Ichthyothere matogrossensis R.C.A.Pereira & Semir
- Ichthyothere mollis Baker
- Ichthyothere palustris Malme
- Ichthyothere pastazensis H.Rob.
- Ichthyothere perfoliata R.C.A.Pereira & Semir
- Ichthyothere peruviana Baker
- Ichthyothere petiolata H.Rob.
- Ichthyothere rufa Gardner
- Ichthyothere sasakiae Frisby & D.J.N.Hind
- Ichthyothere scandens S.F.Blake
- Ichthyothere suffruticosa Gardner
- Ichthyothere terminalis S.F.Blake
- Ichthyothere ternifolia Baker
- Ichthyothere woodii Frisby & D.J.N.Hind
