= Falcarindiol =

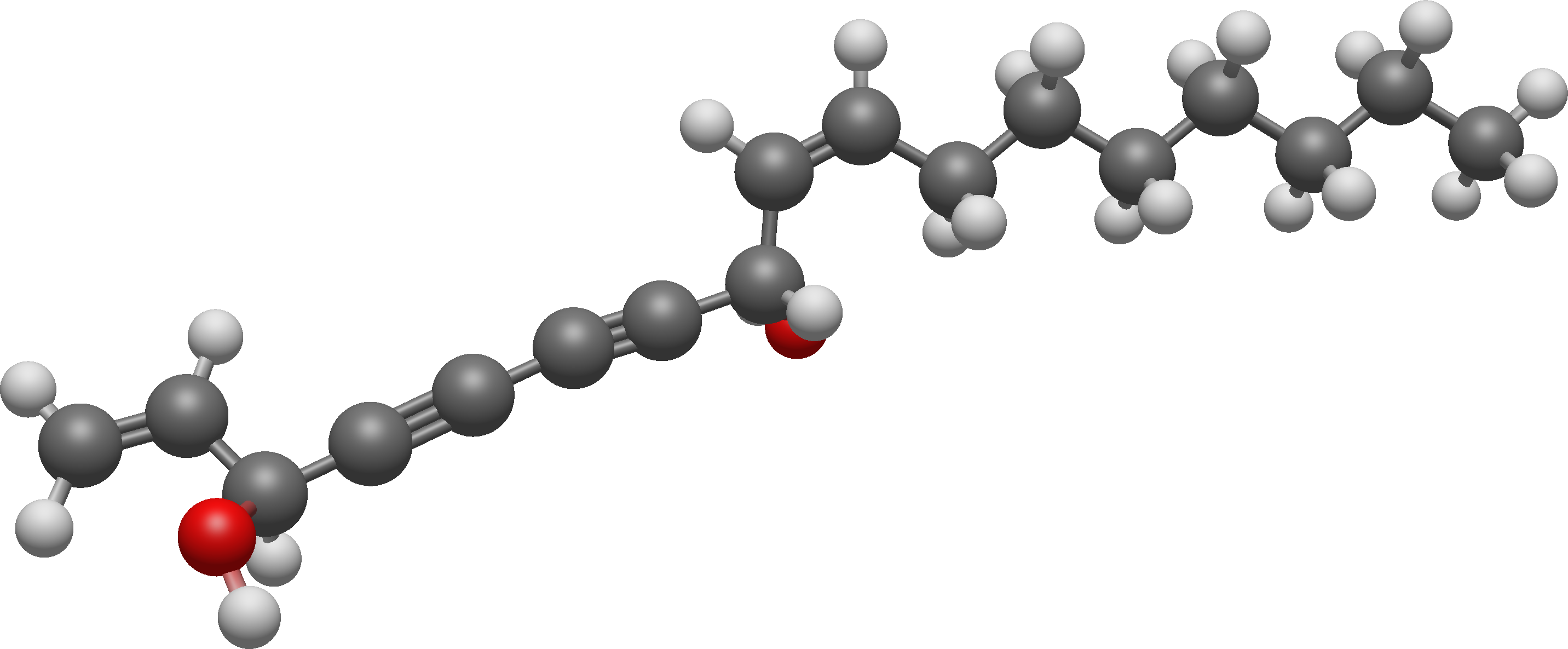

Names
- Preferred IUPAC name (3R,8S,9Z)-Heptadeca-1,9-diene-4,6-diyne-3,8-diol
- Other names cis-Heptadeca-1,9-diene-4,6-diyne-3,8-diol

Identifiers
CAS Number	55297-87-5
3D model (JSmol)	Interactive image
ChEMBL	ChEMBL69018
ChemSpider	4444588
PubChem CID	5281148
UNII	8G3AW3GYU8
CompTox Dashboard (EPA)	DTXSID701030449
- InChI: InChI=1S/C17H24O2/c1-3-5-6-7-8-9-10-14-17(19)15-12-11-13-16(18)4-2/h4,10,14,16-19H,2-3,5-9H2,1H3/b14-10-/t16-,17+/m1/s1 Key: QWCNQXNAFCBLLV-YWALDVPYSA-N; InChI=1/C17H24O2/c1-3-5-6-7-8-9-10-14-17(19)15-12-11-13-16(18)4-2/h4,10,14,16-19H,2-3,5-9H2,1H3/b14-10-/t16-,17+/m1/s1 Key: QWCNQXNAFCBLLV-YWALDVPYBU
- SMILES: CCCCCCC/C=C\[C@H](O)C#CC#C[C@H](O)C=C

Properties
Chemical formula	C_{17}H_{24}O_{2}
Molar mass	260.377 g·mol^{−1}
- Except where otherwise noted, data are given for materials in their standard state (at 25 °C [77 °F], 100 kPa). Infobox references

Falcarindiol is a polyyne found in carrot roots which has antifungal activity. Falcarindiol is the main compound responsible for bitterness in carrots. Falcarindiol and other falcarindiol-type polyacetylenes are also found in many other plants of the family Apiaceae, including some commonly used seasonings such as dill and parsley.

A variety of bioactivities have been reported for falcarindiol and the falcarindiol-type polyacetylenes, and because of potential health-promoting metabolic effects these compounds are studied as potential nutraceuticals. Falcarindiol is the most-active among several polyynes found in Devil's club (Oplopanax horridus) that inhibit cell proliferation.

== See also ==
- Falcarinol
