= Single bond =

Chemical bond between two atoms

Lewis structure for molecular hydrogen. Note depiction of the single bond.

Lewis structure for methane. Note depiction of the four single bonds between the carbon and hydrogen atoms.

Lewis structure for an alkane (octane). Note that all the bonds are single covalent bonds.

In chemistry, a single bond is a chemical bond between two atoms involving two valence electrons. That is, the atoms share one pair of electrons where the bond forms. Therefore, a single bond is a type of covalent bond. When shared, each of the two electrons involved is no longer in the sole possession of the orbital in which it originated. Rather, both of the two electrons spend time in either of the orbitals which overlap in the bonding process. As a Lewis structure, a single bond is denoted as AːA or A-A, for which A represents an element. In the first rendition, each dot represents a shared electron, and in the second rendition, the bar represents both of the electrons shared in the single bond.

A covalent bond can also be a double bond or a triple bond. A single bond is weaker than either a double bond or a triple bond. This difference in strength can be explained by examining the component bonds of which each of these types of covalent bonds consists (Moore, Stanitski, and Jurs 393).

Usually, a single bond is a sigma bond. An exception is the bond in diboron, which is a pi bond. In contrast, the double bond consists of one sigma bond and one pi bond, and a triple bond consists of one sigma bond and two pi bonds (Moore, Stanitski, and Jurs 396). The number of component bonds is what determines the strength disparity. It stands to reason that the single bond is the weakest of the three because it consists of only a sigma bond, and the double bond or triple bond consist not only of this type of component bond but also at least one additional bond.

The single bond has the capacity for rotation, a property not possessed by the double bond or the triple bond. The structure of pi bonds does not allow for rotation (at least not at 298 K), so the double bond and the triple bond which contain pi bonds are held due to this property. The sigma bond is not so restrictive, and the single bond is able to rotate using the sigma bond as the axis of rotation (Moore, Stanitski, and Jurs 396-397).

Another property comparison can be made in bond length. Single bonds are the longest of the three types of covalent bonds as interatomic attraction is greater in the two other types, double and triple. The increase in component bonds is the reason for this attraction increase as more electrons are shared between the bonded atoms (Moore, Stanitski, and Jurs 343).

Single bonds are often seen in diatomic molecules. Examples of this use of single bonds include H_{2}, F_{2}, and HCl.

Single bonds are also seen in molecules made up of more than two atoms. Examples of this use of single bonds include:

- Both bonds in H_{2}O
- All 4 bonds in CH_{4}

Single bonding even appears in molecules as complex as hydrocarbons larger than methane. The type of covalent bonding in hydrocarbons is extremely important in the nomenclature of these molecules. Hydrocarbons containing only single bonds are referred to as alkanes (Moore, Stanitski, and Jurs 334). The names of specific molecules which belong to this group end with the suffix -ane. Examples include ethane, 2-methylbutane, and cyclopentane (Moore, Stanitski, and Jurs 335).

== See also ==
- Bond order
