= Hexatriynyl radical =

Organic radical molecule

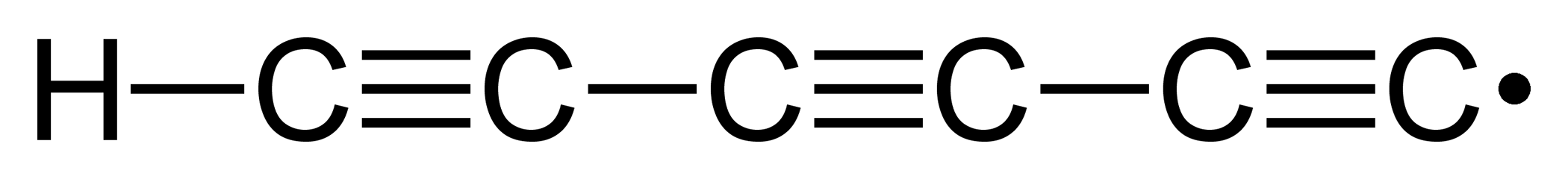

Names
- Preferred IUPAC name Hexa-1,3,5-triyn-1-yl

Identifiers
3D model (JSmol)	Interactive image
ChemSpider	10809203
PubChem CID	57417315
- InChI: InChI=1S/C6H/c1-3-5-6-4-2/h1H Key: MGBKUZLTRVWILP-UHFFFAOYSA-N; InChI=1S/C6H/c1-3-5-6-4-2/h1H Key: MGBKUZLTRVWILP-UHFFFAOYSA-N; InChI=1/C6H/c1-3-5-6-4-2/h1H Key: MGBKUZLTRVWILP-UHFFFAOYAP
- SMILES: C#CC#CC#[C]

Properties
Chemical formula	C_{6}H
Molar mass	73.074 g·mol^{−1}
- Except where otherwise noted, data are given for materials in their standard state (at 25 °C [77 °F], 100 kPa). verify (what is ?) Infobox references

The hexatriynyl radical, C_{6}H, is an organic radical molecule consisting of a linear chain of six carbon atoms terminated by a hydrogen (H−C≡C−C≡C−C≡C•). The unpaired electron is located at the opposite end to the hydrogen atom, as indicated. Both experimental work and computer simulations on this species was done in the early 1990s.

== Synthesis of the radical ==
The radical can be synthesized by photolysis. Two different examples involve

- Argon gas and buta-1,3-diene in a mole ratio of 1500:1
- Argon gas and acetylene in a mole ratio of 100:1

== Hexatriyne anion ==
In 2006 the negatively charged hexatriyne anion of this molecule, C_{6}H^{−}, was the first negatively charged ion to be discovered to exist in the interstellar medium, using the Green Bank Telescope. Negative ions were thought to be unstable in this environment due to the prevalence of ultraviolet light, which dislodges extra electrons such as this.

=== Synthesis of the anion ===
The laboratory synthesis starts from acetylene C_{2}H_{2}. The reaction takes place within a DC discharge at reduced pressure in a mixture with 15% argon. The product is observed by millimeter-wave spectroscopy.

=== Analogous species ===
The two species C_{4}H^{−} and C_{8}H^{−} have also been detected.

== See also ==
- Acetylene
- Diacetylene
