= -ane =

Chemical naming suffix

In organic chemistry, the suffix -ane forms the names of organic compounds where the −C−C− group (a carbon-carbon single bond) has been attributed the highest priority according to the rules of organic nomenclature. Such organic compounds are called alkanes. They are saturated hydrocarbons.

The names of the saturated hydrides of non-metals end with the suffix -ane: the hydrides of silicon are called silanes (SiH_{4}); the hydrides of boron are boranes (B_{2}H_{6}).

The final "-e" is dropped before a suffix that starts with a vowel, e.g. "propanol".

Alternatively, "-ane" may be used for a mononuclear hydride of an element. For instance, methane for CH_{4} and oxidane for H_{2}O (water). For the etymology, see Alkane.

== See also ==
- IUPAC nomenclature of organic chemistry
