= Free radical damage to DNA =

Damage to DNA as a result of exposure to ionizing radiation or radiomimetic compounds

Free radical damage to DNA can occur as a result of exposure to ionizing radiation or to radiomimetic compounds. Damage to DNA as a result of free radical attack is called indirect DNA damage because the radicals formed can diffuse throughout the body and affect other organs. Melanoma can be caused by indirect DNA damage because it is found in parts of the body not exposed to sunlight. DNA is vulnerable to radical attack because of the very labile hydrogens that can be abstracted and the prevalence of double bonds in the DNA bases that free radicals can easily add to.

== Damage via radiation exposure ==
Radiolysis of intracellular water by ionizing radiation creates peroxides, which are relatively stable precursors to hydroxyl radicals. 60%–70% of cellular DNA damage is caused by hydroxyl radicals, yet hydroxyl radicals are so reactive that they can only diffuse one or two molecular diameters before reacting with cellular components. Thus, hydroxyl radicals must be formed immediately adjacent to nucleic acids in order to react. Radiolysis of water creates peroxides that can act as diffusable, latent forms of hydroxyl radicals. Some metal ions in the vicinity of DNA generate the hydroxyl radicals from peroxide.

H_{2}O + hν → H_{2}O^{+} + e^{−}
H_{2}O + e^{−} → H_{2}O^{−}
H_{2}O^{+} → H^{+} + OH·
H_{2}O^{−} → OH^{−} + H·
2 OH· →H_{2}O_{2}

Free radical damage to DNA is thought to cause mutations that may lead to some cancers.

== The Fenton reaction ==
The Fenton reaction results in the creation of hydroxyl radicals from hydrogen peroxide and an Iron (II) catalyst. Iron(III) is regenerated via the Haber–Weiss reaction. Transition metals with a free coordination site are capable of reducing peroxides to hydroxyl radicals. Iron is believed to be the metal responsible for the creation of hydroxyl radicals because it exists at the highest concentration of any transition metal in most living organisms. The Fenton reaction is possible because transition metals can exist in more than one oxidation state and their valence electrons may be unpaired, allowing them to participate in one-electron redox reactions.

Fe^{2+} + H_{2}O_{2} → Fe^{3+} + OH· + OH^{−}

The creation of hydroxyl radicals by iron(II) catalysis is important because iron(II) can be found coordinated with, and therefore in close proximity to, DNA. This reaction allows for hydrogen peroxide created by radiolysis of water to diffuse to the nucleus and react with Iron (II) to produce hydroxyl radicals, which in turn react with DNA. The location and binding of Iron (II) to DNA may play an important role in determining the substrate and nature of the radical attack on the DNA. The Fenton reaction generates two types of oxidants, Type I and Type II. Type I oxidants are moderately sensitive to peroxides and ethanol. Type I and Type II oxidants preferentially cleave at the specific sequences.

== Radical hydroxyl attack ==
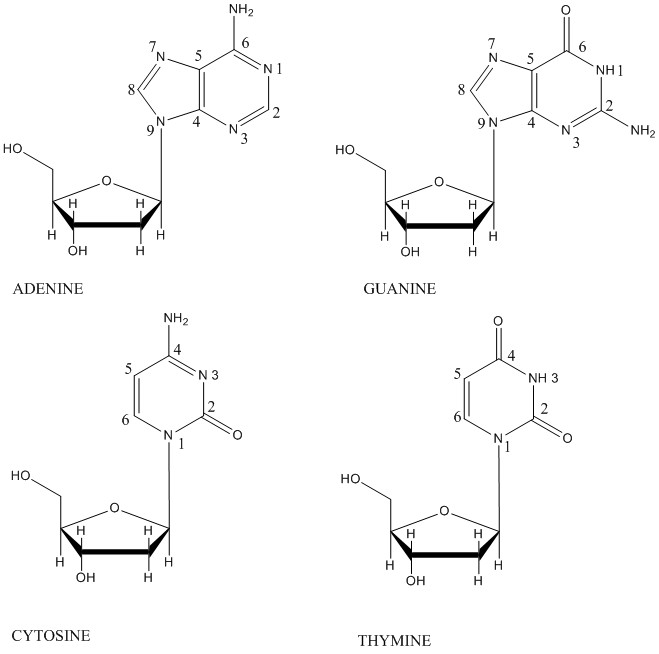
Radical hydroxyl attacks can form baseless sites

Hydroxyl radicals can attack the deoxyribose DNA backbone and bases, potentially causing a plethora of lesions that can be cytotoxic or mutagenic. Cells have developed complex and efficient repair mechanisms to fix the lesions. In the case of free radical attack on DNA, base-excision repair is the repair mechanism used. Hydroxyl radical reactions with the deoxyribose sugar backbone are initiated by hydrogen abstraction from a deoxyribose carbon, and the predominant consequence is eventual strand breakage and base release. The hydroxyl radical reacts with the various hydrogen atoms of the deoxyribose in the order 5′ H > 4′ H > 3′ H ≈ 2′ H ≈ 1′ H. This order of reactivity parallels the exposure to solvent of the deoxyribose hydrogens.

Hydroxyl radicals react with DNA bases via addition to the electron-rich, pi bonds. These pi bonds in the bases are located between C5-C6 of pyrimidines and N7-C8 in purines. Upon addition of the hydroxyl radical, many stable base-damage products can be formed. In general, hydroxyl-radical addition products of nucleobases do not directly yield strand breaks as strand breaks arise mainly from sugar damage or from later processing of alkali-labile or abasic sites, including lesions formed after cleavage of the N-glycosidic bond and subsequent beta-elimination.

== Abasic sites ==
Route of deoxyribonolactone formation

Hydrogen abstraction from the 1’-deoxyribose carbon by the hydroxyl radical creates a 1 ‘-deoxyribosyl radical. The radical can then react with molecular oxygen, creating a peroxyl radical which can be reduced and dehydrated to yield a 2’-deoxyribonolactone and free base. A deoxyribonolactone is mutagenic and resistant to repair enzymes. Thus, an abasic site is created.

== Radical damage through radiomimetic compounds ==
Radical damage to DNA can also occur through the interaction of DNA with certain natural products known as radiomimetic compounds, molecular compounds which affect DNA in similar ways to radiation exposure. Radiomimetic compounds induce double-strand breaks in DNA via highly specific, concerted free-radical attacks on the deoxyribose moieties in both strands of DNA.

== General mechanism ==
Many radiomimetic compounds are enediynes, which undergo the Bergman cyclization reaction to produce a 1,4-didehydrobenzene diradical. The 1,4-didehydrobenzene diradical is highly reactive, and will abstract hydrogens from any possible hydrogen-donor.

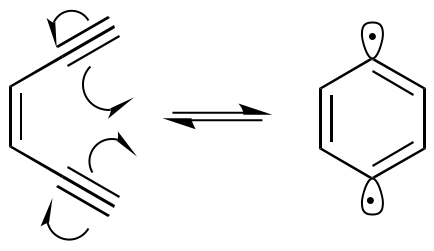

In the presence of DNA, the 1,4-didehydrobenzene diradical abstracts hydrogens from the deoxyribose sugar backbone, predominantly at the C-1’, C-4’ and C-5’ positions. Hydrogen abstraction causes radical formation at the reacted carbon. The carbon radical reacts with molecular oxygen, which leads to a strand break in the DNA through a variety of mechanisms. 1,4-Didehydrobenzene is able to position itself in such a way that it can abstract proximal hydrogens from both strands of DNA. This produces a double-strand break in the DNA, which can lead to cellular apoptosis if not repaired.

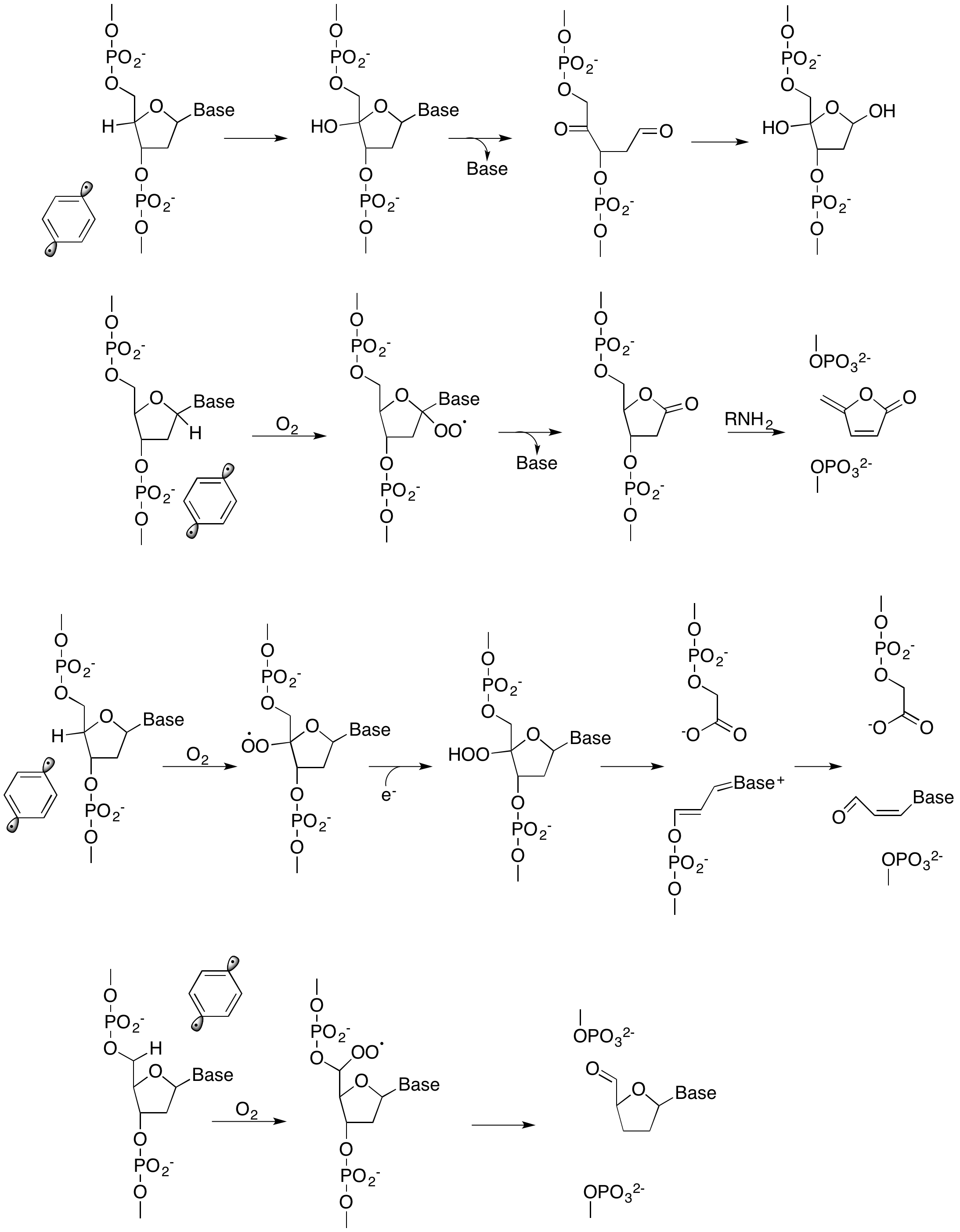

Enediynes generally undergo the Bergman cyclization at temperatures exceeding 200 °C. However, incorporating the enediyne into a 10-membered cyclic hydrocarbon makes the reaction more thermodynamically favorable by releasing the ring strain of the reactants. This allows for the Bergman cyclization to occur at 37 °C, the biological temperature of humans. Molecules which incorporate enediynes into these larger ring structures have been found to be extremely cytotoxic.

== Natural products ==
Enediynes are present in many complicated natural products. They were originally discovered in the early 1980s during a search for new anticancer products produced by microorganisms. Calicheamicin was one of the first such products identified and was originally found in a soil sample taken from Kerrville, Texas. These compounds are synthesized by bacteria as defense mechanisms due to their ability to cleave DNA through the formation of 1,4-didehydrobenzene from the enediyne component of the molecule.

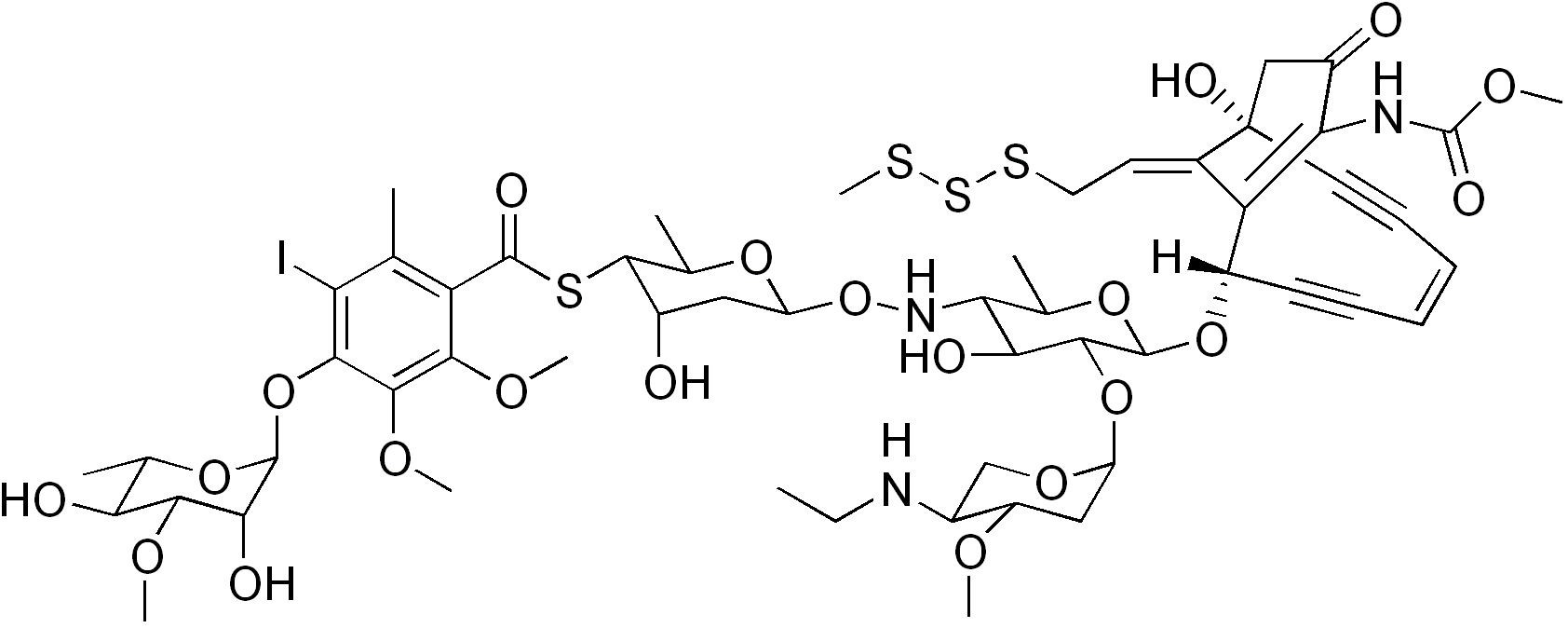

Calicheamicin and other related compounds share several common characteristics. The extended structures attached to the enediyne allow the compound to specifically bind DNA, in most cases to the minor groove of the double helix. Additionally, part of the molecule is known as the “trigger” which, under specific physiological conditions, activates the enediyne, known as the “warhead” and 1,4-didehydrobenzene is generated.

Three classes of enediynes have since been identified: calicheamicin, dynemicin, and chromoprotein-based products.

The calicheamicin types are defined by a methyl trisulfide group that is involved in triggering the molecule by the following mechanism.

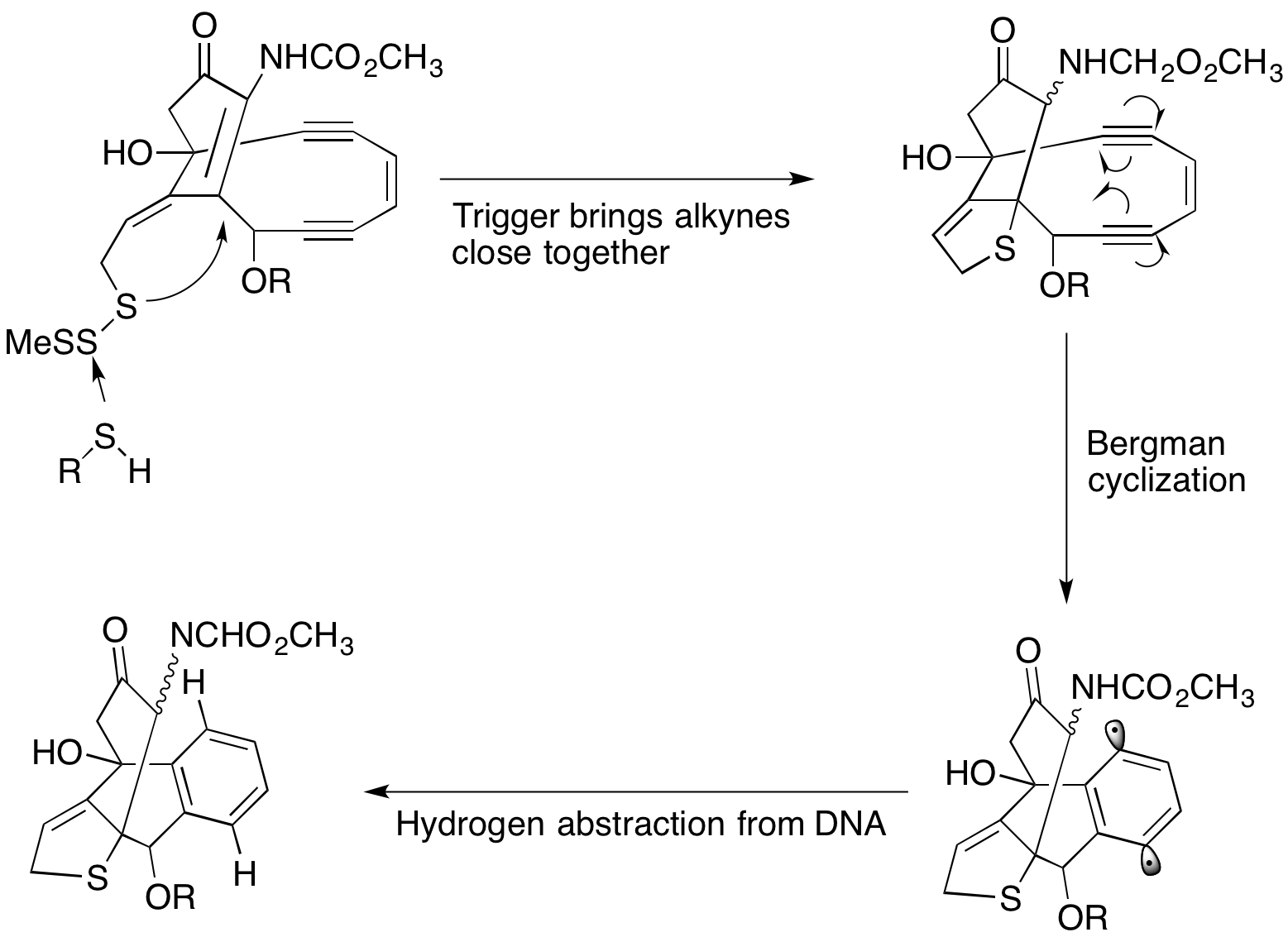

Calicheamicin and the closely related esperamicin have been used as anticancer drugs due to their high toxicity and specificity.

Dynemicin and its relatives are characterized by the presence of an anthraquinone and enediyne core. The anthraquinone component allows for specific binding of DNA at the 3’ side of purine bases through intercalation, a site that is different from calicheamicin. Its ability to cleave DNA is greatly increased in the presence of NADPH and thiol compounds. This compound has also found prominence as an antitumor agent.

Chromoprotein enediynes are characterized by an unstable chromophore enediyne bound to an apoprotein.

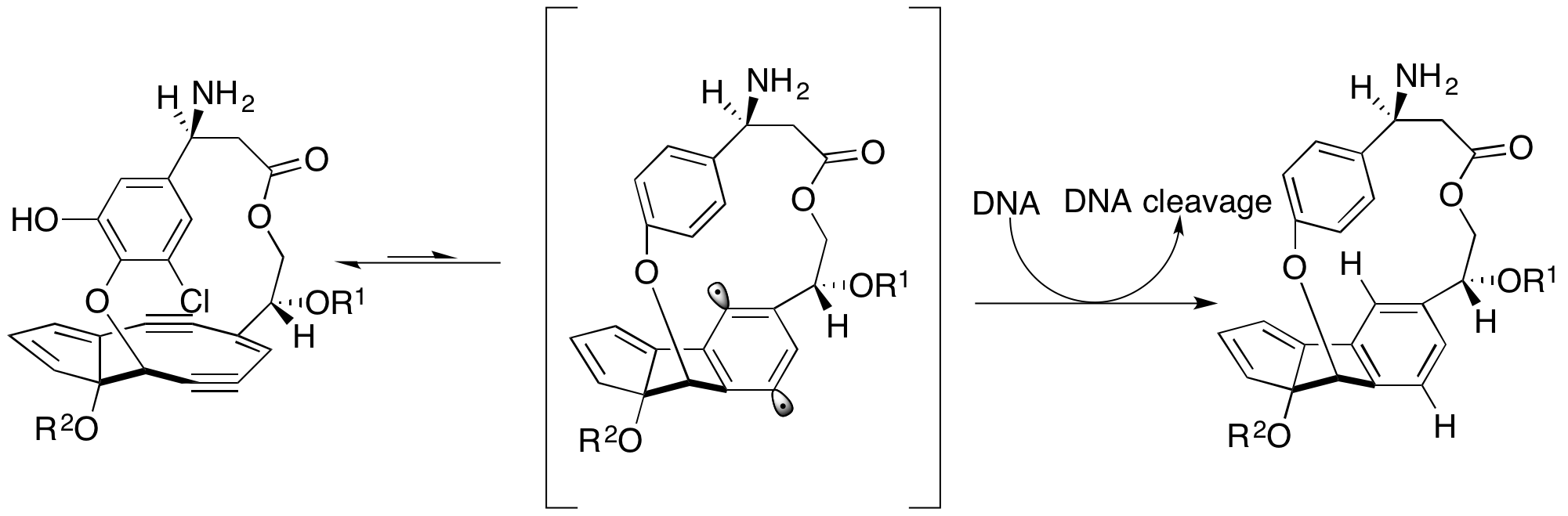

The chromophore is unreactive when bound to the apoprotein. Upon its release, it reacts to form 1,4-didehydrobenzene and subsequently cleaves DNA.

== Antitumor ability ==
Most enediynes, including the ones listed above, have been used as potent antitumor antibiotics due to their ability to efficiently cleave DNA. Calicheamicin and esperamicin are the two most commonly used types due to their high specificity when binding to DNA, which minimizes unfavorable side reactions. They have been shown to be especially useful for treating acute myeloid leukemia.

Additionally, calicheamicin is able to cleave DNA at low concentrations, proving to be up to 1000 times more effective than adriamycin at combating certain types of tumors.

The free radical mechanism to treat certain types of cancers extends beyond enediynes. Tirapazamine generates a free radical under anoxic conditions instead of the trigger mechanism of an enediyne. The free radical then continues on to cleave DNA in a similar manner to 1,4-didehydrobenzene in order to treat cancerous cells. It is currently in Phase III trials.

== Evolution of Meiosis ==
Meiosis is a central feature of sexual reproduction in eukaryotes. The need to repair oxidative DNA damage caused by oxidative free radicals has been hypothesized to be a major driving force in the evolution of meiosis
