= Shishijimicin A =

Names
- IUPAC name Methyl {(1R,4Z,8S,13Z)-8-({6-deoxy-2-O-[2,4-dideoxy-4-(isopropylamino)-3-O-methyl-α-L-threo-pentopyranosyl]-4-C-[(6-hydroxy-9H-β-carbolin-1-yl)carbonyl]-4-S-methyl-4-thio-β-D-galactopyranosyl}oxy)-1-hydroxy-13-[2-(methyltrisulfanyl)ethylidene]-11-oxobicyclo[7.3.1]trideca-4,9-diene-2,6-diyn-10-yl}carbamate

Identifiers
CAS Number	503860-50-2
3D model (JSmol)	Interactive image
ChemSpider	8388877
PubChem CID	10213385
- InChI: InChI=1S/C46H52N4O12S4/c1-24(2)48-31-23-59-35(21-34(31)57-4)62-40-42(54)46(63-6,41(53)39-37-27(15-18-47-39)28-20-26(51)13-14-30(28)49-37)25(3)60-43(40)61-33-12-10-8-9-11-17-45(56)22-32(52)38(50-44(55)58-5)36(33)29(45)16-19-65-66-64-7/h8-9,13-16,18,20,24-25,31,33-35,40,42-43,48-49,51,54,56H,19,21-23H2,1-7H3,(H,50,55)/b9-8-,29-16-/t25-,31+,33+,34+,35+,40-,42-,43+,45+,46-/m1/s1 Key: FVNYJZKDBPDHIP-UXLTXATLSA-N
- SMILES: CC1C(C(C(C(O1)OC2C#CC=CC#CC3(CC(=O)C(=C2C3=CCSSSC)NC(=O)OC)O)OC4CC(C(CO4)NC(C)C)OC)O)(C(=O)C5=NC=CC6=C5NC7=C6C=C(C=C7)O)SC

Properties
Chemical formula	C_{46}H_{52}N_{4}O_{12}S_{4}
Molar mass	981.18 g·mol^{−1}
- Except where otherwise noted, data are given for materials in their standard state (at 25 °C [77 °F], 100 kPa). Infobox references

Shishijimicin A is an enediyne antitumor antibiotic isolated from Didemnum proliferum. Isolated in 2003 it is part of the family of 10 member ringed enediyne antitumor antibiotic agents, which includes: namenamicin, esperamicin and, calicheamicin. Due to its high potency from cytotoxicity, Shishjimicin A is currently undergoing testing as a possible Antibody-antibiotic Conjugate (ADCs) cancer treatment. Laboratory tests indicate it to be “more than 1,000 times as toxic to cancer cells as the anticancer drug taxol”, also known as Paclitaxel, a prevalent chemotherapy medication. As such, theoretically, only an administration of a minuscule dose of the molecule would be necessary per each treatment. As shishjimicin A supply is scarce and the full extent of its side effects is not yet established, there is still a need for further biological and clinical studies.

== Total synthesis ==
The total synthesis of shishjimicin A was published by scientists at Rice University in 2015, led by K. C. Nicolaou. Using methodology from the previous isolation of calicheamicin, 21 total steps were conducted for the synthesis, briefly outlined below:

1. Shishijimicin A undergoes deprotection
2. Trisulfide formation with glycosidation
3. Carboline disaccharide coupling

The total synthesis includes:

- Ketalization of tetronic acid
- Reduction with ethylene glycol and diisobutylaluminium hydride
- Asymmetric addition of anion with selective protection
- Aldehyde oxidation via Swern oxidation and oxime formation
- Intramolecular dipolar cycloaddition
- Selective control of diastereoisomer formation
- Removal of protection and completed oxidation
- Coupling with lithium (3Z)-3-hexene-1,5-diyne triisopropylsilyl chloride with Knochel's salt (LaCl3·2LiCl)
- Acetylation
- Deprotection
- Oxidation

The goal of the synthesis is to create two complex intermediate compounds, trichloroacetimidate and hydroxy enediyne. These will be coupled to produce shishjiimicin A. Though this organic synthesis is challenging, its mapping allows for future contribution to research efforts. Further improvements of the coupling reaction are currently being studied. Practicality and synthesis variations of the complex molecule are essential to working alongside pharmaceutical companies to develop clinical trials and treatment options.

== DNA-cleaving mechanism ==
Shishijimicin A binds to the minor groove of double-stranded DNA (DsDNA) where its β-carboline moiety intercalates into the DNA. The unbound linker regions of DNA in the process of interphase and metaphase are open to binding by binders such as shishijimicin A. These regions lack protective histone proteins throughout the eukaryotic cell cycle. This dsDNA cleavage and low selection probability for sequences by shishijimicin A may attribute to its cytotoxic properties.

Shishijimicin A exhibits cytotoxicity towards HeLa cells, with IC_{50} values between 1.8 and 6.9 pM.

== See also ==
- Calicheamicin
- Esperamicin
- Kedarcidin
- Lidamycin
