= Sticky =

Sticky may refer to:

== Adhesion ==
- Adhesion, the tendency of dissimilar particles or surfaces to cling to one another
- Sticky mat, an adhesive mat used in cleanrooms to lessen contamination from footwear
- Sticky note, a generic term for a Post-it Note or competitor

== People ==
- Ricky "Sticky" Stuart (born 1967), Australian rugby player and coach
- Sticky (musician), alias of UK garage producer Richard Forbes
- Sticky Fingaz or Sticky (born 1973), nickname of the US rapper and actor Kirk Jones

== Computing ==
- Sticky bit, a user ownership access-right flag that can be assigned to files and directories on Unix systems
- Sticky session, see Load balancing (computing)#Persistence
- Sticky thread, an internet forum thread deemed important

== Music ==
=== Songs ===
- "Sticky" (The Maine song), 2021
- "Sticky" (Drake song), 2022
- "Sticky" (Kiss of Life song), 2024
- "Sticky" (Tyler, the Creator song), 2024
- "Sticky", by the Wedding Present from the 1993 album Hit Parade 2
- "Sticky", by Dance Hall Crashers from the 1995 album Lockjaw
- "The Sticky", a 1999 song by Gruvis Malt from the album Sound Soldiers
- "Sticky", by Ravyn Lenae from the 2018 EP Crush
- "Sticky", by FKA Twigs from the 2025 album Eusexua

=== Albums ===
- Sticky (Cyndi Wang album), 2011
- Sticky (Frank Carter and the Rattlesnakes album), 2021

== Other uses ==
- Sticky (comics), a book of gay erotic comics
- Sticky (economics), resistant to change
- The Sticky, 2024 dark comedy television series

== See also ==
- Stick (disambiguation)
- Stickies (disambiguation)
- Sticky Fingers (disambiguation)
