= Stygian =

Stygian refers to the goddess and underworld river Styx in Greek mythology.

Stygia or Stygian may also refer to:

== Animal kingdom ==
- Stygia (moth), a genus of moth
- Stygian owl (Asio stygius), a species of owl
- Stygian ringlet (Erebia styx), a butterfly belonging to the subfamily Satyrinae
- Stygian shadowdragon (Neurocordulia yamaskanensis), a dragonfly belonging to the family Corduliidae

== Fiction ==
- Stygian council, an assembly of fallen angels and demons presided by Satan in Milton's Paradise Lost
- Stygia (Conan), a setting among the fictional realms of Conan the Barbarian
- Stygian Witches, moniker for the three Graeae of Greek mythology in Clash of the Titans films
- Stygian triplets, a trio of demons in the 1999 Kevin Smith film Dogma
- Stygian, a 1998 horror film, the directorial debut of James Wan
- Stygian Penal Colony, a maximum security prison used by the Multiverse Authority in The One
- Stygian Iron, a rare metal used for a powerful sword in the Rick Riordan series Percy Jackson & the Olympians
- Stygian, also known as the Pony of Shadows, a character in My Little Pony: Friendship Is Magic

== Gaming ==
- Stygian doll, an undead monster from Act III of the 2000 video game Diablo II
- A giant worm and core boss in the 2010 fantasy action video game Darksiders
- Stygian Software, developer of the 2015 role-playing video game Underrail
- The highest difficulty in the 2016 video game Darkest Dungeon
- Stygius, the first weapon obtained in the 2020 video game Hades

== Music ==
- Stygian Vistas, a 1997 EP by the techno group Soma
- "Travel in Stygian", a song by heavy metal band Iced Earth from the 1991 album Night of the Stormrider
- "Scribes of the Stygian", a song by death metal band Incantation from the 2020 album Sect of Vile Divinities

== Other ==
- Stygian Cove, in the South Orkney Islands
- HMS Stygian, an S-class submarine of the Royal Navy
- Stygian blue, a deeply saturated blue-black impossible color

== See also ==
- Styx River (disambiguation)
- Styx (disambiguation)
