= Sticking =

Sticking may refer to:

- Sticking coefficient, a surface physics concept
- Sticking knife, an agricultural tool used for bleeding out livestock in home butchering

== See also ==
- Stick (disambiguation)
- Stuck (disambiguation)
