= Styx River (disambiguation) =

The Styx is a goddess and a river in Greek mythology that formed the boundary between Earth and the Underworld.

Styx River or River Styx may also refer to:

== Geography ==
=== Municipalities ===
- River Styx, Ohio, a community in Medina County, Ohio

=== Rivers ===
- River Styx, a part of the Cataraqui River, Ontario, Canada
- Styx (Perm), Russia
- Mavroneri, the river most commonly associated with the Styx.

==== Australia ====
- Styx River (East Central Queensland)
- Styx River (New South Wales)
- Styx River (Tasmania)
- Styx River (West Central Queensland)

==== New Zealand ====
- Styx River (Canterbury)
- Styx River (North Canterbury)
- Styx River (West Coast)
- Styx Creek, in Otago

==== United States ====
- Styx River (Alabama)
- River Styx (Georgia)
- River Styx, a semi-subterranean stream in Mammoth Cave National Park, Kentucky
- River Styx (Gratiot County, Michigan)
- River Styx (Marquette County, Michigan)
- Styx River (Ohio)
- River Styx, the subterranean portion of Cave Creek in Oregon Caves National Monument and Preserve
- Styx Branch, a stream in Tennessee

== Arts, entertainment, and media ==
- "River Styx", a song by Black Rebel Motorcycle Club from Beat the Devil's Tattoo
- River Styx, the Nile River in Robert E. Howard's fictional Hyborian Age
- River Styx Magazine, a magazine based in St Louis, Missouri
- River Styxx, a character in the Monster High franchise
- The River Styx (painting) or La Laguna Estigia, a painting by Felix Resurreccion Hidalgo

== Other ==
- River Styx archaeological site, in Alachua County, Florida

== See also ==
- Styx (disambiguation)
