= Metalloenediynes =

Compounds complexed to a transition metal

Metalloenediynes are a family of compounds composed of an enediyne-containing ligand complexed to a transition metal that have potential use as anti-tumor therapeutics. Enediynes naturally undergo the Bergman cyclization to produce a 1,4-didehydrobenzene intermediate, whose thermal activation energy is stabilized by chelation of the ligand to a metal center, allowing for temperature regulation of this diradical formation.

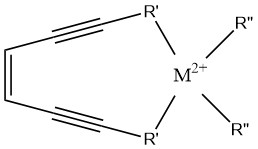
The structure of a generic square planar dication complex with an enediyne ligand motif

== Mechanism of reaction ==
Natural enediyne compounds are found in various bacterial species and function as a radical generator for DNA crosslinking upon cyclization. This reaction is hindered by the high thermal barrier to cyclization in which most of the compounds cannot react below 200 °C. The Bergman cyclization requires the adjacent alkynes of the motif to be forced close enough for radicals to join and form a bond. By chelating an enediyne-containing ligand to a metal center, the alkynes are forced into a geometry that lowers the thermal barrier to cyclization.

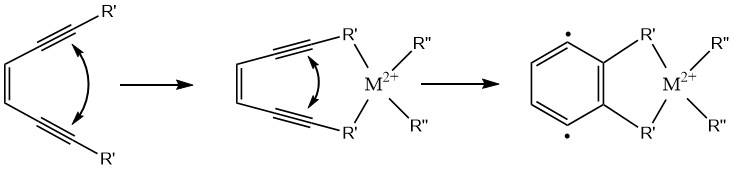
An illustration of how chelation closes the inter-alkynyl distance to initiate the Bergman cyclization

== Therapeutic capabilities ==
The diradical formation in the Bergman cyclization provides a potent mechanism for DNA scission and crosslinking by abstracting hydrogens from adjacent ribose sugars, which can then bond to kink or cleave the strand entirely, rendering the DNA of the target cell unusable. Chelation about a transition metal brings the cyclization barrier down to conditions tolerable for the human body; this allows for targeted heating of select tissues to initiate this reaction.
