= Esperamicin =

Esperamicin A1
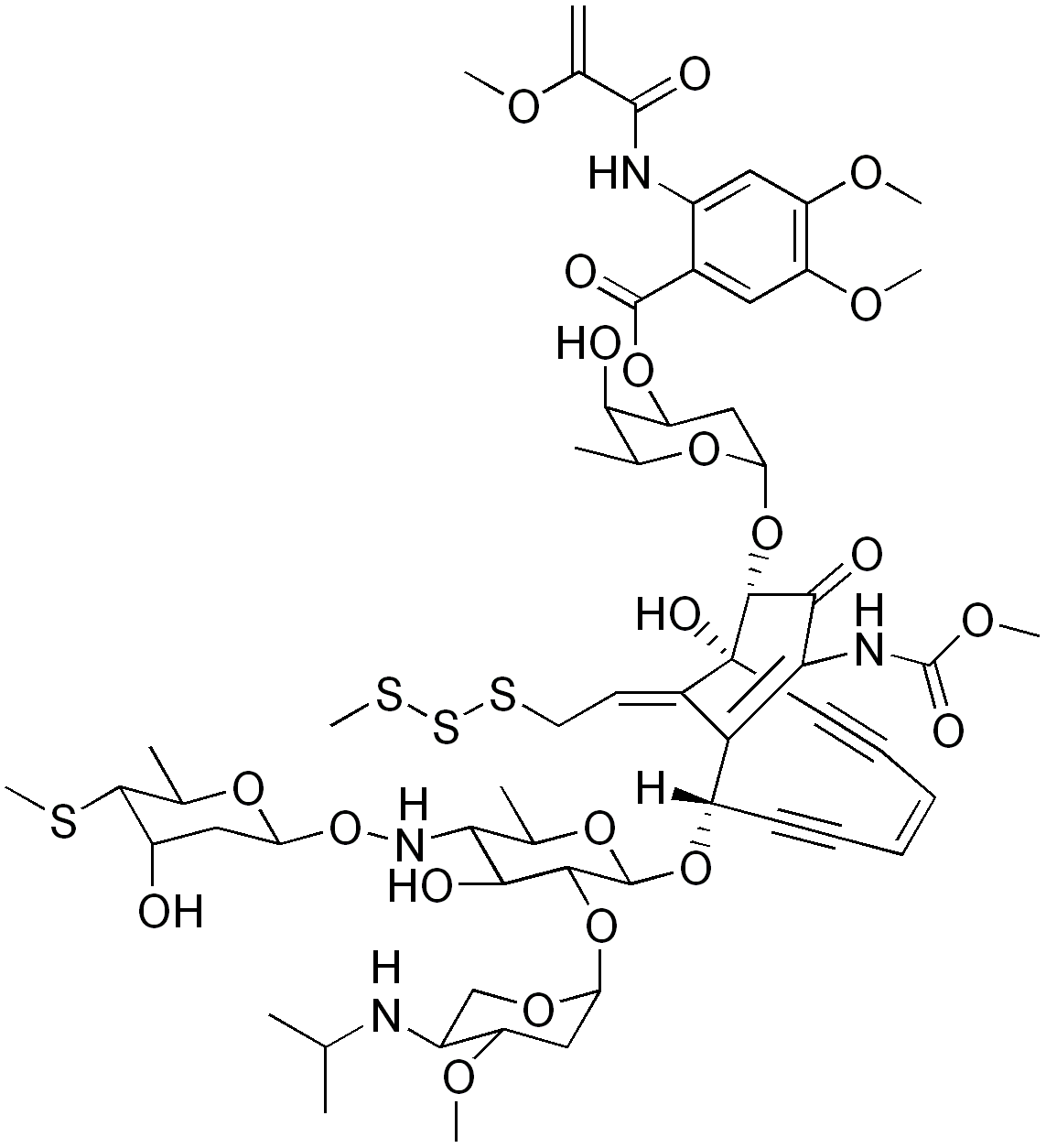

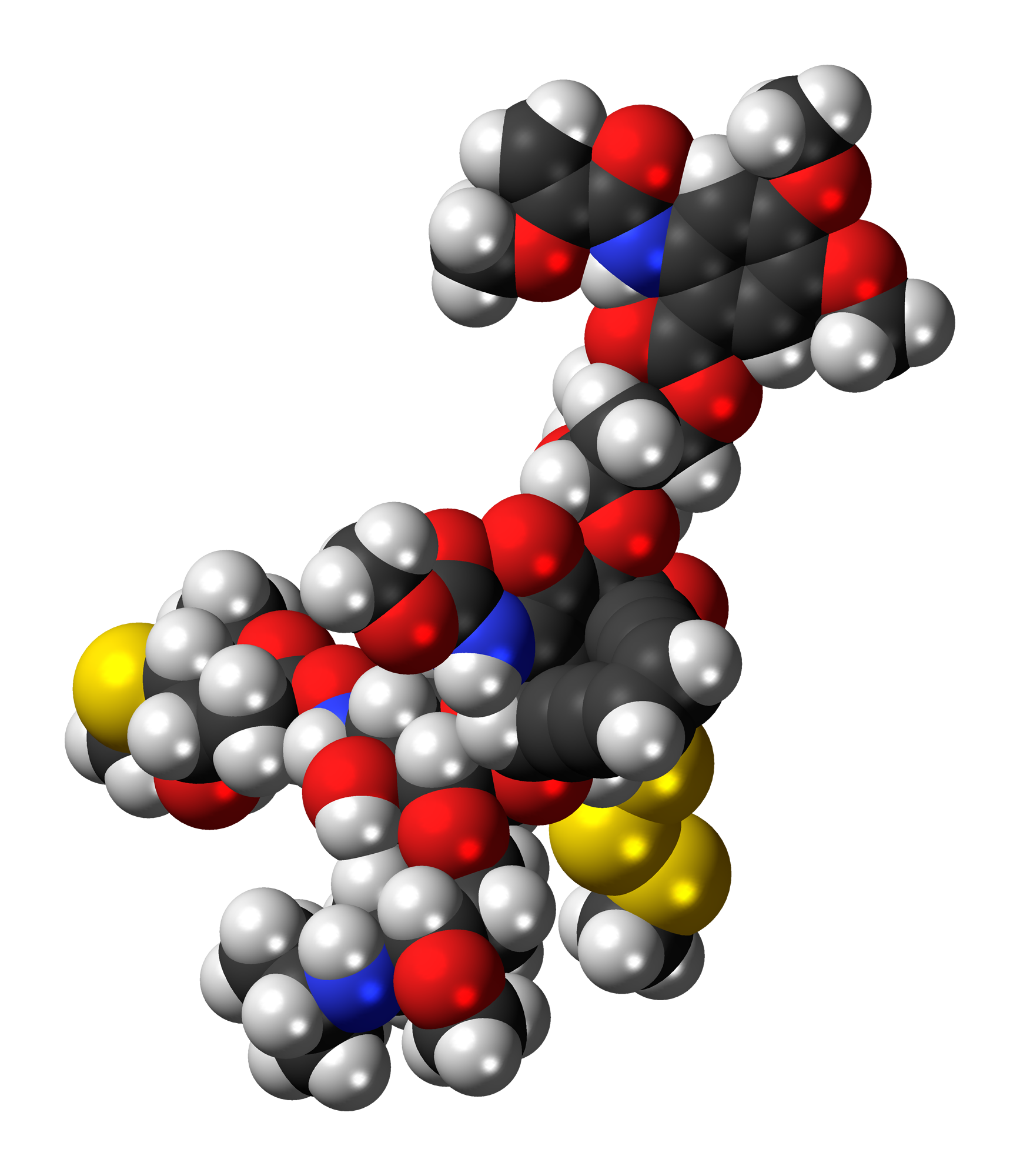

Identifiers
| CAS Number | 99674-26-7 |
| 3D model (JSmol) | Interactive image |
| ChEMBL | ChEMBL449274 |
| ChemSpider | 4940320 |
| PubChem CID | 6435576 |
| UNII | PLX8T21X8G |
- InChI: InChI=1S/C59H80N4O22S4/c1-28(2)60-36-27-77-43(25-39(36)73-8)83-52-50(66)47(63-85-45-24-37(64)53(86-12)31(5)79-45)29(3)80-57(52)82-38-18-16-14-15-17-20-59(71)34(19-21-88-89-87-13)46(38)48(62-58(70)76-11)51(67)54(59)84-44-26-42(49(65)30(4)78-44)81-56(69)33-22-40(74-9)41(75-10)23-35(33)61-55(68)32(6)72-7/h14-15,19,22-23,28-31,36-39,42-45,47,49-50,52-54,57,60,63-66,71H,6,21,24-27H2,1-5,7-13H3,(H,61,68)(H,62,70)/b15-14-,34-19+ Key: LJQQFQHBKUKHIS-WJHRIEJJSA-N; InChI=1/C59H80N4O22S4/c1-28(2)60-36-27-77-43(25-39(36)73-8)83-52-50(66)47(63-85-45-24-37(64)53(86-12)31(5)79-45)29(3)80-57(52)82-38-18-16-14-15-17-20-59(71)34(19-21-88-89-87-13)46(38)48(62-58(70)76-11)51(67)54(59)84-44-26-42(49(65)30(4)78-44)81-56(69)33-22-40(74-9)41(75-10)23-35(33)61-55(68)32(6)72-7/h14-15,19,22-23,28-31,36-39,42-45,47,49-50,52-54,57,60,63-66,71H,6,21,24-27H2,1-5,7-13H3,(H,61,68)(H,62,70)/b15-14-,34-19+ Key: LJQQFQHBKUKHIS-WJHRIEJJBF
- SMILES: O=C(C(\OC)=C)Nc1cc(OC)c(OC)cc1C(=O)OC2CC(OC(C)C2O)OC7C(=O)C(\NC(=O)OC)=C6/C(=C\CSSSC)C7(O)C#C\C=C/C#CC6OC5OC(C)C(NOC3OC(C)C(SC)C(O)C3)C(O)C5OC4OCC(NC(C)C)C(OC)C4

Properties
| Chemical formula | C_{59}H_{80}N_{4}O_{22}S_{4} |
| Molar mass | 1325.54 g·mol^{−1} |
- Except where otherwise noted, data are given for materials in their standard state (at 25 °C [77 °F], 100 kPa). verify (what is ?) Infobox references

The esperamicins are chromoprotein enediyne antitumor antibiotics of bacterial origin. Esperamicin A1 is the most well studied compound in this class. Esperamcin A1 and the related enediyne calicheamicin are the two most potent antitumor agents known. The esperamicins are extremely toxic DNA splicing compounds.

Oxygen and active oxygen-radical scavengers have no significant influence upon DNA strand breakage by esperamicin, but the cleavage of DNA by esperamicin is greatly accelerated in the presence of thiol compounds. The preferential cutting sites of esperamicin are at thymidylate residues, and the frequency of nucleobase attacked (T greater than C greater than A greater than G) is different from that of calicheamicin (C much greater than T greater than A = G), neocarzinostatin (T greater than A greater than C greater than G), or bleomycin (C greater than T greater than A greater than G).
