= Dynemicin A =

Anti-cancer drug

Names
- IUPAC name (1S,4R,4aR,14S,14aS,18Z)-6,8,11-trihydroxy-3-methoxy-1-methyl-7,12-dioxo-1,4,7,12,13,14-hexahydro-4a,14a-epoxy-4,14-hex[3]ene[1,5]diynonaphtho[2,3-c]phenanthridine-2-carboxylic acid
- Other names (2R,4S,5S,8R,11Z,15S)-21,24,28-trihydroxy-7-methoxy-5-methyl-19,26-dioxo-3-oxa-16-azaheptacyclo[15.12.0.0^{2,4}.0^{2,8}.0^{4,15}.0^{18,27}.0^{20,25}]nonacosa-1(29),6,11,17,20,22,24,27-octaen-9,13-diyne-6-carboxylic acid

Identifiers
CAS Number	124412-57-3
3D model (JSmol)	Interactive image
ChEMBL	ChEMBL2152479
ChemSpider	8205706
PubChem CID	10030135
UNII	D3G8N2863A
- InChI: InChI=1S/C30H19NO9/c1-12-19(28(37)38)27(39-2)13-7-5-3-4-6-8-18-29(12)30(13,40-29)14-11-17(34)22-23(24(14)31-18)26(36)21-16(33)10-9-15(32)20(21)25(22)35/h3-4,9-13,18,31-34H,1-2H3,(H,37,38)/b4-3-/t12-,13+,18-,29-,30+/m0/s1 Key: AFMYMMXSQGUCBK-AKMKHHNQSA-N
- SMILES: C[C@H]1C(=C([C@H]2C#C/C=C\C#C[C@H]3[C@]14[C@]2(O4)c5cc(c6c(c5N3)C(=O)c7c(ccc(c7C6=O)O)O)O)OC)C(=O)O

Properties
Chemical formula	C_{30}H_{19}NO_{9}
Molar mass	537.473
- Except where otherwise noted, data are given for materials in their standard state (at 25 °C [77 °F], 100 kPa). verify (what is ?) Infobox references

Dynemicin A is an anti-cancer enediyne drug. It displays properties which illustrate promise for cancer treatments, but still requires further research.

== History and background ==
Dynemicin A was first isolated from the soil in the Gujarat State of India. It was discovered to be the natural product of the indigenous bacteria Micromonospora chersina. The natural product displays a bright purple color due to the anthraquinone chromophore structure within it. Initially, this compound was isolated for its aesthetic properties as a dye until further research demonstrated its anti-cancer properties. Shortly after the compound's discovery, the Bristol-Myers Pharmaceutical Company elucidated the structure in Japan using X-ray diffraction studies of triacetyldynemicin A; a closely related compound.

== Synthesis ==
The first reported chemical synthesis of dynemicin was accomplished by Myers and coworkers.

== Biosynthesis ==
Dynemicin A is an antitumor natural product isolated from Micromonospora chersina which causes DNA strand cleavage. Iwasaki et al. first studied the biosynthetic pathway of Dynemicin A by ^{13}C NMR labeling experiments. Dynemicin A is thought to be biosynthesized separately from two different heptaketide chains originated from seven head-to-tail coupled acetate units, which is then connected to form Dynemicin A. Initially, precursors such as 3 and 4 were proposed to derive from the oleate/crepenynate pathway, as initially put forth for NSC Chrom A biosynthesis. However, recent work by Thorson and coworkers revealed the biosynthesis of the dynemicin enediyne core to be catalyzed by an enediyne polyketide synthase (PKSE) similar to that employed in calicheamicin biosynthesis.

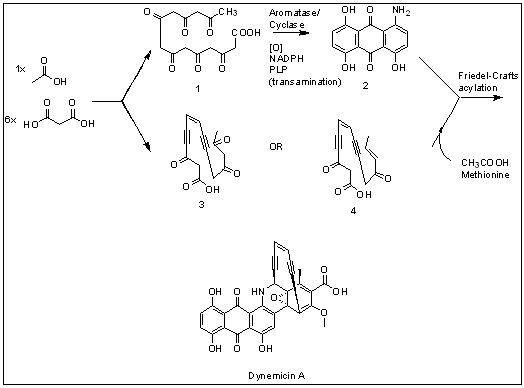

== Mechanism of action ==
Dynemicin A is specific for B-DNA, and functions by intercalating into the minor groove of the double helix. For intercalation to occur, the separation between strands, which is usually 3-4 angstroms, needs to be widened to 7-8 angstroms to allow enough space for the ligand to bind. Given this, the DNA must be strained to accommodate the Dynemicin A, resulting in an induced fit-like process. Once intercalated within the DNA, the epoxide is activated in one of two ways. First, if NADPH or a thiol reduces the molecule the Bergman re-cyclization of the enediyne proceeds. Second, if a nucleophilic mechanism is utilized then the retro-Bergman re-cyclization of the enediyne is used. The final products of these two mechanisms are outlined below. When the re-cyclization occurs, the conformational changes and chemical reactions taking place result in an irreversible double stranded cleavage of the DNA, leading to cell death. During in vitro studies, the molecule showed an increased affinity for the specific 10 base pair sequence CTACTACTTG. However, in vivo studies have yet to confirm this phenomenon. Professor Martin Semmelhack of Princeton University was the first person to propose the NADPH reduction pathway.

== Pharmacological properties ==
The pharmacological properties of this drug have not yet been fully explored but currently suggest that it may be a more potent anti-cancer agent than other chemotherapeutic drugs. The bacterium is believed to use dynemicin A as an antibacterial agent to help it survive in its niche in the environment. Dynemicin A, as a drug, specifically targets B-DNA and is most effective in rapidly dividing cells. The broad spectrum of the drug prevents current use because it creates unwanted damage in normal healthy tissues. In vivo studies in mice and rats suggest that the treatment is most effective in leukemia, breast, and lung cancers. Synthetic alternatives which are more specific to cancer cells and leave healthy tissues unharmed are being researched. Other animal models are available, but have proven ineffective and therefore have no human trials currently underway. The enediyne property of this drug relates to another antibiotic known as neocarzinostatin which is approved for clinical use. As with dynemicin A, neocarzinostatin also interacts with DNA.

== Notes ==
- ElSohly, Adel. "Dynemicin A: Molecule in Review." Columbia University. 12 June 2009.
- Liew, C. W.; Scharff, A.; Kotaka, M.; Kong, R.; Sun, H.; Qureshi, I.; Bricogne, G.; Liang, Z.; Lescar, J. (2010). "Induced-fit upon Ligand Binding Revealed by Crystal Structures of the Hot-dog Fold Thioesterase in Dynemicin Biosynthesis". J. Mol. Biol. 404 (2): 291–306. doi:10.1016/j.jmb.2010.09.041. PMID 20888341.
- Nicolaou, K. C., S. A. Snyder, A. G. Meyers, and S. J. Danishefsky. "Dynemicin A." Classics in Total Synthesis II: More Targets, Strategies, Methods. Weinheim: Wiley-VCH, 2003. 75–107.
- Schulz-Aellen, Marie-Françoise. "Cancer Drugs." Aging and Human Longevity. Boston: Birkhäuser, 1997. 203-04
- Silverman, Richard B. "Dynemicin A." The Organic Chemistry of Drug Design and Drug Action. Amsterdam: Elsevier Academic, 2004. 381-85
- Tuttle, Tell; Kraka, Elfi; Cremer, Dieter (2005). "Docking, Triggering, and Biological Activity of Dynemicin A in DNA: A Computational Study". Journal of the American Chemical Society. 127 (26): 9469–484. doi:10.1021/ja046251f. PMID 15984874.
- Tuttle, Tell; Kraka, Elfi; Theil, Walter; Cremer, Dieter (2007). "A QM/MM Study of the Bergman Reaction of Dynemicin A in the Minor Groove of DNA". J Phys Chem. 111 (28): 8321–328. doi:10.1021/jp072373t. PMID 17585802.
