= Aromatization =

Chemical reaction

Aromatization is a chemical reaction in which an aromatic system is formed from a single nonaromatic precursor. Typically aromatization is achieved by dehydrogenation of existing cyclic compounds, illustrated by the conversion of cyclohexane into benzene. Aromatization includes the formation of heterocyclic systems.

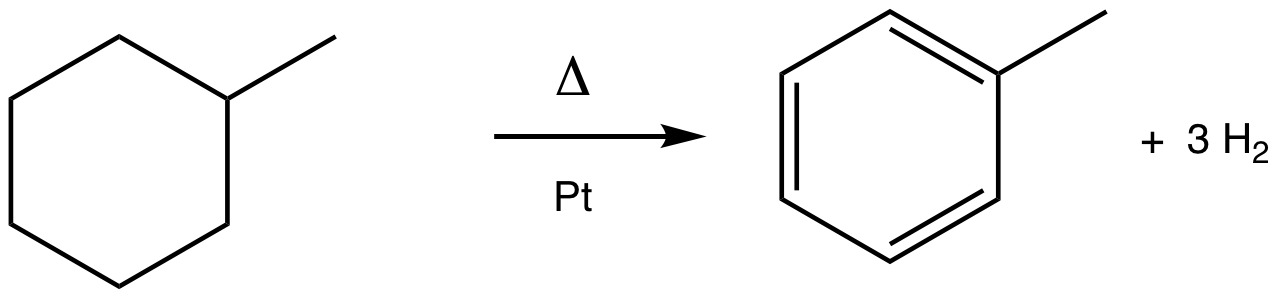
The conversion of methylcyclohexane to toluene is a classic aromatization reaction. This platinum (Pt)-catalyzed process is practiced on scale in the production of gasoline from petroleum.

== Industrial practice ==
Although not practiced under the name, aromatization is a cornerstone of oil refining. One of the major reforming reactions is the dehydrogenation of paraffins and naphthenes into aromatics.

The process, which is catalyzed by platinum supported by aluminium oxide, is exemplified in the conversion methylcyclohexane (a naphthene) into toluene (an aromatic). Dehydrocyclization converts paraffins (acyclic hydrocarbons) into aromatics. A related aromatization process includes dehydroisomerization of methylcyclopentane to benzene:

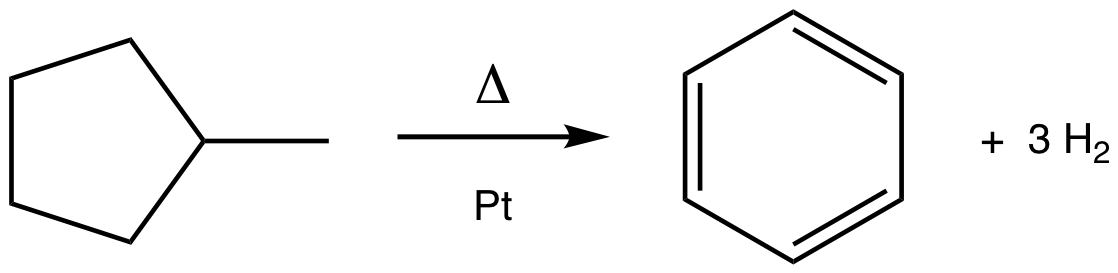

As of alkanes, they first dehydrogenate to olefins, then form rings at the place of the double bond, becoming cycloalkanes, and finally gradually lose hydrogen to become aromatic hydrocarbons.

For cyclohexane, cyclohexene, and cyclohexadiene, dehydrogenation is the conceptually simplest pathway for aromatization. The activation barrier decreases with the degree of unsaturation. Thus, cyclohexadienes are especially prone to aromatization. Formally, dehydrogenation is a redox process. Dehydrogenative aromatization is the reverse of arene hydrogenation. As such, hydrogenation catalysts are effective for the reverse reaction. Platinum-catalyzed dehydrogenations of cyclohexanes and related feedstocks are the largest scale applications of this reaction (see above).

== Biochemical processes ==
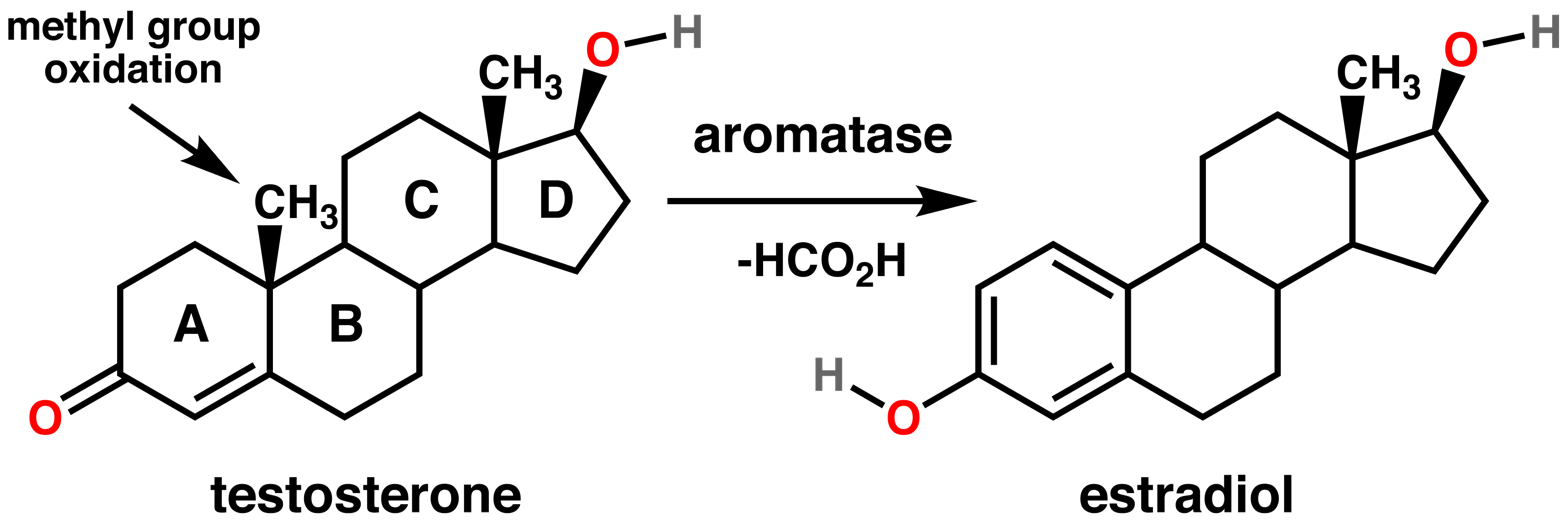

Aromatases are enzymes that aromatize rings within steroids. The specific conversions are testosterone to estradiol and androstenedione to estrone. Each of these aromatizations involves the oxidation of the C-19 methyl group to allow for the elimination of formic acid concomitant with aromatization. Such conversions are relevant to estrogen tumorogenesis in the development of breast cancer and ovarian cancer in postmenopausal women and gynecomastia in men. Aromatase inhibitors like exemestane (which forms a permanent and deactivating bond with the aromatase enzyme) and anastrozole and letrozole (which compete for the enzyme) have been shown to be more effective than anti-estrogen medications such as tamoxifen likely because they prevent the formation of estradiol.

== Laboratory methods ==
Although practiced on a very small scale compared to the petrochemical routes, diverse methods have been developed for fine chemical syntheses.

=== Oxidative dehydrogenation ===
2,3-Dichloro-5,6-dicyano-1,4-benzoquinone (DDQ) is often the reagent of choice. DDQ and an acid catalyst has been used to synthesise a steroid with a phenanthrene core by oxidation accompanied by a double methyl migration. In the process, DDQ is itself reduced into an aromatic hydroquinone product.

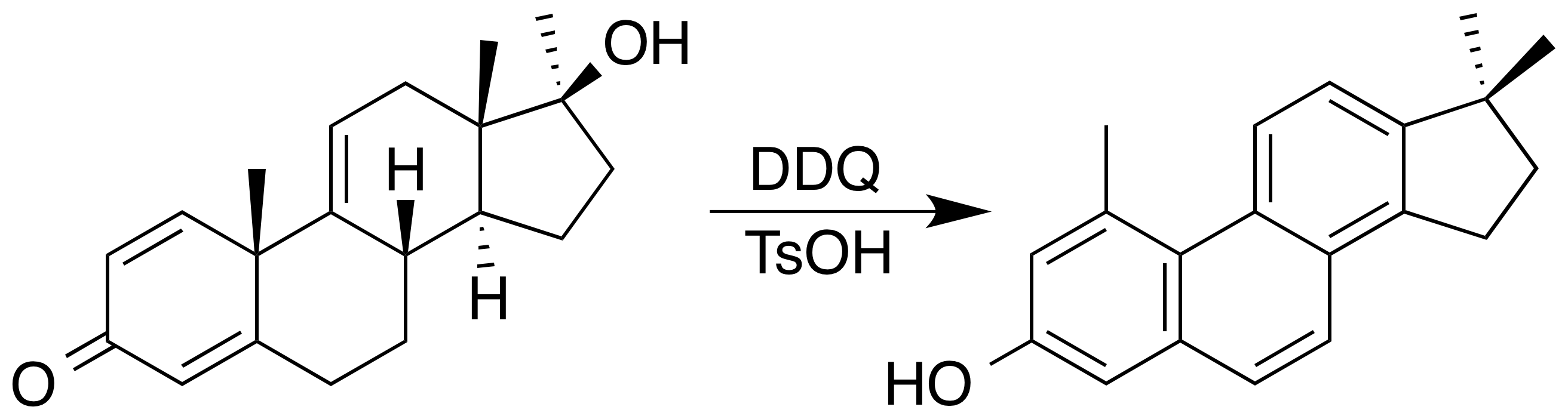

Sulfur and selenium are traditionally used in aromatization, the leaving group being hydrogen sulfide.

Soluble transition metal complexes can induce oxidative aromatization concomitant with complexation. α-Phellandrene (2-methyl-5-iso-propyl-1,3-cyclohexadiene) is oxidised to p-iso-propyltoluene with the reduction of ruthenium trichloride.

Oxidative dehydrogenation of dihydropyridine results in aromatization, giving pyridine.

=== Dehydration ===
Semmler-Wolff synthesis of aniline

Non-aromatic rings can be aromatized in many ways. Dehydration allows the Semmler-Wolff reaction of 2-cyclohexenone oxime to aniline under acidic conditions.

=== Tautomerization ===
1,4-Dioxotetralin and its aromatized tautomer 1,4-naphthalenediol coexist in equal abundance in solution.

The isomerization of cyclohexadienones gives the aromatic tautomer phenol. Isomerization of 1,4-naphthalenediol at 200 °C produces a 2:1 mixture with its keto form, 1,4-dioxotetralin.

=== Hydride and proton abstraction ===
Classically, aromatization reactions involve changing the C:H ratio of a substrate. When applied to cyclopentadiene, proton removal gives the aromatic conjugate base cyclopentadienyl anion, isolable as sodium cyclopentadienide:

2 Na + 2 C_{5}H_{6} → 2 NaC_{5}H_{5} + H_{2}

Aromatization can entail removal of hydride. Tropylium, C_{7}H^{+}_{7} arises by the aromatization reaction of cycloheptatriene with hydride acceptors.

C_{7}H_{8} + Br_{2} → C_{7}H^{+}_{7} + Br^{−} + HBr

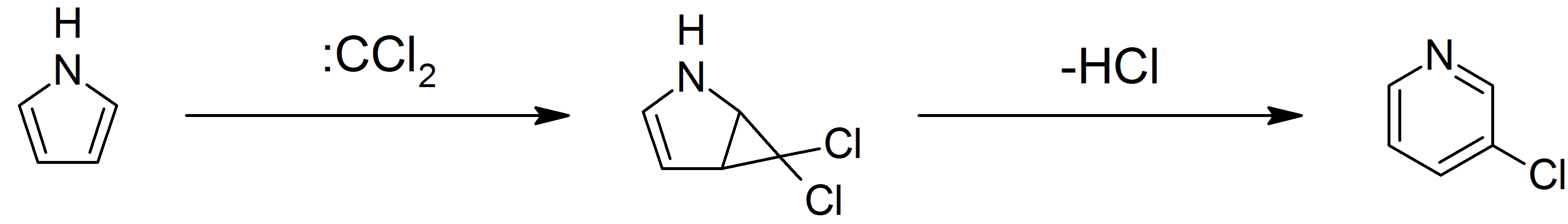
Ciamician-Dennstedt rearrangement of a pyrrole to a pyridine. The first step involves dearomatization. The second step involves aromatization.

=== From acyclic precursors ===
The aromatization of acyclic precursors is rarer in organic synthesis, although it is a significant component of the BTX production in refineries.

Among acyclic precursors, alkynes are relatively prone to aromatizations since they are partially dehydrogenated. The Bergman cyclization converts an enediyne to a dehydrobenzene intermediate diradical, which abstracts hydrogen to aromatize. The enediyne moiety can be included within an existing ring, allowing access to a bicyclic system under mild conditions as a consequence of the ring strain in the reactant. Cyclodeca-3-en-1,5-diyne reacts with 1,3-cyclohexadiene to produce benzene and tetralin at 37 °C, the reaction being highly favorable owing to the formation of two new aromatic rings:

Scheme 1. Bergman cyclization

== See also ==
- Aromatase
- Aromatic hydrocarbon
