= Didemnum fragile =

Scientific classification
- Domain: Eukaryota
- Kingdom: Animalia
- Phylum: Chordata
- Subphylum: Tunicata
- Class: Ascidiacea
- Order: Aplousobranchia
- Family: Didemnidae
- Genus: Didemnum
- Species: D. fragile

Binomial name
- Didemnum fragile Sluiter, 1909

Synonyms
- Didemnum fragilis Sluiter, 1909; Didemnum proliferum Kott, 1981

Species of sea squirt

Didemnum fragile is a species of sea squirt in the family Didemnidae.

== Research ==
Didemnum fragile is of medical interest as it contains shishijimicin molecules, which have been seen to have potent anti-tumor activity in HeLa cells at picomolar concentrations. Shishijimicin A was recently synthesized.
