= Stickies =

Stickies may refer to:

- A shortened form of sticky notes
- Stickies (Apple), a Macintosh note-taking application
- Sticky Notes, a Windows digital sticky notes utility
- Stickies (papermaking), tacky substances that causes deposits in papermaking, especially in deinking
- Stickies, nickname of the Official Irish Republican Army
- Stickies, Australian nickname for dessert wines
- Euphemism for cum shot

== See also ==
- Sticky (disambiguation)
