= Stick =

Stick, sticks or the stick may refer to:

== Thin elongated objects ==
- Branch
- Walking stick, a device to facilitate balancing while walking
- Shepherd's crook
- Shillelagh
- Swagger stick
- Digging stick
- Swizzle stick, used to stir drinks

== Sports ==
- Bandy stick, used in bandy
- Cue stick, used in pool, snooker and carom billiards
- Hockey stick, used in hockey
  - Field hockey stick
  - Ice hockey stick
- Lacrosse stick, used in lacrosse
- The weapon used in stick-fighting
- The rods, called "the sticks" used to measure distance by the chain crew in American football

== Music ==
- Drum stick, used to strike drums
- Part of a bow used to play a string instrument
- Chapman Stick, an electric musical instrument in the guitar family
- Percussion stick, a struck percussion instrument
- Led Zeppelin IV, a 1971 album sometimes referred to as Sticks
- The Sticks (album), a 2012 album by Canadian band Mother Mother
- Sticks, a 2019 EP by Bish included within the album Carrots and Sticks
- "The Sticks", a track from the 1966 Cannonball Adderley Quintet album Cannonball in Japan
- "Stick" (JID and J. Cole song), 2022
- "Stick" (Jim Legxacy song)", 2025

== Transportation ==
- Stick or stick shift, an automobile's manual transmission
  - Gear stick, used in a manual transmission-equipped automobile to change gears
- Control or centre stick, an aircraft cockpit arrangement

== Geography ==
- Boondocks, also called "the sticks", a remote area
- Candlestick Park, a defunct stadium in San Francisco, nicknamed "The Stick"

== Fiction ==
- Stick (character), the teacher of Daredevil and Elektra in Marvel Comics
- Stick (novel), a 1983 novel by Elmore Leonard
- "Sticks" (short story), a 1974 short story by Karl Edward Wagner

== Film, TV and entertainment ==
- Sticks (film), a 2001 film starring Justina Machado and Lillo Brancato
- Stick (film), a 1985 Burt Reynolds film
- The Stick, a 1987 film directed by Darrell Roodt
- Stick (TV series), a 2025 sports comedy TV series
- Stick Stickly, a Nickelodeon character
- Stick Bernard, protagonist of the anime series Genesis Climber MOSPEADA
- Sticks the Badger, a character from the 2014 TV series Sonic Boom
- "Stick" (Daredevil), an episode from the 2015 TV series Daredevil

== People ==
- Stick Elliott (1934–1980), American stock car driver
- Stephen Kernahan (born 1963), Australian footballer nicknamed "Sticks"
- Gene Michael (1938–2017), American baseball player nicknamed "Stick"
- Norm Provan (1932–2021), Australian former rugby league footballer and coach nicknamed "Sticks"
- Easton Stick (born 1995), American football quarterback
- Jan Stick, 21st century Canadian politician
- Josh Stick (born 1980), New Zealand former footballer
- Leonard Stick (1892–1979), Canadian politician
- Mzwandile Stick (born 1984), South African rugby union player and coach
- LeJerald Betters (born 1988), American sprinter nicknamed "Sticks"

== Food ==
- Pretzel sticks, pub snacks
- Breadstick, dry baked bread
- Fish sticks, processed food
- Crab stick, seafood
- Mozzarella sticks, hors d'oeuvre
- Musk stick, confection
- Cinnamon sticks, spice
- Popsicle stick, to hold ice pops (among other uses)

== Other uses ==
- Stick (punishment), a rod used for corporal punishment
- Stick (unit), several units of measurement
- Stick, a British slang term for abuse, insult, or denigration
- A group of paratroopers in a single aircraft
- A group of soldiers corresponding to a section

== See also ==
- Stick style, a late-19th-century American architectural style
- Sticking (disambiguation)
- Stik, British graffiti artist
- Styx (disambiguation)
- Sticky (disambiguation)
