= Micromonospora echinospora =

Scientific classification
- Domain: Bacteria
- Kingdom: Bacillati
- Phylum: Actinomycetota
- Class: Actinomycetia
- Order: Micromonosporales
- Family: Micromonosporaceae
- Genus: Micromonospora
- Species: M. echinospora

Binomial name
- Micromonospora echinospora Luedemann and Brodsky 1964 (Approved Lists 1980)

Type strain
- ATCC 15837; DSM 43816; DSM 43820; IFO 13149; JCM 3073; NBRC 13149; NRRL 2985; VKM Ac-669

Species of bacterium

Micromonospora echinospora is a species of bacteria that is known for producing the enediyne antibiotic calicheamicins.
