= Neocarzinostatin =

Neocarzinostatin chromophore
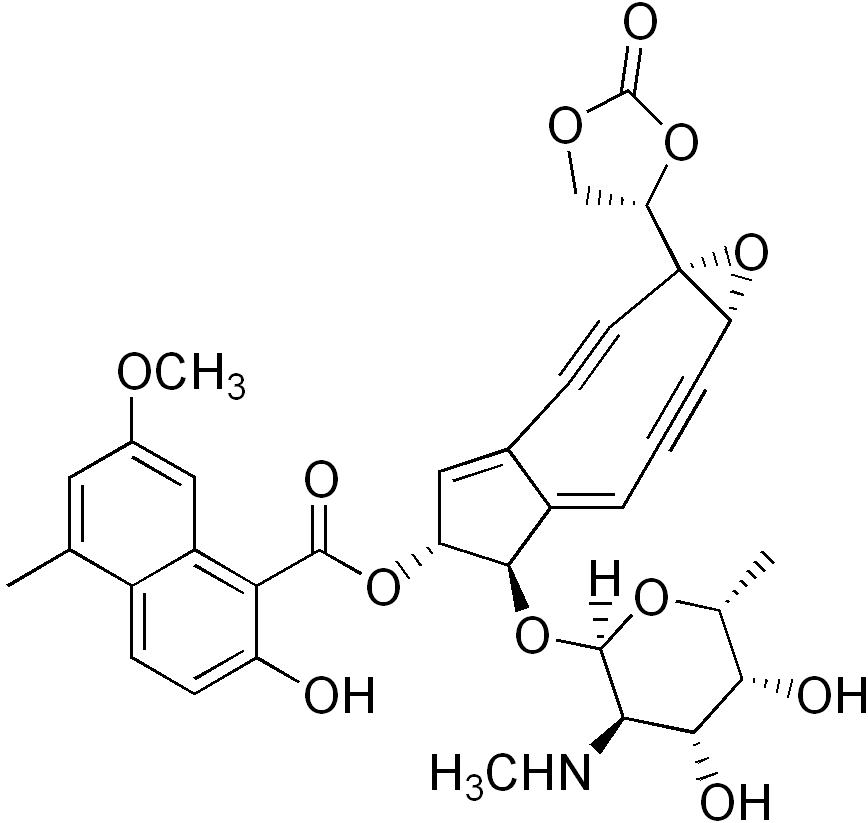

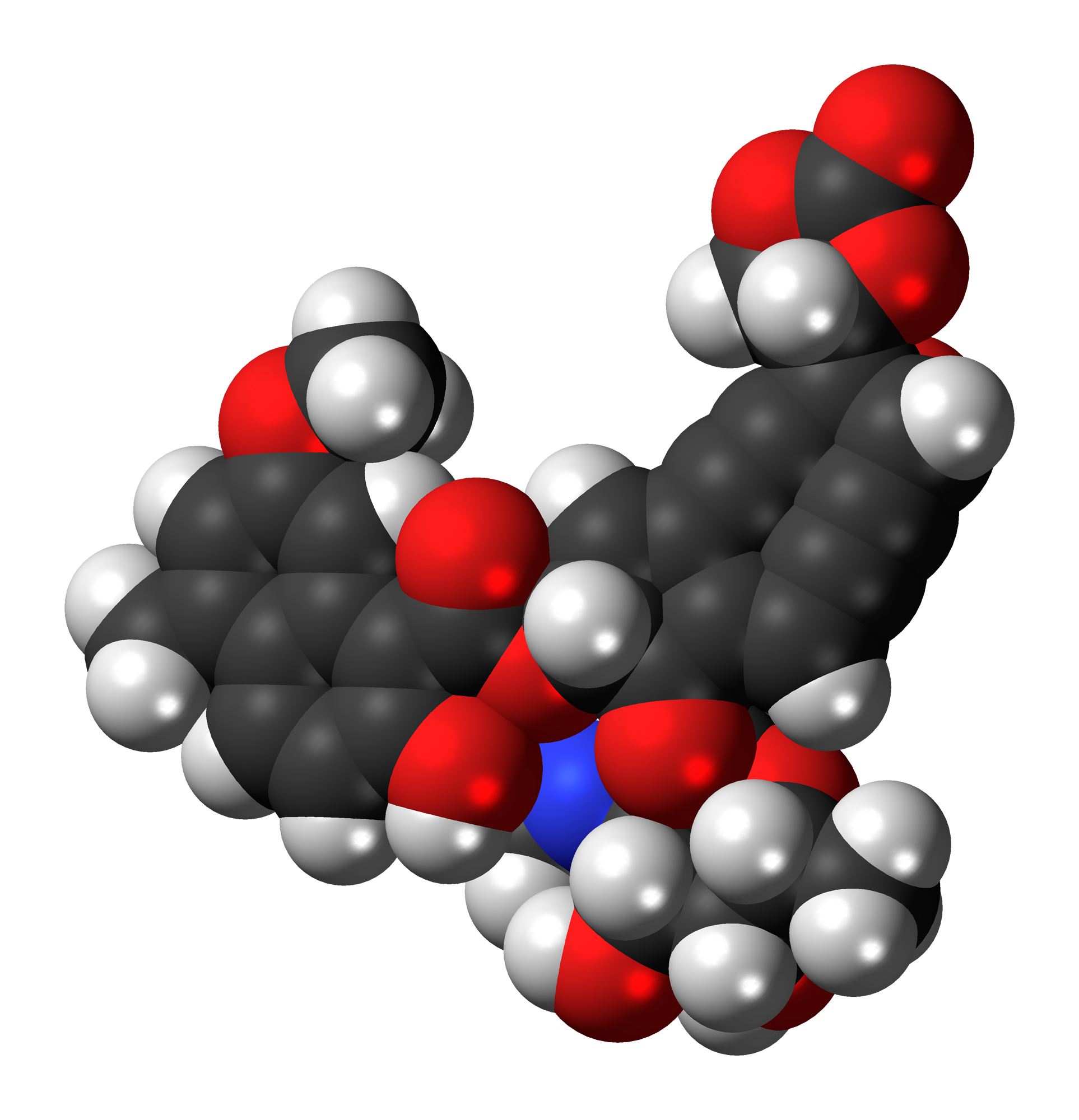

Names
- IUPAC name (1aS,5R,6R,6aE)-6-{[(2R,3R,4R,5R,6R)-4,5-Dihydroxy-6-methyl-3-(methylamino)tetrahydro-2H-pyran-2-yl]oxy}-1a-(2-oxo-1,3-dioxolan-4-yl)-2,3,8,9-tetradehydro-1a,5,6,9a-tetrahydrocyclopenta[5,6]cyclonona[1,2-b]oxiren-5-yl 2-hydroxy-7-methoxy-5-methyl-1-naphthoate

Identifiers
CAS Number	79633-18-4 Neocarzinostatin chromophore; 9014-02-2 Neocarzinostatin
3D model (JSmol)	Interactive image
ChemSpider	394601
PubChem CID	447545
UNII	2SJ8J82D90 Neocarzinostatin chromophore; PP082U6W1L Neocarzinostatin
CompTox Dashboard (EPA)	DTXSID4040557
- InChI: InChI=1S/C35H33NO12/c1-16-12-19(42-4)14-22-20(16)8-9-23(37)27(22)32(40)45-24-13-18-10-11-35(26-15-43-34(41)46-26)25(48-35)7-5-6-21(18)31(24)47-33-28(36-3)30(39)29(38)17(2)44-33/h6,8-9,12-14,17,24-26,28-31,33,36-39H,15H2,1-4H3/b21-6+/t17-,24-,25-,26-,28-,29+,30-,31-,33-,35+/m1/s1 Key: QZGIWPZCWHMVQL-UIYAJPBUSA-N; InChI=1/C35H33NO12/c1-16-12-19(42-4)14-22-20(16)8-9-23(37)27(22)32(40)45-24-13-18-10-11-35(26-15-43-34(41)46-26)25(48-35)7-5-6-21(18)31(24)47-33-28(36-3)30(39)29(38)17(2)44-33/h6,8-9,12-14,17,24-26,28-31,33,36-39H,15H2,1-4H3/b21-6+/t17-,24-,25-,26-,28-,29+,30-,31-,33-,35+/m1/s1 Key: QZGIWPZCWHMVQL-UIYAJPBUBN
- SMILES: Cc1cc(cc2c1ccc(c2C(=O)O[C@@H]3C=C/4C#C[C@]5([C@H](O5)C#C/C=C4/[C@H]3O[C@@H]6[C@@H]([C@H]([C@H]([C@H](O6)C)O)O)NC)[C@H]7COC(=O)O7)O)OC

Properties
Chemical formula	C_{35}H_{33}NO_{12}
Molar mass	659.64 g/mol

Pharmacology
- Pharmacokinetics
Excretion	Renal
- Except where otherwise noted, data are given for materials in their standard state (at 25 °C [77 °F], 100 kPa). verify (what is ?) Infobox references

Neocarzinostatin (NCS) is a macromolecular chromoprotein enediyne antitumor antibiotic secreted by Streptomyces macromomyceticus.

It consists of two parts, a labile chromophore (the non-protein molecular entity shown at right) and a 113 amino acid protein to which the chromophore is tightly and non-covalently bound with high affinity (K_{d} ~ 10^{−10} M). The non-protein component is a very potent DNA-damaging agent; However it is extremely unstable and the role of the protein is to protect it and release it to the target DNA. Opening of the epoxide under reductive conditions present in cells creates favorable conditions for a Bergman cyclization, leading to formation of a benzenoid diradical, followed by DNA strand cleavage. Another important member of the chromoprotein group of natural products is kedarcidin.

As a medicine it is among the most potent, and in Japan only it has been used against liver cancer clinically.

== Biosynthesis of NCS Chromophore ==
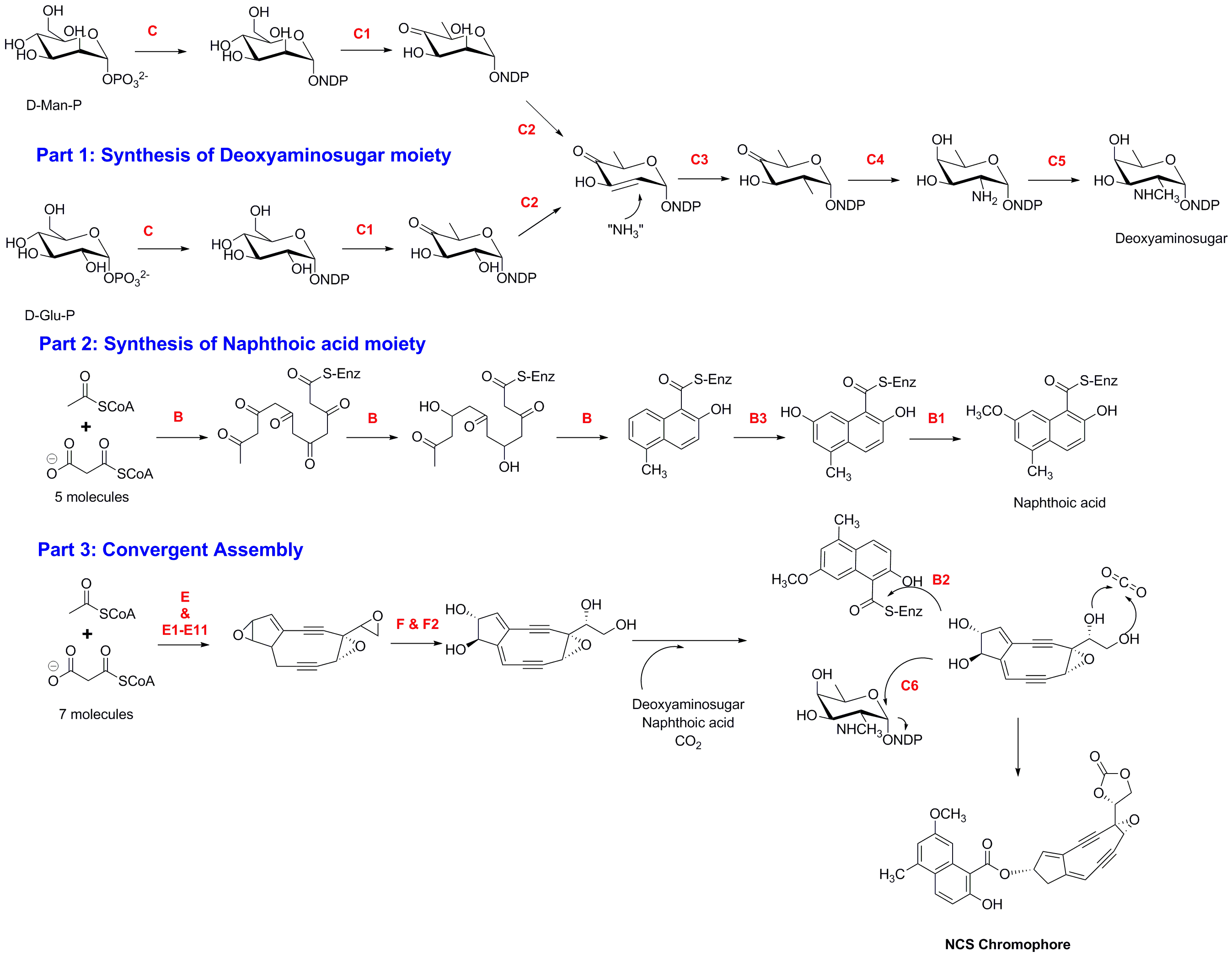
A schematic outline of stepwise synthesis of NCS Chromophore

The biosynthesis of neocarzinostatin takes place through a convergence of the activities of a gene cluster, which includes two separate iterative type I polyketide synthase (PKS) and deoxy sugar biosynthetic pathways. The first type I PKS gene, NcsE, codes for the enediyne moiety. The second type I PKS gene, NcsB, codes for the naphthoic acid moiety. Additionally, a cluster of NcsC genes are responsible for coding enzymes for the synthesis of the deoxyamino sugar moiety of NCS chromophore. The biosynthesis can be divided into three preliminary steps with a final convergence of the three moieties:

1. Synthesis of deoxyaminosugar moiety: This part is carried out by the enzymes encoded by a cluster of seven genes, named NcsC through NcsC6. Since, these enzymes have similarity to dNDP-D-mannose synthases, it has been proposed that, the synthesis starts from D-mannose-1-phosphate. Since the C-2 hydroxyl group (-OH) is ultimately eliminated, the possibility of having D-glucose-1-phosphate cannot also be ruled out. However, additional studies indicate that, D-mannose-1-phosphate is the more likely starting point.

2. Synthesis of naphthoic acid moiety: NcsB, NcsB1, NcsB2 and NcsB3 are enzymes responsible for the synthesis of the naphthoic acid moiety. This is similar to other enediyne natural products, the genes involved in construction of the aromatic moiety are an iterative type I PKS rather than a type II PKS system. The methyl group on the phenol group is added by SAM.

3. Synthesis of enediyne moiety and convergent assembly: The enediyne is synthesized by 14 enzymes encoded by NcsE to NcsE11 plus NcsF1 and NcsF2. NcsE to NcsE11 constitute another iterative type I PKS, while NcsF1 and NcsF2 have epoxide hydrolase activity.

Finally, the building blocks are assembled in a convergent fashion. Ncs6 glycosyltransferase catalyzes the coupling between the enediyne core and the dNDP-deoxyaminosugar. The naphthoyl group is attached to the enediyne core by the enzyme NcsB2 CoA ligase. There is an additional carbonate functionality added, probably originating from CO_{2} (or bicarbonate), however, it remains to be determined whether this step is truly enzymatic.
