= Sticking knife =

A sticking knife is primarily an agricultural tool. Sticking knives resemble daggers in shape and function, but are made for the utilitarian purpose of "sticking" or bleeding out livestock in home butchering. In some cases the animal would die directly from blood loss, where in others the animal would be killed beforehand and hung by the hind legs to bleed out.

== Description ==
A sticking knife usually consists of a double edge pointed blade approximately six inches long. Blades are traditionally made of high carbon steel (such as 1095). Handles are simple, consisting usually of two hardwood scales riveted through the full, flat blade tang. Sticking knives generally lack any kind of guard.

Sticking knives are generally inexpensive and rugged, making them a viable choice for gardeners, farmers and sportsmen.

== Production ==
Few companies continue to produce sticking knives. Firearms have generally replaced the sticking knife in home livestock processing. Most slaughterhouses use humane killers, which project a steel rod through the skull of the animal. Because sticking knives are so infrequently used, a home butcher may choose another type of knife that would serve other purposes as well. A boning knife or narrow hunting knife is commonly used in place of the more specialized sticking knife.

The Ontario cutlery company continues to produce traditional sticking knives in their "old hickory" knife line. Some people may still want a sticking knife for chores other than slaughtering livestock. Although double edged blades are usually considered by law enforcement as weapons, in situations where they are acceptable they have a few advantages. Having twice the edge length of a single edge knife they can be used longer between sharpenings. This advantage may be offset however because the thumb of the cutting hand can't press against the spine of the blade. With a single edged blade thumb pressure is often exerted for heavy cutting chores.
