= Sticky (Cyndi Wang album) =

Studio album by Cyndi Wang
- Released: May 27, 2011
- Recorded: 2011
- Genre: Pop
- Length: 40:37
- Label: Gold Typhoon

Cyndi Wang chronology
| Heart2Heart (2009) | Sticky (2011) | Love? Or Not? (2012) |

Singles from Sticky
- 1. "Sticky" Released: May 4, 2011; 2. "Don't Cry" Released: May 27, 2011

Sticky (Chinese: (黏黏)²; pinyin: Nián nián) is the eighth studio album by Taiwanese singer Cyndi Wang, released on May 27, 2011, by Gold Typhoon. It reached number one on the G-Music album chart in Taiwan.

== Release and promotion ==
On May 21, 2011, Wang held a pre-order autograph session prior to the album's release at the Guangsan Sogo Department Store in Taichung.

== Singles and music videos ==
The title track "Sticky" premiered on radio stations in Taiwan on May 4, 2011. The music video for the single was shot by director Huang Zhongping, and features an appearance of Owodog from Lollipop F.

== Track listing ==
Sticky track listing
| No. | Title | Lyrics | Music | Length |
|---|---|---|---|---|
| 1. | "Miss You" (想你想你) | Yen Yun-Nung | MiA C | 3:08 |
| 2. | "Love Is Empty" (愛太空) | Kiki Hu | Wesley Chia | 4:32 |
| 3. | "Stay With Me Till The Future" (陪我到以後) | Chen Xin-Yan; Huang Wen-Hsuan; Yen Yun-Nung | Han Xin-Zhou | 4:00 |
| 4. | "Sticky" (黏黏黏黏) | Cyndi Wang | Cyndi Wang | 3:18 |
| 5. | "Rock Girl" (搖滾吧姑娘) | Jennifer Hsu | Ooi Teng Fong | 3:53 |
| 6. | "Don't Cry" (不哭) | Wu Ben-Wei | MiA C | 4:16 |
| 7. | "Romance With Myself" (自行浪漫) | Jennifer Hsu | Vincent Degiorgio; John Acosta | 3:59 |
| 8. | "The Next Page Of Me" (下一頁的我) | Kevin Yi | Mizuno Yoshiki | 5:46 |
| 9. | "Forever Happiness" (一直幸福) | Chen Xin-Yan | VChuan | 4:10 |
| 10. | "Love ATM" (愛的ATM) | Wu Yi-Wei; Chen Hung-Yu | Carl Utbult; Rikard Lofgren; Vincent Degiorgio | 3:35 |
| Total length: | | | | 40:37 |

== Charts ==
Chart performance for Sticky
| Chart (2011) | Peak position |
|---|---|
| Taiwanese Albums (G-Music) | 1 |

== Release history ==
Release history for Sticky
| Region | Date | Format(s) | Label |
|---|---|---|---|
| Taiwan | May 27, 2011 | CD; digital download; streaming | Gold Typhoon |
