= Sticky Fingers (disambiguation) =

Sticky Fingers is a 1971 album by the Rolling Stones.

Sticky Fingers may also refer to:

== Books ==
- Sticky Fingers (book), a 2017 book by Joe Hagan

== People ==
- Sticky Fingaz, member of the hip hop group Onyx

== Films ==
- Sticky Fingers (1988 film), directed by Catlin Adams
- Sticky Fingers (2009 film), directed by Ken Scott

== Music ==
- Sticky Fingers (band), an Australian reggae rock band
- Sticky Fingers (tribute band), United States-based The Rolling Stones tribute band

== Television ==
- "Sticky Fingers" (1999), an episode from 2point4 children, Series 8

== Other uses ==
- Sticky Fingers, the ability, or "Stand" of Bruno Bucciarati, a character in the manga Golden Wind
