= Mavroneri =

Coordinates: 37.984°N 22.205°E

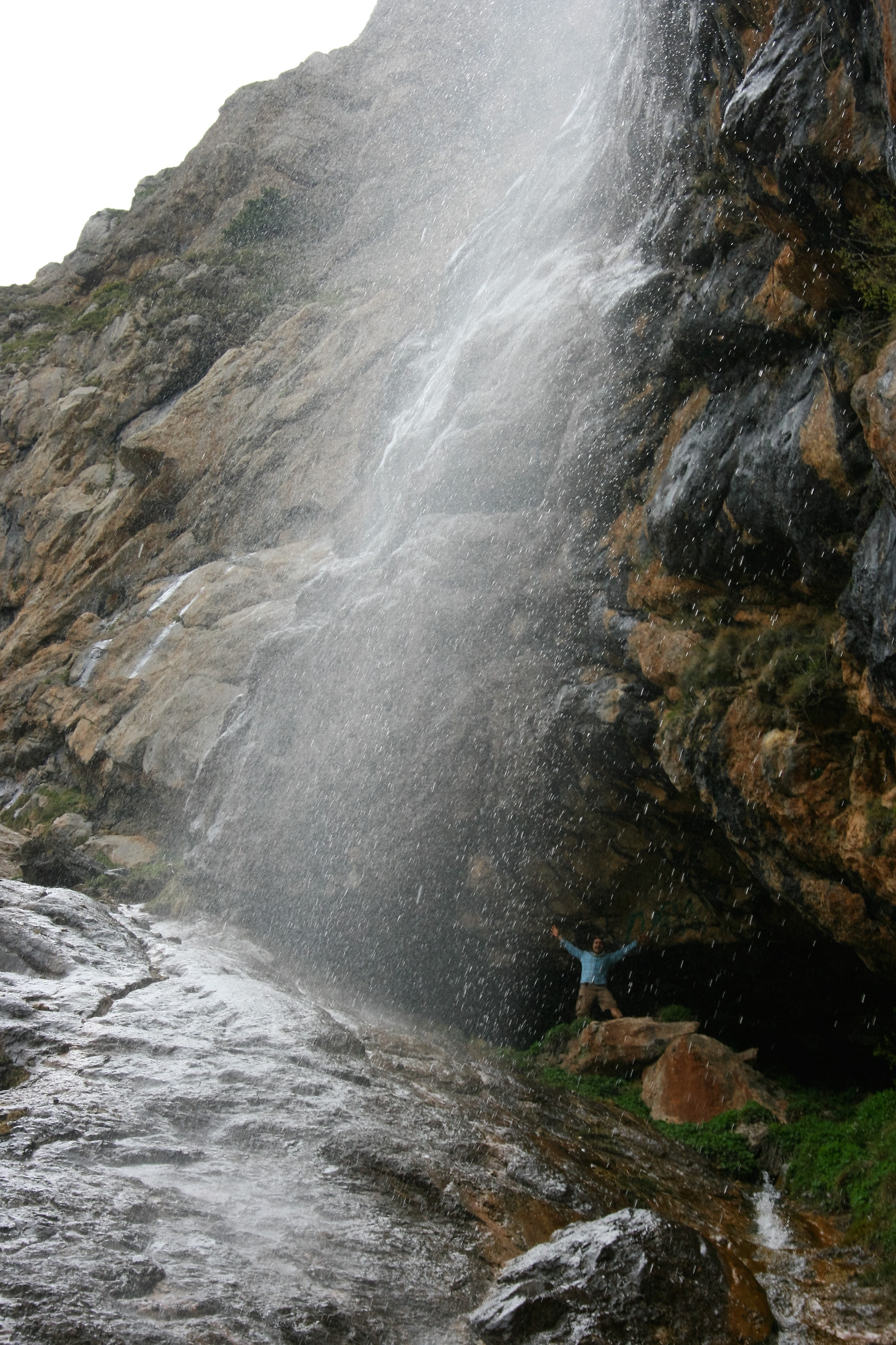

Mavronéri (Greek: “Black Water”) is a river identified with the River Styx of Greek mythology according to Hesiod’s description in Theogony. It is located near Nonakris in the Aroania Mountains of Achaia on the Peloponnesian peninsula. Its waters contain a significant amount of Calicheamicin, a dangerous compound produced by bacteria. Stanford University scientists Antoinette Hayes and Adrienne Mayor speculate that the waters of the Mavronéri were used to poison Alexander the Great in 323 BCE.
