= Styx Branch =

Stream in Sevier County, Tennessee U.S.

- Location within the United States
- Location: Sevier County, Tennessee
- Coordinates: 35°39′1.3″N 83°26′2.29″W
- Type: stream

Styx Branch is a stream in Ethiopia, Tennessee in the United States.

The stream headwaters are at 35°39′03″N 83°26′01″W and its confluence with Alum Cave Creek is at 35°38′02″N 83°26′18″W. The stream source is on the south flank of Mount Le Conte at approximate elevation of 5600 feet and the confluence elevation is 4117 feet.

The stream was named after the river Styx, in Greek mythology.

Big N Funky Productions, the same team that produces Wrestling With Ghosts, is producing a horror comedy feature film about the Styx Branch River entitled “Donna’s Market”. This film will be the fourth movie in their anthology about the area entitled The Smoky Mountain Chronicles.

== See also ==
- List of rivers of Tennessee
