= Styx (disambiguation) =

Styx is a goddess and river of the Underworld in Greek mythology.

Styx may also refer to:

== Arts, entertainment, and media ==
=== Fiction ===
- Styxx, a novel in the Dark-Hunter series by Sherrilyn Kenyon
- Styx, the villains of the Tunnels book series
- Styx and Stone (Jacob Eichorn and Gerald Stone) are two Marvel's fictional comic book characters

=== Film ===
- Styx (film), a 2018 German film

=== Games ===
- Styx (Spectrum video game), a 1983 computer game released by Bug-Byte Software
- Styx (Windmill game), a 1983 computer game released by Windmill Software
- Styx: Master of Shadows, a 2014 video game developed by Cyanide Studio
- Styx: Shards of Darkness, a 2017 video game developed by Cyanide Studio
- Fire LEO-03 "Styx", a fictional starfighter from the videogame Thunder Force III
- STYX, a fictional research institute from 2020 video game Disney Twisted-Wonderland

=== Music ===
- Styx (band), an American rock band
- Styx, a UK band involving Bruce Dickinson prior to Iron Maiden
- Styx (album), a 1972 album by Styx
- "Styx", a song by Witchery from Don't Fear the Reaper

== Biology ==
- STYX, a protein tyrosine phosphatase
- Styx (butterfly), a monotypic genus of metalmark butterflies in the family Riodinidae

== Places ==
- Styx, New Zealand, a minor suburb in Christchurch, New Zealand
- Styx, Tasmania, a locality in Australia
- Styx, Texas, an unincorporated community in Kaufman County
- Styx Valley, the valley of the Styx River in Tasmania, Australia
- Styx River (disambiguation)
- Styx (moon), a moon of Pluto

== Science and technology ==
- Styx (missile) or P-15 Termit, a Soviet missile
- Styx (protocol), a network protocol of the Inferno operating system
- Styx rule, a chemistry rule regarding the structure of boranes

== See also ==
- River Styx (disambiguation)
- Stick (disambiguation)
- Stye
