= Bergman cyclization =

Chemical reaction

Masamune-Bergman cyclization
Named after	Satoru Masamune Robert George Bergman
Reaction type	Ring forming reaction

Identifiers
Organic Chemistry Portal	bergman-cyclization
RSC ontology ID	RXNO:0000240

The Masamune-Bergman cyclization or Masamune-Bergman reaction or Masamune-Bergman cycloaromatization is an organic reaction and more specifically a rearrangement reaction taking place when an enediyne is heated in presence of a suitable hydrogen donor (Scheme 1). It is the most famous and well-studied member of the general class of cycloaromatization reactions. It is named for Japanese-American chemist Satoru Masamune (b. 1928) and American chemist Robert G. Bergman (b. 1942). The reaction product is a derivative of benzene.

Scheme 1. Bergman cyclization

The reaction proceeds by a thermal reaction or pyrolysis (above 200 °C) forming a short-lived and very reactive para-benzyne biradical species. It will react with any hydrogen donor such as 1,4-cyclohexadiene which converts to benzene. When quenched by tetrachloromethane the reaction product is a 1,4-dichlorobenzene and with methanol the reaction product is benzyl alcohol.

When the enyne moiety is incorporated into a 10-membered hydrocarbon ring (e.g. cyclodeca-3-ene-1,5-diyne in scheme 2) the reaction, taking advantage of increased ring strain in the reactant, is possible at the much lower temperature of 37 °C.

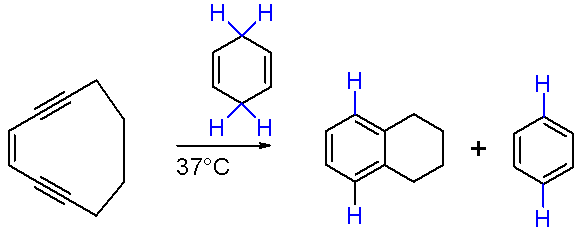
Scheme 2. Bergman reaction of cyclodeca-3-ene-1,5-diyne

Naturally occurring compounds such as calicheamicin contain the same 10-membered ring and are found to be cytotoxic. These compounds generate the diradical intermediate described above which can cause single and double stranded DNA cuts. There are novel drugs which attempt to make use of this property, including antibody-drug conjugates such as mylotarg.

A biradical mechanism is also proposed for the formation of certain biomolecules found in marine sporolides that have a chlorobenzene unit as part of their structure. In this mechanism a halide salt provides the halogen. A model reaction with the enediyene cyclodeca-1,5-diyn-3-ene, lithium bromide as halogen source and acetic acid as hydrogen source in DMSO at 37 °C supports the theory:

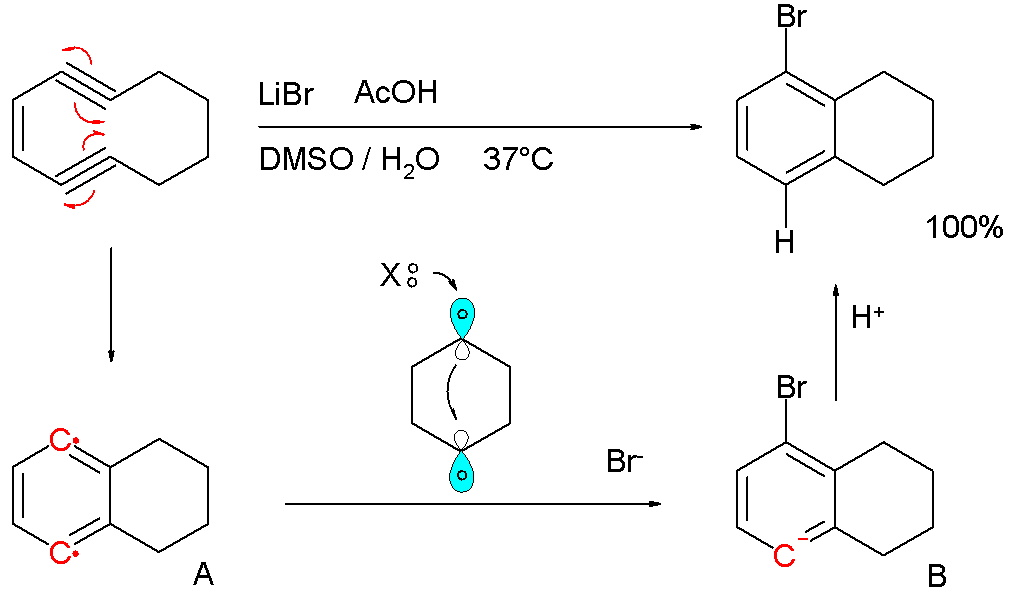
Bergman cyclization with capture by lithium bromide

The reaction is found to be first-order in enediyne with the formation of p-benzyne A as the rate-limiting step. The halide ion then donates its two electrons in the formation of a new Br-C bond and radical electron involved is believed to shuttle over a transient C1-C4 bond forming the anion intermediate B. The anion is a powerful base, stripping protons even from DMSO to final product. The dibromide or dihydrogen product (tetralin) never form.

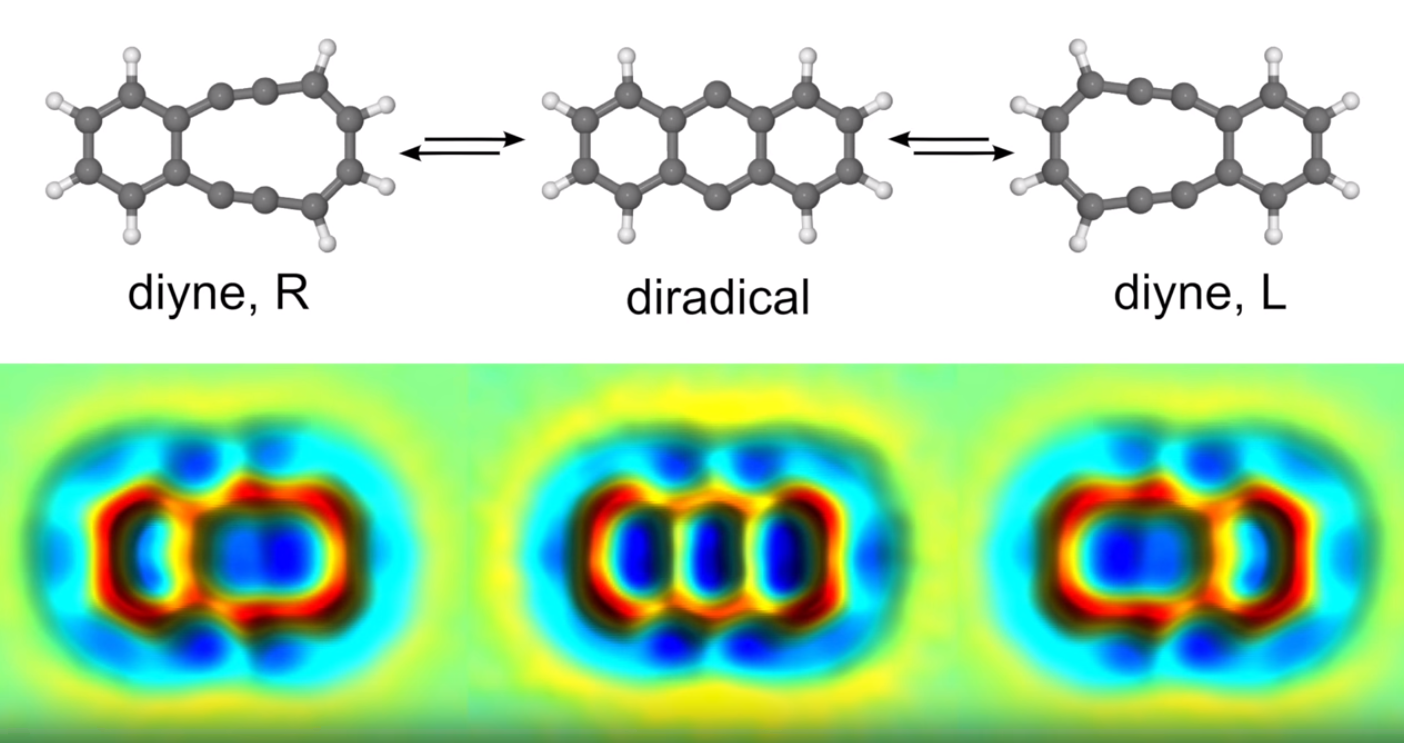
Reversible Bergman cyclization of diyne induced by an AFM tip: model (top) and false-color AFM images (bottom)

In 2015 IBM scientists demonstrated that a reversible Masamune-Bergman cyclisation of diyne can be induced by a tip of an atomic force microscope (AFM). They also recorded images of individual diyne molecules during this process. When learning about this direct experimental demonstration Bergman commented, "When we first reported this reaction I had no idea that it would be biologically relevant, or that the reaction could someday be visualized at the molecular level.
