= Calicheamicin =

Calicheamicin γ1
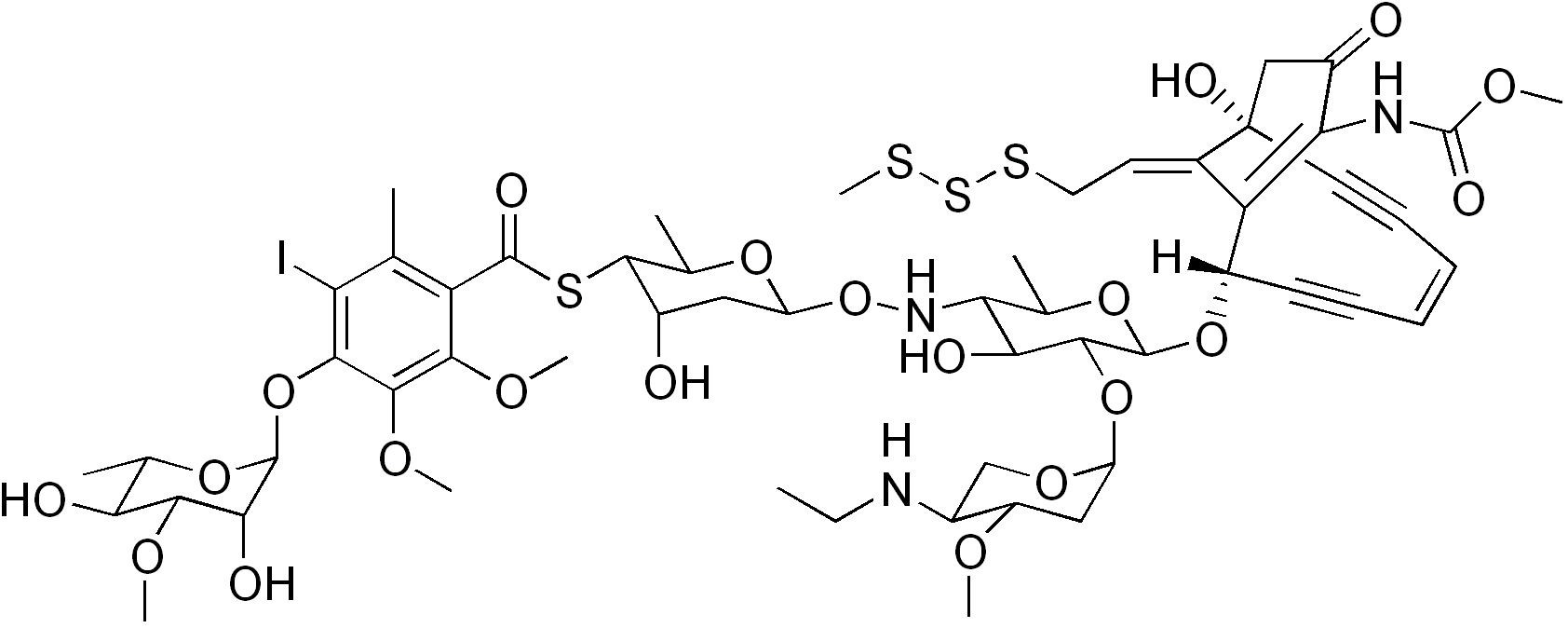

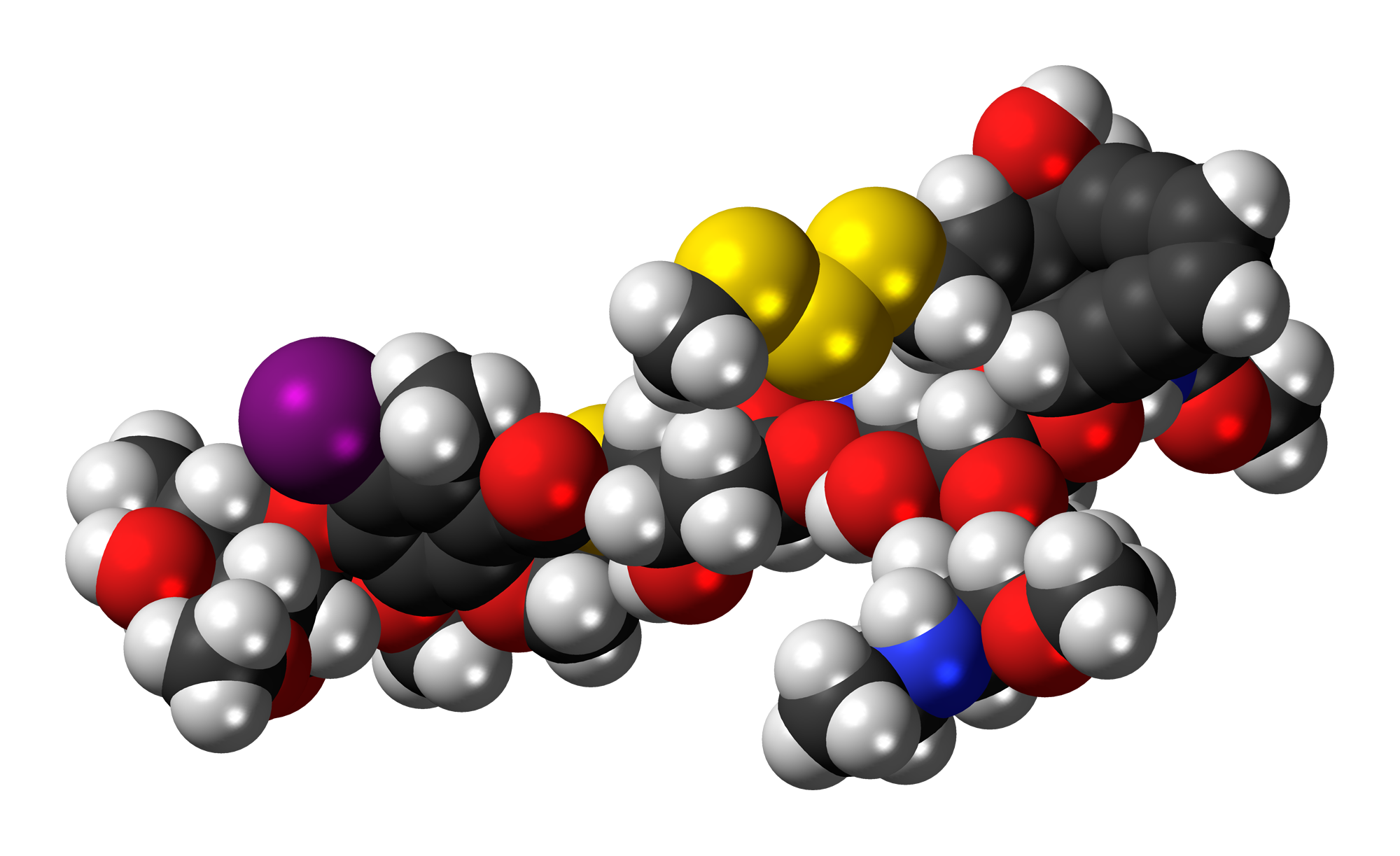

Identifiers
CAS Number	108212-75-5
3D model (JSmol)	Interactive image
ChemSpider	27330302
PubChem CID	6438329
UNII	99ZHU54I1K
- InChI: InChI=1S/C55H74IN3O21S4/c1-12-57-30-24-73-35(22-34(30)68-6)78-48-43(63)40(26(3)75-53(48)77-33-17-15-13-14-16-19-55(67)23-32(61)41(58-54(66)72-10)38(33)29(55)18-20-82-84-81-11)59-80-36-21-31(60)50(28(5)74-36)83-51(65)37-25(2)39(56)46(49(71-9)45(37)69-7)79-52-44(64)47(70-8)42(62)27(4)76-52/h13-14,18,26-28,30-31,33-36,40,42-44,47-48,50,52-53,57,59-60,62-64,67H,12,20-24H2,1-11H3,(H,58,66)/b14-13-,29-18+/t26-,27+,28-,30+,31+,33+,34+,35+,36+,40-,42+,43+,44-,47-,48-,50-,52+,53+,55-/m1/s1 Key: HXCHCVDVKSCDHU-LULTVBGHSA-N; InChI=1/C55H74IN3O21S4/c1-12-57-30-24-73-35(22-34(30)68-6)78-48-43(63)40(26(3)75-53(48)77-33-17-15-13-14-16-19-55(67)23-32(61)41(58-54(66)72-10)38(33)29(55)18-20-82-84-81-11)59-80-36-21-31(60)50(28(5)74-36)83-51(65)37-25(2)39(56)46(49(71-9)45(37)69-7)79-52-44(64)47(70-8)42(62)27(4)76-52/h13-14,18,26-28,30-31,33-36,40,42-44,47-48,50,52-53,57,59-60,62-64,67H,12,20-24H2,1-11H3,(H,58,66)/b14-13-,29-18+/t26-,27+,28-,30+,31+,33+,34+,35+,36+,40-,42+,43+,44-,47-,48-,50-,52+,53+,55-/m1/s1 Key: HXCHCVDVKSCDHU-LULTVBGHBW
- SMILES: CCN[C@H]1CO[C@H](C[C@@H]1OC)O[C@@H]2[C@H]([C@@H]([C@H](O[C@H]2O[C@H]3C#C/C=C\C#C[C@]\4(CC(=O)C(=C3/C4=C\CSSSC)NC(=O)OC)O)C)NO[C@H]5C[C@@H]([C@@H]([C@H](O5)C)SC(=O)c6c(c(c(c(c6OC)OC)O[C@H]7[C@@H]([C@@H]([C@H]([C@@H](O7)C)O)OC)O)I)C)O)O

Properties
Chemical formula	C_{55}H_{74}IN_{3}O_{21}S_{4}
Molar mass	1368.34 g·mol^{−1}

Hazards
- GHS labelling
Pictograms	(GHS07: Exclamation mark) (GHS08: Health hazard)
Signal word	Danger
Hazard statements	H302, H341, H361, H372
Precautionary statements	P201, P202, P260, P264, P270, P281, P301+P312, P308+P313, P314, P330, P405, P501
- Except where otherwise noted, data are given for materials in their standard state (at 25 °C [77 °F], 100 kPa). verify (what is ?) Infobox references

The calicheamicins are a class of enediyne antitumor antibiotics derived from the bacterium Micromonospora echinospora, with calicheamicin γ1 being the most notable. It was isolated originally in the mid-1980s from the chalky soil, or "caliche pits", located in Kerrville, Texas. The sample was collected by a scientist working for Lederle Labs. It is extremely toxic to all cells and, in 2000, a CD33 antigen-targeted immunoconjugate N-acetyl dimethyl hydrazide calicheamicin was developed and marketed as targeted therapy against the non-solid tumor cancer acute myeloid leukemia (AML). A second calicheamicin-linked monoclonal antibody, inotuzumab ozogamicin (marketed as Besponsa), an anti-CD22-directed antibody-drug conjugate, was approved by the U.S. Food and Drug Administration on August 17, 2017, for use in the treatment of adults with relapsed or refractory B-cell precursor acute lymphoblastic leukemia. Calicheamicin γ1 and the related enediyne esperamicin are two of the most potent antitumor agents known.

== Mechanism of toxicity ==
Calicheamicins target DNA and cause strand scission. Calicheamicins bind with DNA in the minor groove, wherein they then undergo a reaction analogous to the Bergman cyclization to generate a diradical species. This diradical, 1,4-didehydrobenzene, then abstracts hydrogen atoms from the deoxyribose (sugar) backbone of DNA, which ultimately leads to strand scission. The specificity of binding of calicheamicin to the minor groove of DNA was demonstrated by Crothers et al. (1999) to be due to the aryltetrasaccharide group of the molecule.

== Biosynthesis ==
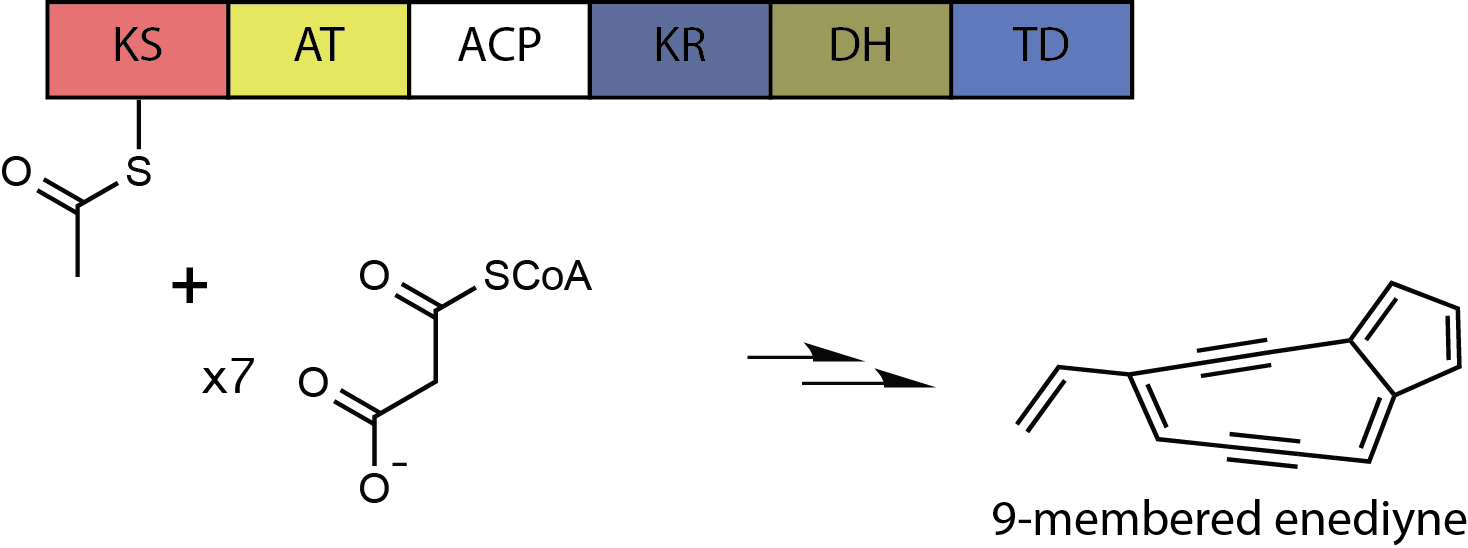
Iterative PKS

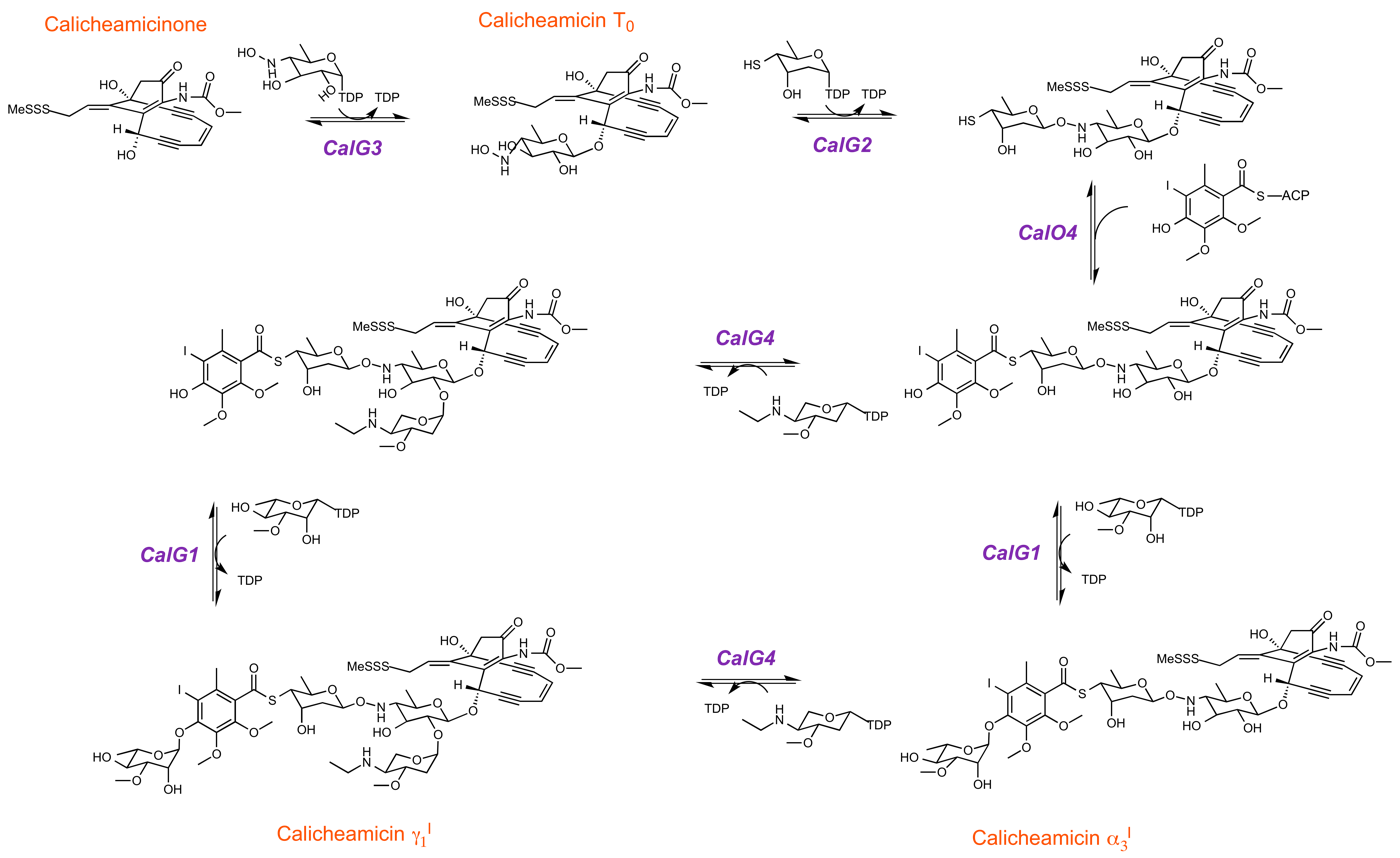
Schematic of calicheamicin glycosylation pathway

The core metabolic pathway for biosynthesis of this molecule resembles that of other characterized enediyne compounds and occurs via an iterative polyketide synthase (PKS) pathway. This type I PKS loads Acetyl-CoA and then repeatedly adds a total of seven Malonyl-CoAs. The growing polyketide is acted upon by the ketoreductase domain (KR) and dehydratase domain (DH) during each iteration to produce a 15-carbon polyene, which is then processed by accessory enzymes to yield the putative enediyne core of calicheamicin. Maturation of the polyketide core is anticipated to occur by the action of additional enzymes to provide a calicheamicinone-like intermediate as a substrate for subsequent glycosylation.

Glycosylation of calicheamicinone requires 4 glycosyltransferases (CalG1-4) and one acyltransferase (CalO4), each recognizing a specific sugar nucleotide or orsellinic acid substrate. Ground-breaking biochemical studies of CalG1-G4 by Thorson and coworkers revealed the reactions catalyzed by these glycosyltransferases to be highly reversible. This was a paradigm shift in the context of glycosyltransferase catalysis and Thorson and coworkers went on to demonstrate this to be a general phenomenon that could be exploited for sugar nucleotide synthesis and 'glycorandomization'. The structures of all four glycosyltransferases were also reported by the same group, revealing a conserved calicheamicin binding motif that coordinates the enediyne backbone thorough interactions with aromatic residues. The catalytic site of CalG1, CalG3, and CalG4 was shown to possess a highly conserved catalytic dyad of histidine and aspartate which promotes nucleophilic attack on the acceptor hydroxyl group of calicheamicin intermediates. Notably, this motif is absent from CalG2, suggesting a different catalytic mechanism in this enzyme.

== Resistance ==
Calicheamicin displays unbiased toxicity to bacteria, fungi, viruses, and eukaryotic cells and organisms, which raises questions as to how the calicheamicin-producing Micromonospora manages not to poison itself. An answer to this question was presented in 2003 when Thorson and coworkers presented the first known example of a "self-sacrifice" resistance mechanism encoded by the gene calC from the calicheamicin biosynthetic gene cluster. In this study, the scientists revealed calicheamicin to cleave the protein CalC site-specifically, destroying both the calicheamicin and the CalC protein, thereby preventing DNA damage. The same group went on to solve the structure of CalC and, more recently, in collaboration with scientists from the Center for Pharmaceutical Research and Innovation (CPRI), discover structural or functional homologs encoded by genes in the calicheamicin gene cluster previously listed as encoding unknown function. In this latter study, the authors suggest that CalC homologs may serve in a biosynthetic capacity as the long-sought-after polyketide cyclases required to fold or cyclize early intermediates en route to calicheamicin.

== History ==
It has been proposed that Alexander the Great was poisoned by drinking the water of the river Mavroneri (identified with the mythological River Styx) which is postulated to have been contaminated by this compound. However, toxicologists believe an extensive knowledge of biological chemistry would have been requisite for any application of this poison in antiquity.

== See also ==
- Antibody-drug conjugates using calicheamicins as cytotoxic agents:
  - Gemtuzumab ozogamicin
  - Inotuzumab ozogamicin
