= Chromoprotein =

A chromoprotein is a conjugated protein that contains a pigmented prosthetic group (or cofactor). A common example is haemoglobin, which contains a heme cofactor, which is the iron-containing molecule that makes oxygenated blood appear red. Other examples of chromoproteins include other hemochromes, cytochromes, phytochromes and flavoproteins.

In hemoglobin there exists a chromoprotein (tetramer MW:4 x 16.125 =64.500), namely heme, consisting of Fe++ four pyrrol rings.

A single chromoprotein can act as both a phytochrome and a phototropin due to the presence and processing of multiple chromophores. Phytochrome in ferns contains PHY3 which contains an unusual photoreceptor with a dual-channel possessing both phytochrome (red-light sensing) and phototropin (blue-light sensing) and this helps the growth of fern plants at low sunlight.

The GFP protein family includes both fluorescent proteins and non-fluorescent chromoproteins. Through mutagenesis or irradiation, the non-fluorescent chromoproteins can be converted to fluorescent chromoproteins. An example of such converted chromoprotein is "kindling fluorescent proteins" or KFP1 which was converted from a mutated non-fluorescent Anemonia sulcata chromoprotein to a fluorescent chromoprotein.

Sea anemones contain purple chromoprotein shCP with its GFP-like chromophore in the trans-conformation. The chromophore is derived from Glu-63, Tyr-64 and Gly-65 and the phenolic group of Tyr-64 plays a vital role in the formation of a conjugated system with the imidazolidone moiety resulting a high absorbance in the absorption spectrum of chromoprotein in the excited state. The replacement of Tyrosine with other amino acids leads to the alteration of optical and non-planar properties of the chromoprotein. Fluorescent proteins such as anthrozoa chromoproteins emit long wavelengths

14 chromoproteins were engineered to be expressed in E. coli for synthetic biology. However, chromoproteins bring high toxicities to their E. coli hosts, resulting in the loss of colors. mRFP1, the monomeric red fluorescent protein, which also displays distinguishable color under ambient light, was found to be less toxic. Color-changing mutagenesis on amino acids 64–65 of the mRFP1 fluorophore was done to acquire different colors.

Chromoproteins are valuable in synthetic biology, genetic engineering, and biotechnology as visible markers for tracking gene expression, assaying cellular functions and creating colorful biosensors.

== Structure ==
Chromoproteins consistently express an electron absorption band near-IR, near-UV, or visible spectral ranges. These bands result from charge-transfer transitions of metal ions or π → π* prosthetic group transitions. This is why they function as photoreceptors in plants, enzymes, or electron transfer proteins. Photosynthetic pigments and photoreceptors contain chromophores covalently attached to linear or cyclic tetrapyrroles and rhodopsins contain chromophores covalently attached to an apoprotein. The chromophores attach because they act as Schiff bases. They mostly consist of an eleven sheeted beta-barrel structure and a chromophore in an alpha-helix, generally formed by interaction of three amino acids leading to imidazolidine moiety. Many chromoproteins have intracellular longevity and thermal stability as a result of their tetrameric structure.

== Examples ==
Rhodopsin is a chromoprotein found in bacteria and vertebrates and consists of opsin and 11-cis-retinal. For many species including humans, it is essential for adequate vision as it allows sight in low light settings. When exposed to light, the 11-cis-retinal is transformed into all-trans-retinal, which changes the molecule's configuration and initiates a process to change light to information carried by the optic nerve and the all-trans-retinal is either transformed back into 11-cis-retinal or stored for recycling.

Hemochrome is a heme group of hemoglobin and the reason that oxygenated blood is red.

Cytochromes are responsible for electron transport in aerobic animals, plants, and microbes as well as redox reactions. They are found primarily in the mitochondria and have numerous classifications (a-type, b-type, c-type, and d-type) based on heme prosthetic groups. Cytochrome c-type is used in apoptosis (programmed cell death) and is found in all eukaryotes. It is also present in prokaryotes where they are believed to be used for respiration and photosynthesis.

Phytochromes light-sensing photoreceptors found in plants and microbes. Their purpose is to measure light signals and appropriate a response considering presence, color, intensity, photoperiodicity considering an organism's needs and developmental stage. In edition to having direct effect on growth, reproduction, and architecture of plants, phytochromes contribute to a process called shade-avoidance. Shade avoidance is a process activated when light intensity decreases and the light spectrum changes, often due to neighboring plants. When phytochromes detect these changes, the directional growth of the plant is altered to grow away from the direction of this change in order to expose the plant to more light.

Flavoproteins are ligands that contain one or more flavin nucleotides as redox cofactors or co-substrates. They are involved in repairing damaged DNA, photosynthesis, and prevent oxidative stress through radical removal. They have been extensively researched and 90% of them perform redox reactions.

== Chromoproteins in marine life ==
The Cassiopea xamachana jellyfish species, many corals, and sea anemone express chromoproteins. Cassiopea xamachana are observed to have blue chromoproteins while corals are found to have pink, purple, and blue chromoproteins. It is speculated that the function of chromoproteins in coral is to protect them from solar radiation by reflecting both visible and infrared light when photosynthetic activity of a wavelength is low, dissipating excess energy but still allowing more active wavelengths to reach the coral's zooxanthellae. Additionally, chromoproteins allow corals to resist loss of symbiotic zooxanthellae when exposed to heat stress (coral bleaching). In sea anemones, it is speculated that chromoproteins allow for mimicry of red worms to attract fish as well as camouflage from predators.

== Applications ==
=== Rainbow screening ===
A method of genetic cloning that combines chromoproteins and a Gibson Assembly to mark and easily distinguish Eschericia coli colonies. This makes the process more effective as extra genetic manipulations are not needed and the chromoproteins reveal false colonies. This method lowers costs and increases efficiency and accuracy by upwards of 80%.

=== Blue-Purple evaluation ===
Blue-Purple (BP) evaluation is a chromoprotein-based method for assessing the compatibility of synthetic biological parts (BioBricks). The method uses blue (amilCP) and purple (tsPurple) chromoproteins as visual markers to evaluate BioBrick compatibility in Escherichia coli. By comparing the proportions of blue and purple colonies on agar plates, the method enables the identification of BioBrick combinations that are compatible with their bacterial hosts. The approach has been demonstrated using genetic circuits involving the toxin-antitoxin pair (CcdA-CcdB), bacteriophage lysis protein E, and superfolder green fluorescent protein (sfGFP).

=== Biosensor development ===
Chromoproteins can be used for biosensor development. Biosensors are used for many purposes including medical diagnosis, tracking disease progression, forensics, drug discovery, environmental monitoring, and food safety. They do this by generating a signal that is proportional to analyte concentration (the substance being measured) of a reaction.

== Limitations ==
However, professionals more often use other fluorescent proteins as chromoproteins do not have adequate structure characterization, an important aspect of protein engineering. Chromoproteins used in coloration of E. Coli samples must be overexpressed to work, resulting in fitness costs with the most effective dark chromoproteins. Plasmids encoding these chromoproteins resulted in loss of color due to mutations in liquid cultures. It was found that monomeric red fluorescent protein 1 (mRFP1) is a fitting replacement as it effectively darkly marks E. Coli, but with minimal fitness cost. Chromoprotein genes in E. Coli also result in cytotoxicity, suggesting harmful protein aggregation as found with oligomerization, expression level, and inclusion bodies data. Monomeric variants also have an advantage over chromoproteins in fusion-tagging experiments. The oligomerization of chromoproteins leads to protein aggregation when it is overexpressed in heterologous mammalian and bacteria cells.
