= Nocardiopsis sinuspersici =

Scientific classification
- Domain: Bacteria
- Kingdom: Bacillati
- Phylum: Actinomycetota
- Class: Actinomycetia
- Order: Streptosporangiales
- Family: Nocardiopsaceae
- Genus: Nocardiopsis
- Species: N. sinuspersici

Binomial name
- Nocardiopsis sinuspersici Hamedi et al. 2010

Type strain
- CCUG 57624, DSM 45277, HM6, UTMC 00102

Species of bacterium

Nocardiopsis sinuspersici is a species of bacteria that is an aerobic, Gram positive, alkalohalophilic, actinomycete. While species from the genus Nocardiopsis have been found in a variety of environments, primarily soils, strain N. sinuspersici sp. nov was isolated from sandy rhizospheric soils from Sarbandar and Khoramshahr in Iran.

== Growth and morphology ==
Nocardiopsis sinuspersici have been shown to grow optimally on yeast extract agar and less optimally on agar containing oatmeal and inorganic starches. N. sinuspersici possess several unique phenotypic traits not seen in other members of Nocardiopsis. N. sinuspersici possess small amounts of light yellow mycelium and "zig-zag" hyphea. Over time these hyphae form red spores. The cellular membrane of N. sinuspersici is also unique, most notably lacking mycolic acids.

Strains of N. sinuspersici can grow in a wide range of conditions, but have been found to grow best at 28 °C, a pH of 7, and a salt concentration of 2.5%. Despite showing high similarity genetic similarity to Nocardiopsis quinghaiensis, Nocardiopsis aegyptia, and Nocardiopsis halotolerans, N. sinuspersici shows a distinguishable growth rate among other species when grown at a pH of 12, a salt concentration of 15%, and a temperature of 10 C. N. sinuspersici is also distinguishable from the other members of Nocardiopsis among major chemical compounds, including the production of different sugars, phospholipid patterns, menaquinones, and fatty acids. The bacterium also produces a serine protease capable of rapidly breaking down milk protein. N. sinuspersici sp. nov has been observed to utilize carbon sources including d-Galactose, lactose, melibiose, glycerol, sucrose, maltose, mannitol, d-mannose, l-rhamnose, d-xylose, inulin, citrate, malonate, pyruvate, and propionate.

== Genetics ==
The entire genome of N. sinuspersici has been sequenced. The 16S RNA gene of N. sinuspersici shows high similarity to other members of the genus, including Nocardiopsis quinghaiensis, Nocardiopsis aegyptia, and Nocardiopsis halotolerans, with sequence identities of 99.2%, 98.5%, and 98.2% respectively. From a review of its genome, N. sinuspersici possesses a high number of genes associated with the production of secondary metabolites. Specifically, N. sinuspersici was shown to possess 63 gene clusters associated with the production of secondary metabolites. Shotgun sequences of N. sinuspersici can be found under the accession number MCOK0000000 at GenBank.
