= Streptomonospora alba =

Scientific classification
- Domain: Bacteria
- Kingdom: Bacillati
- Phylum: Actinomycetota
- Class: Actinomycetes
- Order: Streptosporangiales
- Family: Nocardiopsaceae
- Genus: Streptomonospora
- Species: S. alba

Binomial name
- Streptomonospora alba Li et al. 2003

Species of bacterium

Streptomonospora alba is a halophilic species of bacteria. YIM 90003(T) (=CCTCC AA001013(T)=DSM 44588(T)) is the type strain. It is closest to Streptomonospora salina. Its genome sequence was reported in 2015.

== Description ==
Its aerial mycelium and substrate mycelium are well developed on most media. The aerial mycelium form short spore chains, bearing non-motile, straight to flexuous spores with wrinkled surfaces.

== Metabolites ==
Streptomonospora alba was found to produce streptomonomicin, a lasso peptide antibiotic. Streptomonomicin displayed selective antibacterial activity against bacteria of the Bacillota phylum, especially Bacillus anthracis, while being inactive against Pseudomonadota or Ascomycota.
