= Nocardiopsis potens =

Scientific classification
- Domain: Bacteria
- Kingdom: Bacillati
- Phylum: Actinomycetota
- Class: Actinomycetes
- Order: Streptosporangiales
- Family: Nocardiopsaceae
- Genus: Nocardiopsis
- Species: N. potens

Binomial name
- Nocardiopsis potens Yassin et al. 2009

Type strain
- CCUG 56587, DSM 45234, IMMIB L-21

Species of bacterium

Nocardiopsis potens is a bacterium from the genus Nocardiopsis which has been isolated from household waste in Stuttgart in Germany.
