= Nocardiopsis flavescens =

Scientific classification
- Domain: Bacteria
- Kingdom: Bacillati
- Phylum: Actinomycetota
- Class: Actinomycetia
- Order: Streptosporangiales
- Family: Nocardiopsaceae
- Genus: Nocardiopsis
- Species: N. flavescens

Binomial name
- Nocardiopsis flavescens Fang et al. 2011

Type strain
- CGMCC 4.5723, JCM 17424, SA6

Species of bacterium

Nocardiopsis flavescens is a Gram-positive and aerobic bacterium from the genus Nocardiopsis which has been isolated from the seashore of Lianyungang in China.
