= Streptomonospora flavalba =

Scientific classification
- Domain: Bacteria
- Kingdom: Bacillati
- Phylum: Actinomycetota
- Class: Actinomycetes
- Order: Streptosporangiales
- Family: Nocardiopsaceae
- Genus: Streptomonospora
- Species: S. flavalba

Binomial name
- Streptomonospora flavalba Cai et al. 2009

Species of bacterium

Streptomonospora flavalba is a bacterium. Its type strain is YIM 91394^{T}(=DSM 45155^{T}=CCTCC AA 208047^{T}).

== Description ==
It is halophilic, aerobic, catalase-positive, oxidase-negative and Gram-positive.
