= Actinocorallia =

Scientific classification
- Domain: Bacteria
- Kingdom: Bacillati
- Phylum: Actinomycetota
- Class: Actinomycetes
- Order: Streptosporangiales
- Family: Thermomonosporaceae
- Genus: Actinocorallia; Iinuma et al. 1994 em. Zhang et al. 2001

Type species
- Actinocorallia herbida Iinuma et al. 1994

Species
- A. aurantiaca; A. aurea; A. cavernae; A. glomerata; A. herbida; A. libanotica; A. lasiicapitis; A. longicatena; A. populi; "A. spatholoba"

Synonyms
- "Sarraceniospora" Furihata et al. 1989

Genus of bacteria

Actinocorallia is a genus in the phylum Actinomycetota (Bacteria).

== Etymology ==
The name Actinocorallia derives from:
Greek noun 'aktis, aktinos (ἀκτίς, ἀκτῖνος), a beam; Latin noun corallium, coral; Neo-Latin feminine gender noun Actinocorallia, meaning an actinomycete microorganism that forms sporophores resembling coral.

The genus contains 10 species (including basonyms and synonyms), namely

- A. aurantiaca (Lavrova and Preobrazhenskaya 1975) Zhang et al. 2001; Neo-Latin feminine gender adjective aurantiaca, orange-coloured, referring to the gold-colored substrate mycelium, was formerly known as Actinomadura aurantiaca
- A. aurea Tamura et al. 2007; Latin feminine gender adjective aurea, golden, formerly known as "Sarraceniospora aurea"
- A. cavernae Lee 2006; Latin genitive case noun cavernae, of a cavern, was isolated from a cave in Jeju, Korea
- A. glomerata (Itoh et al. 1996) Zhang et al. 2001; Latin feminine gender participle adjective glomerata, (from Latin v. glomerare, to form into ball, glomerate), formerly known as Actinomadura glomerata
- A. herbida Iinuma et al. 1994 (Type species of the genus); Latin feminine gender adjective herbida, like grass, grassy, referring to the formation of aerial mycelia like grass.
- A. libanotica (Meyer 1981) Zhang et al. 2001; Latin noun Libanus, Lebanon; Latin feminine gender suff. -tica, suff. denoting made of or belonging to; Neo-Latin feminine gender adjective libanotica, belonging to Lebanon (the country in which the soil sample was taken), was formerly known as Actinomadura libanotica
- A. longicatena (Itoh et al. 1996) Zhang et al. 2001; Latin adjective longus, long; Latin feminine gender noun catena, chain; Neo-Latin feminine gender noun longicatena, a long chain.
- "A. spatholoba" Chen et al. 2007a

== Phylogeny ==
The currently accepted taxonomy is based on the List of Prokaryotic names with Standing in Nomenclature (LPSN) and National Center for Biotechnology Information (NCBI).

16S rRNA based LTP_10_2024

- Actinocorallia
  - A. lasiicapitis Liu et al. 2016
  - - - A. glomerata (Itoh et al. 1996) Zhang et al. 2001
      - A. longicatena (Itoh et al. 1996) Zhang et al. 2001
    - - A. cavernae Lee 2006
      - - A. aurea Tamura, Hatano & Suzuki 2007
        - - A. herbida Iinuma et al. 1994
          - - A. aurantiaca (Lavrova & Preobrazhenskaya 1975) Zhang et al. 2001
            - - A. libanotica (Meyer 1981) Zhang et al. 2001
              - A. populi Li et al. 2018

120 marker proteins based GTDB 10-RS226

- Actinocorallia
  - A. longicatena
  - - A. herbida
    - - A. aurantiaca
      - - A. libanotica
        - A. populi

== See also ==
- List of bacterial orders
- List of bacteria genera
