= Nocardiopsis nikkonensis =

Scientific classification
- Domain: Bacteria
- Kingdom: Bacillati
- Phylum: Actinomycetota
- Class: Actinomycetia
- Order: Streptosporangiales
- Family: Nocardiopsaceae
- Genus: Nocardiopsis
- Species: N. nikkonensis

Binomial name
- Nocardiopsis nikkonensis Yamamura et al. 2010

Type strain
- KCTC 19666, NBRC 102170, YU1183-22

Synonyms
- Nocardiopsis nikkoensis

Species of bacterium

Nocardiopsis nikkonensis is a bacterium from the genus Nocardiopsis which has been isolated from compost soil in Nikko in Japan.
