= Nocardiopsis chromatogenes =

Scientific classification
- Domain: Bacteria
- Kingdom: Bacillati
- Phylum: Actinomycetota
- Class: Actinomycetes
- Order: Streptosporangiales
- Family: Nocardiopsaceae
- Genus: Nocardiopsis
- Species: N. chromatogenes

Binomial name
- Nocardiopsis chromatogenes Li et al. 2006

Type strain
- CCTCC AA 2040015, CIP 109297, DSM 44844, JCM 15311, KCTC 19008, YIM 90109

Synonyms
- Nocardiopsis chromogenes

Species of bacterium

Nocardiopsis chromatogenes is a bacterium from the genus Nocardiopsis which has been isolated from hypersaline soil from China.
