= Nocardiopsis algeriensis =

Scientific classification
- Domain: Bacteria
- Kingdom: Bacillati
- Phylum: Actinomycetota
- Class: Actinomycetia
- Order: Streptosporangiales
- Family: Nocardiopsaceae
- Genus: Nocardiopsis
- Species: N. algeriensis

Binomial name
- Nocardiopsis algeriensis Bouras et al. 2015

Type strain
- CECT 8712, DSM 45462, B32

Species of bacterium

Nocardiopsis algeriensis is an alkalitolerant bacterium from the genus Nocardiopsis which has been isolate from saharan soil from the Adrar Province in Algeria.
