= Nocardiopsis litoralis =

Scientific classification
- Domain: Bacteria
- Kingdom: Bacillati
- Phylum: Actinomycetota
- Class: Actinomycetia
- Order: Streptosporangiales
- Family: Nocardiopsaceae
- Genus: Nocardiopsis
- Species: N. litoralis

Binomial name
- Nocardiopsis litoralis Chen et al. 2009

Type strain
- DSM 45168, JCM 16954, JSM 073097, KCTC 19473

Species of bacterium

Nocardiopsis litoralis is a Gram-positive, moderately halophilic, alkalitolerant and aerobic bacterium from the genus Nocardiopsis which has been isolated from a sea anemone from the South China Sea near the Naozhou Island in China.
