= Nocardiopsis composta =

Scientific classification
- Domain: Bacteria
- Kingdom: Bacillati
- Phylum: Actinomycetota
- Class: Actinomycetes
- Order: Streptosporangiales
- Family: Nocardiopsaceae
- Genus: Nocardiopsis
- Species: N. composta

Binomial name
- Nocardiopsis composta Kämpfer et al. 2002

Type strain
- BCRC 16374, CCRC 16374, CGMCC 4.2090, CIP 107461, DSM 44551, JCM 11768, KS9, NBRC 100345, NRRL B-24145, VKM Ac-2521, VTT E-042201

Synonyms
- Nocardiopsis compostus

Species of bacterium

Nocardiopsis composta is a bacterium from the genus Nocardiopsis which has been isolated from a composting facility in Germany.
