= Nocardiopsis tropica =

Scientific classification
- Domain: Bacteria
- Kingdom: Bacillati
- Phylum: Actinomycetota
- Class: Actinomycetes
- Order: Streptosporangiales
- Family: Nocardiopsaceae
- Genus: Nocardiopsis
- Species: N. tropica

Binomial name
- Nocardiopsis tropica Evtushenko et al. 2000

Type strain
- CGMCC 4.2092, CIP 106426, DSM 44381, JCM 10877, VKM Ac-1457

Species of bacterium

Nocardiopsis tropica is a bacterium from the genus Nocardiopsis.
