= Nocardiopsis alkaliphila =

Scientific classification
- Domain: Bacteria
- Kingdom: Bacillati
- Phylum: Actinomycetota
- Class: Actinomycetes
- Order: Streptosporangiales
- Family: Nocardiopsaceae
- Genus: Nocardiopsis
- Species: N. alkaliphila

Binomial name
- Nocardiopsis alkaliphila Hozzein et al. 2004

Type strain
- CCTCC AA001031, DSM 44657, JCM 12678, NBRC 104163, WS2, YIM 80379

Synonyms
- Nocardiopsis egyptensis

Species of bacterium

Nocardiopsis alkaliphila is an alkaliphilic bacterium from the genus Nocardiopsis which has been isolated from soil from Egypt. Nocardiopsis alkaliphila produces nocardiopyrone A, nocardiopyrone B and pyridinols.
