= Nocardiopsis yanglingensis =

Scientific classification
- Domain: Bacteria
- Kingdom: Bacillati
- Phylum: Actinomycetota
- Class: Actinomycetes
- Order: Streptosporangiales
- Family: Nocardiopsaceae
- Genus: Nocardiopsis
- Species: N. yanglingensis

Binomial name
- Nocardiopsis yanglingensis Yan et al. 2011

Type strain
- CCTCC 209063, KCTC 19723, A18

Species of bacterium

Nocardiopsis yanglingensis is a thermophilic bacterium from the genus Nocardiopsis which has been isolated from compost of Agaricus bisporus mushrooms.
