= Nocardiopsis terrae =

Scientific classification
- Domain: Bacteria
- Kingdom: Bacillati
- Phylum: Actinomycetota
- Class: Actinomycetia
- Order: Streptosporangiales
- Family: Nocardiopsaceae
- Genus: Nocardiopsis
- Species: N. terrae

Binomial name
- Nocardiopsis terrae Chen et al. 2012

Type strain
- CCTCC AA 208011, DSM 45157, KCTC 19431, YIM 90022

Species of bacterium

Nocardiopsis terrae is a Gram-positive, halophilic, facultatively alkaliphilic and obligately aerobic bacterium from the genus of Nocardiopsis which has been isolated from saline soil from the Qaidam Basin in the Qinghai Province in China.
