= Nocardiopsis oceani =

Scientific classification
- Domain: Bacteria
- Kingdom: Bacillati
- Phylum: Actinomycetota
- Class: Actinomycetia
- Order: Streptosporangiales
- Family: Nocardiopsaceae
- Genus: Nocardiopsis
- Species: N. oceani

Binomial name
- Nocardiopsis oceani Pan et al. 2015

Species of bacterium

Nocardiopsis oceani is a Gram-positive and aerobic bacterium from the genus Nocardiopsis which has been isolated from the South China Sea.
