= Nocardiopsis ganjiahuensis =

Scientific classification
- Domain: Bacteria
- Kingdom: Bacillati
- Phylum: Actinomycetota
- Class: Actinomycetes
- Order: Streptosporangiales
- Family: Nocardiopsaceae
- Genus: Nocardiopsis
- Species: N. ganjiahuensis

Binomial name
- Nocardiopsis ganjiahuensis Zhang et al. 2008

Type strain
- CGMCC 4.3500, DSM 45031, HBUM 20038, JCM 15475

Species of bacterium

Nocardiopsis ganjiahuensis is a bacterium from the genus Nocardiopsis which has been isolated from soil from the Ganjiahu Natural Reserve from the Xinjiang Province in China.
