= Nocardiopsis umidischolae =

Scientific classification
- Domain: Bacteria
- Kingdom: Bacillati
- Phylum: Actinomycetota
- Class: Actinomycetia
- Order: Streptosporangiales
- Family: Nocardiopsaceae
- Genus: Nocardiopsis
- Species: N. umidischolae

Binomial name
- Nocardiopsis umidischolae Peltola et al. 2002

Species of bacterium

Nocardiopsis umidischolae is a species of bacteria. It produces methanol-soluble toxins that paralyse the motility of boar spermatozoa. Its type strain is 66/93^{T}.
