= Nocardiopsis rosea =

Scientific classification
- Domain: Bacteria
- Kingdom: Bacillati
- Phylum: Actinomycetota
- Class: Actinomycetia
- Order: Streptosporangiales
- Family: Nocardiopsaceae
- Genus: Nocardiopsis
- Species: N. rosea

Binomial name
- Nocardiopsis rosea Li et al. 2006

Type strain
- CCTCC AA 2040013, CIP 109296, DSM 44842, JCM 15314, KCTC 19007, YIM 90094

Species of bacterium

Nocardiopsis rosea is a bacterium from the genus Nocardiopsis which has been isolated from hypersaline soil in China.
