= Nocardiopsis baichengensis =

Scientific classification
- Domain: Bacteria
- Kingdom: Bacillati
- Phylum: Actinomycetota
- Class: Actinomycetes
- Order: Streptosporangiales
- Family: Nocardiopsaceae
- Genus: Nocardiopsis
- Species: N. baichengensis

Binomial name
- Nocardiopsis baichengensis Li et al. 2006

Type strain
- CCTCC AA 2040016, CIP 109298, DSM 44845, JCM 15310, KCTC 19009, YIM 90130

Species of bacterium

Nocardiopsis baichengensis is a bacterium from the genus Nocardiopsis which has been isolated from hypersaline soil in China.
