= Nocardiopsis fildesensis =

Scientific classification
- Domain: Bacteria
- Kingdom: Bacillati
- Phylum: Actinomycetota
- Class: Actinomycetes
- Order: Streptosporangiales
- Family: Nocardiopsaceae
- Genus: Nocardiopsis
- Species: N. fildesensis

Binomial name
- Nocardiopsis fildesensis Xu et al. 2014

Type strain
- CGMCC 4.7023, DSM 45699, GW9-2, NRRL B-24873

Species of bacterium

Nocardiopsis fildesensis is a bacterium from the genus of Nocardiopsis which has been isolated from soil from the Chinese Antarctic Great Wall Station on the King George Island.
