= Nocardiopsis valliformis =

Scientific classification
- Domain: Bacteria
- Kingdom: Bacillati
- Phylum: Actinomycetota
- Class: Actinomycetes
- Order: Streptosporangiales
- Family: Nocardiopsaceae
- Genus: Nocardiopsis
- Species: N. valliformis

Binomial name
- Nocardiopsis valliformis Yang et al. 2008

Type strain
- CGMCC 4.2135, DSM 45023, HBUM 20028, JCM 16800

Species of bacterium

Nocardiopsis valliformis is an alkaliphilic bacterium from the genus Nocardiopsis which has been isolated from soil from an alkali lake in China.
