= Nocardiopsis rhodophaea =

Scientific classification
- Domain: Bacteria
- Kingdom: Bacillati
- Phylum: Actinomycetota
- Class: Actinomycetes
- Order: Streptosporangiales
- Family: Nocardiopsaceae
- Genus: Nocardiopsis
- Species: N. rhodophaea

Binomial name
- Nocardiopsis rhodophaea Li et al. 2006

Type strain
- CCTCC AA 2040014, CIP 109295, DSM 44843, JCM 15313, KCTC 19049, YIM 90096

Synonyms
- Nocardiopsis rhodophaeos

Species of bacterium

Nocardiopsis rhodophaea is a bacterium from the genus Nocardiopsis which has been isolated from hypersaline soil in China.
