= 2-Amino-4-deoxychorismate dehydrogenase =

Class of enzymes

2-amino-4-deoxychorismate dehydrogenase

Identifiers
- EC no.: 1.3.8.16

Databases
- IntEnz: IntEnz view
- BRENDA: BRENDA entry
- ExPASy: NiceZyme view
- KEGG: KEGG entry
- MetaCyc: metabolic pathway
- PRIAM: profile
- PDB structures: RCSB PDB PDBe PDBsum
Search
- PMC: articles
- PubMed: articles
- NCBI: proteins

2-Amino-4-deoxychorismate dehydrogenase (EC 1.3.8.16, ADIC dehydrogenase, 2-amino-2-deoxyisochorismate dehydrogenase, SgcG) is an enzyme with systematic name (2S)-2-amino-4-deoxychorismate:FMN oxidoreductase. This enzyme catalyses the following chemical reaction

(1)
+ FMN
(2)
+ FMNH2

It converts 2-amino-2-deoxyisochorismic acid (1) into 3-(1-carboxyvinyloxy)anthranilic acid (2) by oxidation using flavin mononucleotide (FMN) as its cofactor.

Antibiotic C-1027

This reaction is part of the biosynthesis of the benzoxazolinate moiety of the enediyne antitumour antibiotic C-1027 from Streptomyces globisporus. The intermediate acid (1) is produced from chorismic acid by the enzyme 2-amino-4-deoxychorismate synthase:

chorismic acid
+ glutamine
(1)
+ glutamic acid
