= Nocardiopsis metallicus =

Scientific classification
- Domain: Bacteria
- Kingdom: Bacillati
- Phylum: Actinomycetota
- Class: Actinomycetes
- Order: Streptosporangiales
- Family: Nocardiopsaceae
- Genus: Nocardiopsis
- Species: N. metallicus

Binomial name
- Nocardiopsis metallicus Schippers et al. 2002

Type strain
- 114, BCRC 16377, CCRC 16377, CGMCC 4.2089, CIP 107788, DSM 44598, JCM 12409, KBS6, NBRC 101841, NRRL B-24159, VKM Ac-2522

Species of bacterium

Nocardiopsis metallicus is an alkaliphilic and metal-mobilizing bacterium from the genus Nocardiopsis which has been isolated from an alkaline slag dump in Germany.
