= Nocardiopsis coralliicola =

Scientific classification
- Domain: Bacteria
- Kingdom: Bacillati
- Phylum: Actinomycetota
- Class: Actinomycetes
- Order: Streptosporangiales
- Family: Nocardiopsaceae
- Genus: Nocardiopsis
- Species: N. coralliicola

Binomial name
- Nocardiopsis coralliicola Li et al. 2012

Type strain
- CCTCC AA 2011010, DSM 45611, SCSIO 10427

Synonyms
- Nocardiopsis corallicola

Species of bacterium

Nocardiopsis coralliicola is a bacterium from the genus Nocardiopsis which has been isolated from the coral Menella praelonga from the Weizhou Island in China.
