= Nocardiopsis kunsanensis =

Scientific classification
- Domain: Bacteria
- Kingdom: Bacillati
- Phylum: Actinomycetota
- Class: Actinomycetia
- Order: Streptosporangiales
- Family: Nocardiopsaceae
- Genus: Nocardiopsis
- Species: N. kunsanensis

Binomial name
- Nocardiopsis kunsanensis Chun et al. 2000

Species of bacterium

Nocardiopsis kunsanensis is a species of moderately halophilic actinomycete bacteria. Its type strain is HA-9^{T} (= KCTC 9831^{T}).
