= Nocardiopsis halophila =

Scientific classification
- Domain: Bacteria
- Kingdom: Bacillati
- Phylum: Actinomycetota
- Class: Actinomycetia
- Order: Streptosporangiales
- Family: Nocardiopsaceae
- Genus: Nocardiopsis
- Species: N. halophila

Binomial name
- Nocardiopsis halophila Al-Tai and Ruan 1994

Type strain
- A.S.4.1195, AS 4.1195, BCRC 16264, CCIM A.S.4.1195, CCRC 16264, CGMCC 4.1195, DSM 44494, IQ-H3, JCM 9892, KCTC 9825

Species of bacterium

Nocardiopsis halophila is a halophilic bacterium from the genus Nocardiopsis which has been isolated from saline soil in Iraq.
