= Nocardiopsis arvandica =

Scientific classification
- Domain: Bacteria
- Kingdom: Bacillati
- Phylum: Actinomycetota
- Class: Actinomycetes
- Order: Streptosporangiales
- Family: Nocardiopsaceae
- Genus: Nocardiopsis
- Species: N. arvandica

Binomial name
- Nocardiopsis arvandica Hamedi et al. 2011

Type strain
- CCUG 58831, DSM 45278, HM7, UTMC 00103

Species of bacterium

Nocardiopsis arvandica is a bacterium from the genus Nocardiopsis which has been isolated from sandy soil from the Arvand River in Khoramshahr in Iran.
