= Nocardiopsis listeri =

Scientific classification
- Domain: Bacteria
- Kingdom: Bacillati
- Phylum: Actinomycetota
- Class: Actinomycetia
- Order: Streptosporangiales
- Family: Nocardiopsaceae
- Genus: Nocardiopsis
- Species: N. listeri

Binomial name
- Nocardiopsis listeri Grund and Kroppenstedt 1990

Type strain
- AS 4.1445, ATCC 27442, BCRC 15134, CBS 661.72, CCRC 15134, CGMCC 4.1445, CGMCC 4.2110, CGMCC AS 4.1445, DSM 40297, IFO 13360, ISP 5297, JCM 4782, KCC S-0782, Lanoot R-8779, LMG 19405, NBRC 13360, NCTC 434, NRRL B-2782, PCM 2491, R-8779, RIA 1321, VKM Ac-1881

Synonyms
- Streptomyces listeri

Species of bacterium

Nocardiopsis listeri is a bacterium from the genus Nocardiopsis which has been isolated from human clinical isolates.
