= Nocardiopsis alba =

Scientific classification
- Domain: Bacteria
- Kingdom: Bacillati
- Phylum: Actinomycetota
- Class: Actinomycetes
- Order: Streptosporangiales
- Family: Nocardiopsaceae
- Genus: Nocardiopsis
- Species: N. alba

Binomial name
- Nocardiopsis alba Kroppenstedt 1990

Type strain
- A92, BCRC 16256, Caysey W2536, CCRC 16256, CDC W2536, DSM 43377, IFM 10232, IFO 15097, IMSNU 22172, JCM 9419, KCTC 9616, NBRC 15097, VKM Ac-1883, VTT E-991433

Synonyms
- Nocardiopsis albus: Nocardiopsis albus subsp. albus; Nocardiopsis alba subsp. alba

Species of bacterium

Nocardiopsis alba is a bacterium from the genus Nocardiopsis which has been isolated from a patient.
