= Nocardiopsis salina =

Scientific classification
- Domain: Bacteria
- Kingdom: Bacillati
- Phylum: Actinomycetota
- Class: Actinomycetes
- Order: Streptosporangiales
- Family: Nocardiopsaceae
- Genus: Nocardiopsis
- Species: N. salina

Binomial name
- Nocardiopsis salina Li et al. 2004

Type strain
- CCTCC AA 204009, CIP 108478, JCM 13364, KCTC 19003, YIM 90010

Species of bacterium

Nocardiopsis salina is a halophilic bacterium from the genus Nocardiopsis which has been isolated from hypersaline soil in the Xinjiang Province in China.
