= Nocardiopsis xinjiangensis =

Scientific classification
- Domain: Bacteria
- Kingdom: Bacillati
- Phylum: Actinomycetota
- Class: Actinomycetes
- Order: Streptosporangiales
- Family: Nocardiopsaceae
- Genus: Nocardiopsis
- Species: N. xinjiangensis

Binomial name
- Nocardiopsis xinjiangensis Li et al. 2003

Type strain
- BCRC 16285, CCRC 16285, CCTCC AA99004, CIP 107980, DSM 44589, JCM 12328, KCTC 9968, NRRL B-24158, YIM 90004

Species of bacterium

Nocardiopsis xinjiangensis is a halophilic bacterium from the genusNocardiopsis which has been isolated from saline soil in the Xinjiang Province in China.
