= Nocardiopsis gilva =

Scientific classification
- Domain: Bacteria
- Kingdom: Bacillati
- Phylum: Actinomycetota
- Class: Actinomycetes
- Order: Streptosporangiales
- Family: Nocardiopsaceae
- Genus: Nocardiopsis
- Species: N. gilva

Binomial name
- Nocardiopsis gilva Li et al. 2006

Type strain
- CCTCC AA 2040012, CIP 109294, DSM 44841, JCM 15312, KCTC 19006, YIM 90087

Synonyms
- Nocardiopsis flavoviridis

Species of bacterium

Nocardiopsis gilva is a halophilic bacterium from the genus Nocardiopsis which has been isolated from hypersaline soil in China. The Strain YIM 90087 of Nocardiopsis gilva produces some antifungal, antibacterial and antioxidant substances.
