= Actinomadura madurae =

Scientific classification
- Domain: Bacteria
- Kingdom: Bacillati
- Phylum: Actinomycetota
- Class: Actinomycetes
- Order: Streptosporangiales
- Family: Thermomonosporaceae
- Genus: Actinomadura
- Species: A. madurae

Binomial name
- Actinomadura madurae (Vincent 1894) Lechevalier and Lechevalier 1968

Synonyms
- Streptothrix madurae Vincent et al. 1894

Species of bacterium

Actinomadura madurae is a Gram positive, rod-shaped, obligately aerobic human pathogen that creates an aerial mycelium. A. madurae is a member of the aerobic actinomycetes, a group of Gram-positive bacilli that often form branching filaments resembling fungal mycelium.

It is a causative agent of mycetoma, a chronic, neglected, granulomatous disease that results from a traumatic implantation of microorganisms. It is estimated that A. madurae represents about 10% of all mycetoma cases.

The species name, madurae, originates from the name of a district in India, Madura.

== Microbiology ==
The microscopic and colonial morphology of organisms in the genus Actinomadura is very similar to those in the genus Streptomyces. Their powdery aerial hyphae may be blue, brown, cream, gray, green, pink, white, violet, or yellow. Colonies are wrinkled and may have a leathery or cartilaginous appearance when aerial mycelium is absent.

A. madurae grains from clinical specimens are constituted by thin filaments, approximately 1μm, and the grains are often visible to the naked eye. Grains typically measured between 0.5 and 5mm, are yellowish-white colored, have an irregular round shape and were soft in consistency. Microscopically, lobes with outer filament fringes are observed. Microscopic examination of grains with haematoxylin and eosin stain demonstrates them to be purple with pink peripheral pseudofilaments.

Cell walls contain the sugar madurose, a feature shared only with organisms in the genus Dermatophilus. Additionally, it is modified acid fast negative.

A. madurae can be grown in the range of 22–41 degrees Celsius and can be culivated on a wide variety of media, including Yeast malt agar and Columbia agar. The incubation period is around 10–40 days.

Histopathologic analysis typically shows chronic suppurative granuloma with variable hyperkeratosis, accompanied by intense inflammatory infiltrate, often creating microabscesses of polymorphonuclear cells.

== Clinical relevance ==
Most commonly, A. madurae causes a chronic, invasive, slowly progressive infection that usually occurs in the foot, sometimes referred to as Madura foot. Infection nearly always results from the traumatic implantation of the organism. The infection occurs most frequently in tropical regions, where people are more likely to walk barefoot.

Symptoms of A. madurae infection is usually nonspecific, with most cases presenting with increased volume and deformity of the infected region with few fistulae. A less common disease phenotype is "mini-mycetoma", a milder form of the disease often observed in adolescents and young adults. There have been reports of other manifestations of A. madurae infection, including a report of orbital actinomadura, as well as a report of central nervous system involvement in an A. madurae infection of a renal transplant patient.

No official therapeutic guideline is available for acinomycetoma, however, treatment with a combination of antibiotics is recommended, and monotherapy is discouraged. A regimen of trimethoprim/sulfamethoxazole and amikacin is considered the "gold standard" treatment, and isoniazid, rifampicin and ciprofloxacin have also been used with varying success.
