= Streptomonospora salina =

Scientific classification
- Domain: Bacteria
- Kingdom: Bacillati
- Phylum: Actinomycetota
- Class: Actinomycetes
- Order: Streptosporangiales
- Family: Nocardiopsaceae
- Genus: Streptomonospora
- Species: S. salina

Binomial name
- Streptomonospora salina Cui et al. 2001

Species of bacterium

Streptomonospora salina is a bacterium. YIM 90002T is its type strain.

== Description ==
The aerial mycelium of this species is well developed and at maturity forms short chains of spores. Spores in short chains are oval- to rod-shaped and have wrinkled surfaces. The substrate mycelium is branched with non-fragmenting hyphae and forms single oval to round spores borne on sporophores or dichotomously branching sporophores. Single spores and spores in short chains are non-motile.
