= Actinoallomurus =

Scientific classification
- Domain: Bacteria
- Kingdom: Bacillati
- Phylum: Actinomycetota
- Class: Actinomycetes
- Order: Streptosporangiales
- Family: Thermomonosporaceae
- Genus: Actinoallomurus; Tamura et al. 2009

Type species
- Actinoallomurus spadix (Nonomura & Ohara 1971) Tamura et al. 2009

Species
- See text

Genus of bacteria

Actinoallomurus is a genus in the phylum Actinomycetota (Bacteria).

== Etymology ==
The name Actinoallomurus derives from:
Greek noun actis actinos, ray, used to refer to actinomycetes; Greek adjective allos, different; Latin masculine gender noun murus, wall; Neo-Latin masculine gender noun Actinoallomurus, actinomycetes with a different wall.

== Phylogeny ==
The currently accepted taxonomy is based on the List of Prokaryotic names with Standing in Nomenclature (LPSN) and National Center for Biotechnology Information (NCBI).

16S rRNA based LTP_10_2024

- Actinoallomurus
  - - A. vinaceus Koyama et al. 2012
    - - A. acanthiterrae Tang et al. 2013
      - - - A. spadix (Nonomura & Ohara 1971) Tamura et al. 2009
          - - A. rhizosphaericola Chantavorakit et al. 2023
            - A. soli Chantavorakit et al. 2023
        - - A. purpureus Tamura et al. 2009
          - - A. liliacearum Koyama et al. 2012
            - A. luridus Tamura et al. 2009
  - - A. coprocola Tamura et al. 2009
    - - - A. iriomotensis Tamura et al. 2009
        - - A. oryzae Indananda et al. 2011
          - A. radicium Matsumoto et al. 2012
      - - A. bryophytorum Li et al. 2015
        - - A. yoronensis Tamura et al. 2009
          - - - A. acaciae Thamchaipenet et al. 2010
              - A. caesius Tamura et al. 2009
            - - A. amamiensis Tamura et al. 2009
              - A. fulvus Tamura et al. 2009

120 marker proteins based GTDB 10-RS226

- Actinoallomurus
  - - A. bryophytorum
    - - A. iriomotensis
      - A. oryzae
  - - A. purpureus
    - - A. vinaceus
      - - A. liliacearum
        - - A. soli
          - A. spadix

== See also ==
- List of bacterial orders
- List of bacteria genera
