= Nocardiopsis aegyptia =

Scientific classification
- Domain: Bacteria
- Kingdom: Bacillati
- Phylum: Actinomycetota
- Class: Actinomycetes
- Order: Streptosporangiales
- Family: Nocardiopsaceae
- Genus: Nocardiopsis
- Species: N. aegyptia

Binomial name
- Nocardiopsis aegyptia Sabry et al. 2004

Type strain
- 49, CGMCC 4.2109, CIP 108419, DSM 44442, JCM 13853, NBRC 104164, NRRL B-24244, NRRL B-24244 100055, SNG49

Synonyms
- Nocardiopsis aegyptica

Species of bacterium

Nocardiopsis aegyptia is a Gram-positive and aerobic bacterium from the genus Nocardiopsis which has been isolated from marine sediments from the Abu Qir Bay from Alexandria in Egypt. Nocardiopsis aegyptia can degrade poly(3-hydroxybutyrate) (PHB).
