= Nocardiopsis =

Scientific classification
- Domain: Bacteria
- Kingdom: Bacillati
- Phylum: Actinomycetota
- Class: Actinomycetes
- Order: Streptosporangiales
- Family: Nocardiopsaceae
- Genus: Nocardiopsis (Brocq-Rousseau 1904) Meyer 1976

Type species
- Nocardiopsis dassonvillei (Brocq-Rousseau 1904) Meyer 1976

Species
- See text

Synonyms
- "Brachystreptospora" Stach et al. 2003

Genus of bacteria

Nocardiopsis is a bacterial genus from the family Nocardiopsaceae which can produces some antimicrobial compounds, including thiopeptides. Nocardiopsis occur mostly in saline and alkaline soils.

== Phylogeny ==
The currently accepted taxonomy is based on the List of Prokaryotic names with Standing in Nomenclature (LPSN) and National Center for Biotechnology Information (NCBI).

16S rRNA based LTP_10_2024

- Nocardiopsis trehalosi Dolak, Castle & Laborde 1981 ex Evtushenko et al. 2000

- Nocardiopsis~
  - - Nocardiopsis mangrovi corrig. Huang et al. 2024
    - Nocardiopsis sediminis Muangham et al. 2016
  - - - Nocardiopsis coralliicola Li et al. 2012
      - - Nocardiopsis halophila Al-Tai & Ruan 1994
        - - Nocardiopsis chromatogenes Li et al. 2006
          - - Nocardiopsis endophytica Chantavorakit et al. 2023
            - Nocardiopsis suaedae Chantavorakit et al. 2023
    - - - Nocardiopsis composta corrig. Kämpfer, Busse & Rainey 2002
        - Nocardiopsis potens Yassin et al. 2009
      - - - Nocardiopsis akesuensis Gao et al. 2016
          - Nocardiopsis mwathae Akhwale et al. 2016
        - - Nocardiopsis gilva Li et al. 2006
          - - Nocardiopsis rhodophaea Li et al. 2006
            - Nocardiopsis rosea Li et al. 2006

- Nocardiopsis
  - N. ansamitocini Zhang et al. 2016
  - - - N. nikkonensis Yamamura et al. 2010
      - - N. rhizosphaerae Zhang et al. 2016
        - - N. salina Li et al. 2004
          - - N. coralli Li et al. 2021
            - - N. xinjiangensis Li et al. 2003
              - - N. kunsanensis Chun et al. 2000
                - N. litoralis Chen et al. 2009
    - - N. fildesensis Xu et al. 2014
      - - - N. flavescens Fang et al. 2011
          - N. lucentensis Yassin et al. 1993
        - - - N. algeriensis Bouras et al. 2015
            - - N. alba Grund & Kroppenstedt 1990
              - - - N. quinghaiensis Chen et al. 2008
                  - - N. arvandica Hamedi et al. 2011
                    - N. sinuspersici Hamedi et al. 2010
                - - N. halotolerans Al-Zarban et al. 2002
                  - - N. akebiae Mo et al. 2024
                    - - - N. dassonvillei (Brocq-Rousseau 1904) Meyer 1976
                        - N. deserti Asem et al. 2020
                      - - N. dassonvillei crassaminis Camacho Pozo et al. 2020
                        - N. synnemataformans Yassin et al. 1997
          - - N. aegyptia Sabry et al. 2004
            - - - N. tropica Evtushenko et al. 2000
                - N. umidischolae Peltola et al. 2002
              - - - N. alkaliphila Hozzein et al. 2004
                  - N. changdeensis Mo et al. 2024
                - - - N. eucommiae Mo et al. 2022
                    - N. prasina (Miyashita, Mikami & Arai 1984) Yassin et al. 1997
                  - - - N. terrae Chen et al. 2012
                      - - N. listeri Grund & Kroppenstedt 1990
                        - - N. nanhaiensis Pan et al. 2015
                          - N. oceani Pan et al. 2015
                    - - N. ganjiahuensis Zhang et al. 2008
                      - - N. metallicus Schippers et al. 2002
                        - - N. exhalans Peltola et al. 2002
                          - N. valliformis Yang et al. 2008

120 marker proteins based GTDB 10-RS226

- Nocardiopsis ansamitocini

- - - Nocardiopsis_B
      Nocardiopsis trehalosi
  - - Nocardiopsis_C
      - Nocardiopsis mwathae
      - - Nocardiopsis gilva
        - Nocardiopsis rosea
    - Nocardiopsis_A
      - - Nocardiopsis composta
        - Nocardiopsis potens
      - - Nocardiopsis halophila [Nocardiopsis baichengensis Li et al. 2006]
        - - Nocardiopsis chromatogenes
          - - Nocardiopsis endophytica
            - Nocardiopsis suaedae

- Nocardiopsis
  - - "Ca. N. merdipullorum" Gilroy et al. 2021
    - - - N. coralli
        - N. salina
      - - N. kunsanensis [N. litoralis]
        - N. xinjiangensis
  - - - - N. alba
        - - N. alkaliphila
          - N. listeri
      - - N. terrae
        - - - N. eucommiae
            - N. prasina
          - - N. ganjiahuensis
            - - N. exhalans
              - N. metallicus
    - - - N. aegyptia
        - N. lucentensis
      - - - N. algeriensis
          - - N. changdeensis
            - N. flavescens
        - - N. umidischolae
          - - - N. quinghaiensis
              - N. sinuspersici [N. arvandica]
            - - N. halotolerans
              - - Glycomyces fuscus Han et al. 2014
                - - N. dassonvillei [N. deserti]
                  - - N. alborubida corrig. Grund & Kroppenstedt 1990
                    - N. synnemataformans

Unassigned species:

- "N. benisuefensis" Hozzein 2003c
- "N. bonnevillensis" Scott et al. 2025
- "N. lambiniae" Nouioui et al. 2024
- "N. oceanisediminis" Kim et al. 2025
- N. protaetiae Liu et al. 2025
- "N. synnemasporogenes" El-Naggar 2014 em. Nouioui et al. 2018
- "N. tangguensis" Lu et al. 2002
- "N. viridoflava" Xie, Liu & Wang 2002b
- "N. yanglingensis" Yan et al. 2011

== See also ==
- List of bacterial orders
- List of bacteria genera
