= Streptomonospora =

Scientific classification
- Domain: Bacteria
- Kingdom: Bacillati
- Phylum: Actinomycetota
- Class: Actinomycetes
- Order: Streptosporangiales
- Family: Nocardiopsaceae
- Genus: Streptomonospora corrig. Cui et al. 2001

Type species
- Streptomonospora salina corrig. Cui et al. 2001

Species
- See text

Synonyms
- Streptimonospora (sic)

Genus of bacteria

Streptomonospora is a Gram-positive and aerobic bacterial genus from the family of Nocardiopsaceae.

== Phylogeny ==
The currently accepted taxonomy is based on the List of Prokaryotic names with Standing in Nomenclature (LPSN) and National Center for Biotechnology Information (NCBI).

16S rRNA based LTP_10_2024

- Streptomonospora
  - - S. halotolerans Zhao et al. 2015
    - S. nanhaiensis Zhang et al. 2013
  - - S. sediminis Zhang et al. 2013
    - - S. tuzyakensis Tatar et al. 2016
      - - - S. arabica corrig. (Hozzein & Goodfellow 2008) Zhang et al. 2013
          - S. halophila Cai et al. 2008
        - - S. amylolytica Cai et al. 2009
          - - S. flavalba Cai et al. 2009
            - - S. alba Li et al. 2003
              - - S. algeriensis Meklat et al. 2014
                - S. salina corrig. Cui et al. 2001

120 marker proteins based GTDB 10-RS226

- Streptomonospora
  - - "S. mangrovi" Zhen et al. 2023
    - S. nanhaiensis
  - - S. halophila
    - - S. litoralis Khodamoradi et al. 2025
      - - S. alba
        - S. salina

Species incertae sedis:

- S. wellingtoniae Nouioui et al. 2025

== See also ==
- List of bacterial orders
- List of bacteria genera
