= SGCD =

SGCD may refer to:

- Delta-sarcoglycan, a protein
- 2-Amino-4-deoxychorismate synthase, an enzyme
