= Nocardiopsis quinghaiensis =

Scientific classification
- Domain: Bacteria
- Kingdom: Bacillati
- Phylum: Actinomycetota
- Class: Actinomycetes
- Order: Streptosporangiales
- Family: Nocardiopsaceae
- Genus: Nocardiopsis
- Species: N. quinghaiensis

Binomial name
- Nocardiopsis quinghaiensis Chen et al. 2008

Type strain
- CGMCC 4.3494, DSM 44739, YIM 28A4

Species of bacterium

Nocardiopsis quinghaiensis is a Gram-positive and aerobic bacterium from the genusNocardiopsis which has been isolated from alkaline soil in Qaidam Basin in China.
