= Nocardiopsis ansamitocini =

Scientific classification
- Domain: Bacteria
- Kingdom: Bacillati
- Phylum: Actinomycetota
- Class: Actinomycetes
- Order: Streptosporangiales
- Family: Nocardiopsaceae
- Genus: Nocardiopsis
- Species: N. ansamitocini

Binomial name
- Nocardiopsis ansamitocini Zhang et al. 2016

Type strain
- CGMCC 9969, KCTC 39605, EGI 80425

Species of bacterium

Nocardiopsis ansamitocini is an alkalitolerant bacterium from the genus Nocardiopsis which has been isolated from soil from the Xinjiang province in China. Nocardiopsis ansamitocini produces ansamitocin P-3.
