= Marinactinospora =

Scientific classification
- Domain: Bacteria
- Kingdom: Bacillati
- Phylum: Actinomycetota
- Class: Actinomycetes
- Order: Streptosporangiales
- Family: Nocardiopsaceae
- Genus: Marinactinospora; Tian et al. 2009

Type species
- Marinactinospora thermotolerans Tian et al. 2009

Species
- M. endophytica; "M. rubrisoli"; M. thermotolerans

Genus of bacteria

Marinactinospora is a genus in the phylum Actinomycetota (Bacteria).

== Etymology ==
The name Marinactinospora derives from the Latin adjective marinus, of or belonging to the sea; Greek noun aktis, aktinos (ἀκτίς, ἀκτῖνος), a beam; Greek noun spora (σπορά), a seed, and in biology a spore; Neo-Latin feminine gender noun Marinactinospora, marine and spored ray, referring to marine spore-forming actinomycete. The specific name derives from the Greek noun thermē (θέρμη), heat; Latin participle adjective tolerans, tolerating; Neo-Latin participle adjective thermotolerans, able to tolerate a high temperature.)

== Phylogeny ==
The currently accepted taxonomy is based on the List of Prokaryotic names with Standing in Nomenclature (LPSN) and National Center for Biotechnology Information (NCBI).

16S rRNA based LTP_10_2024

- Marinactinospora
  - M. endophytica Liu et al. 2015
  - M. thermotolerans Tian et al. 2009

120 marker proteins based GTDB 10-RS226

- Marinactinospora
  M. thermotolerans

== See also ==
- List of bacterial orders
- List of bacteria genera
