= Nocardiopsis trehalosi =

Scientific classification
- Domain: Bacteria
- Kingdom: Bacillati
- Phylum: Actinomycetota
- Class: Actinomycetia
- Order: Streptosporangiales
- Family: Nocardiopsaceae
- Genus: Nocardiopsis
- Species: N. trehalosi

Binomial name
- Nocardiopsis trehalosi (ex Dolak et al. 1981) Evtushenko et al. 2000

Type strain
- BCRC 12529, CCRC 12529, CGMCC 4.1174, CIP 106425, DSM 44380, IFM 242, IFO 14201, JCM 3357, NBRC 14201, NRRL 12026, VKM Ac-942

Species of bacterium

Nocardiopsis trehalosi is a bacterium from the genus Nocardiopsis which has been isolated from soil.
