= Nocardiopsis halotolerans =

Scientific classification
- Domain: Bacteria
- Kingdom: Bacillati
- Phylum: Actinomycetota
- Class: Actinomycetes
- Order: Streptosporangiales
- Family: Nocardiopsaceae
- Genus: Nocardiopsis
- Species: N. halotolerans

Binomial name
- Nocardiopsis halotolerans Al-Zarban et al. 2002

Type strain
- BCRC 16376, CCRC 16376, CGMCC 4.2084, CIP 107430, DSM 44410, F100, JCM 11760, NBRC 100347, NRRL B-24124, VKM Ac-2519

Synonyms
- Nocardiopsis halototerans

Species of bacterium

Nocardiopsis halotolerans is a halotolerant bacterium from the genus Nocardiopsis which has been isolated from salt marsh soil from the desert in Kuwait.
