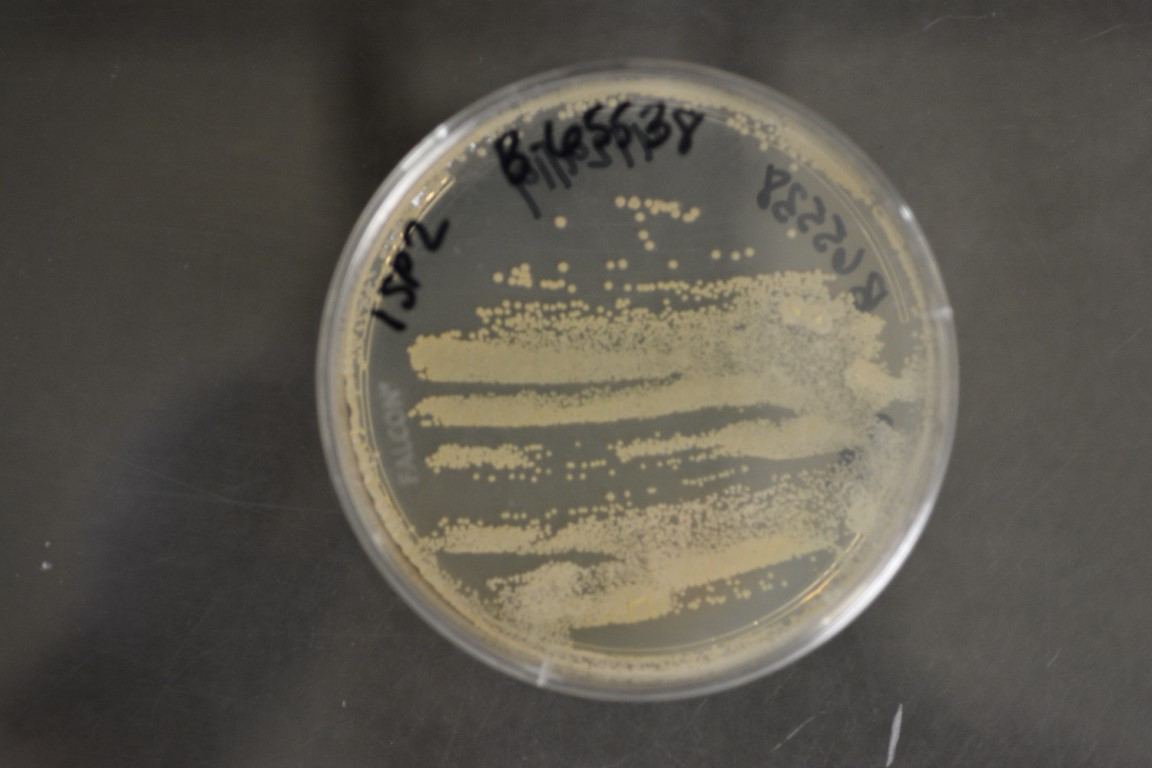
- Actinomadura macrotermitis on agar plate

Scientific classification
- Domain: Bacteria
- Kingdom: Bacillati
- Phylum: Actinomycetota
- Class: Actinomycetes
- Order: Streptosporangiales
- Family: Thermomonosporaceae
- Genus: Actinomadura; Lechevalier and Lechevalier 1968

Type species
- Actinomadura madurae (Vincent 1894) Lechevalier & Lechevalier 1968

Species
- See text

Synonyms
- Excellospora Agre and Guzeva 1975; Spirillospora Couch 1963; "Streptomycoides" Zhang, Xing & Yan 1984

= Actinomadura =

Genus of bacteria

Actinomadura is one of four genera of Actinomycetota that belong to the family Thermomonosporaceae. It contains aerobic, Gram-positive, non-acid-fast, non-motile, chemo-organotrophic actinomycetes that produce well-developed, non-fragmenting vegetative mycelia and aerial hyphae that differentiate into surface-ornamented spore chains. These chains are of various lengths and can be straight, hooked or spiral. The genus currently comprises over 70 species with validly published names with standing in nomenclature, although the species status of some strains remains uncertain, and further comparative studies are needed.

Members of the genus are not characterized chemotaxonomically by type III/B cell walls (meso-diaminopimelic acid and madurose are present) with peptidoglycan structures of the acetyl type. The predominant menaquinone types are MK-9(H4), MK-9(H6) and MK-9(H8). The phospholipid pattern is PI (diphosphatidylglycerol and phosphatidylinositol are present as major phospholipids) and the fatty acid pattern is type 3a (branched saturated and unsaturated fatty acids plus tuberculostearic acid).

== Phylogeny ==
The currently accepted taxonomy is based on the List of Prokaryotic names with Standing in Nomenclature (LPSN) and National Center for Biotechnology Information (NCBI).

16S rRNA based LTP_10_2024

- Actinomadura alba Wang et al. 2007

- Actinomadura craniellae Li et al. 2019

- - - Actinomadura scrupuli Lee and Lee 2010
    - Spirillospora rubra Schafer 1973 ex Vobis & Kothe 1989
  - - - Spirillospora albida Couch 1963
      - - Actinomadura~
          - Actinomadura fulvescens Terekhova, Galatenko & Preobrazhenskaya 1987
          - Actinomadura rudentiformis Le Roes and Meyers 2007
    - - Actinomadura
        - - - A. montaniterrae Songsumanus et al. 2016
            - - A. violacea Kanchanasin et al. 2021
              - - A. barringtoniae Rachniyom et al. 2018
                - A. nitritigenes Lipski and Altendorf 1995
          - - - A. viridilutea (Agre and Guzeva 1975) Zhang et al. 2001
              - - A. keratinilytica Puhl et al. 2009
                - A. miaoliensis Tseng et al. 2009
            - - - A. parmotrematis Somphong et al. 2022
                - - A. hibisca Tomita et al. 1991
                  - - A. kijaniata Horan and Brodsky 1982
                    - A. namibiensis Wink et al. 2003
              - - - A. flavalba Qin et al. 2009
                  - - A. atramentaria Miyadoh et al. 1987
                    - - A. rayongensis Phongsopitanun et al. 2015
                      - A. rubteroloni Benndorf et al. 2020
                - - A. macrotermitis Benndorf et al. 2020
                  - - A. rupiterrae Lee 2012
                    - - A. gamaensis Abagana et al. 2016
                      - - A. harenae Hu et al. 2020
                        - - A. logoneensis Shi et al. 2019
                          - - A. oligospora Mertz and Yao 1986
                            - A. rhizosphaerae Malisorn et al. 2018
        - - - A. apis Promnuan et al. 2011
            - - A. deserti Cao et al. 2018
              - - A. rifamycini (Gauze et al. 1987) Promnuan et al. 2011
                - - A. cremea Preobrazhenskaya et al. 1975
                  - - A. algeriensis Lahoum et al. 2017
                    - A. sediminis He et al. 2012
          - - A. physcomitrii Zhuang et al. 2020
            - - - A. fibrosa Mertz and Yao 1990
                - A. rubrisoli Ay 2021
              - - A. roseirufa Wieme et al. 2019
                - - - - A. citrea Lavrova et al. 1972
                      - A. mexicana Quintana et al. 2004
                    - - - A. formosensis (Hasegawa et al. 1986) Zhang et al. 1998
                        - A. lepetitiana Dalmastri et al. 2020
                      - - - A. glauciflava Lu et al. 2003
                          - A. luteofluorescens (Shinobu 1962) Preobrazhenskaya et al. 1975
                        - - A. coerulea Preobrazhenskaya et al. 1975
                          - A. verrucosospora Nonomura and Ohara 1971
                  - - - A. madurae (Vincent 1894) Lechevalier and Lechevalier 1970
                      - - A. meyerae corrig. Quintana et al. 2004
                        - - - A. latina Trujillo and Goodfellow 1997
                            - A. napierensis Cook et al. 2005
                          - - A. geliboluensis Sazak et al. 2012
                            - A. xylanilytica Zucchi et al. 2013
                    - - - - A. macra (ex Celmer et al. 1979) Huang 1980
                          - - A. litoris Cao et al. 2021
                            - A. terrae Lee et al. 2023
                        - - A. graeca Tarantini et al. 2022
                          - - A. pelletieri (Laveran 1906) Lechevalier and Lechevalier 1970
                            - - - A. meridiana Lee 2012
                                - A. spongiicola Qin et al. 2022
                              - - A. chibensis Hanafy et al. 2008
                                - - A. decatromicini Songsumanus et al. 2021
                                  - A. syzygii Rachniyom et al. 2015
                      - - - A. bangladeshensis Ara et al. 2008
                          - A. chokoriensis Ara et al. 2008
                        - - A. darangshiensis Lee and Kim 2015
                          - - - A. alkaliterrae Ay et al. 2017
                              - A. soli Saricaoglu et al. 2021
                            - - A. yumaensis Labeda et al. 1985
                              - - - A. catellatispora Lu et al. 2003
                                  - A. livida Lavrova and Preobrazhenskaya 1975
                                - - - A. adrarensis Lahoum et al. 2016
                                    - - A. hallensis Lee and Jeong 2006
                                      - A. sputi Yassin et al. 2010
                                  - - - A. rugatobispora Miyadoh et al. 1991
                                      - A. vinacea Lavrova and Preobrazhenskaya 1975
                                    - - A. viridis (Nonomura and Ohara 1971) Miyadoh et al. 1989
                                      - - A. jiaoheensis Zhao et al. 2016
                                        - A. sporangiiformans Zhao et al. 2016

120 marker proteins based GTDB 10-RS226

- Actinomadura alba

- Actinomadura craniellae

- Actinomadura
  - - A. viridilutea
    - - A. keratinilytica
      - A. miaoliensis
  - - - A. vinacea
      - A. viridis
    - - - A. barringtoniae
        - - A. fulvescens
          - A. rudentiformis
      - - - - - A. hibisca
              - A. kijaniata
            - - A. rupiterrae
              - - A. logoneensis
                - - A. harenae
                  - A. oligospora
          - - - A. macrotermitis
              - A. parmotrematis
            - - A. flavalba
              - - A. atramentaria
                - - A. rayongensis
                  - A. rubteroloni
        - - A. xylanilytica
          - - Spirillospora albida
            - - - A. rubrisoli
                - - A. fibrosa
                  - - A. roseirufa
                    - - - A. litoris
                        - A. terrae
                      - - A. graeca
                        - A. macra
              - - - A. napierensis
                  - - - A. nitritigenes
                      - A. verrucosospora
                    - - A. montaniterrae
                      - A. physcomitrii
                - - - A. cremea
                    - - A. algeriensis
                      - A. rifamycini
                  - - - - A. hallensis
                        - A. livida
                      - - - A. chibensis
                          - A. syzygii
                        - - A. soli
                          - - A. meridiana
                            - - A. pelletieri
                              - A. spongiicola
                    - - - A. formosensis
                        - - - A. geliboluensis
                            - A. meyerae
                          - - A. bangladeshensis
                            - A. latina
                      - - - A. darangshiensis
                          - A. madurae
                        - - - A. citrea
                            - A. mexicana
                          - - A. luteofluorescens
                            - - A. coerulea
                              - A. verrucosospora

Orphaned species:

- "Excellospora japonica" Furihata & Shimazu 1985
- "Spirillospora tritici" Song et al. 2018

Unassigned species:

- "A. albolutea" Tohyama et al. 1984
- "A. azurea" Nakamura and Isono 1983
- "A. brunnea" Patel et al. 1987
- A. hankyongensis corrig. Siddiqi et al. 2019
- "A. luzonensis" Tomita et al. 1980
- "A. maheshkhaliensis" Ara et al. 2008
- "A. melliaura" Matson et al. 1989
- "A. ochracea" Deng & Yan 1984
- "A. opuntiae" Lee, Yang & Kim 2025
- "A. parvosata" Christensen et al. 1987
- "A. pulveracea" Iwami et al. 1985
- "A. routienii" Huang 1987
- "A. spiculosospora" Koguchi et al. 1986
- "A. spinosa" Saitoh et al. 1993
- "A. vulgaris" Hegde et al. 1991
- "A. welshii" Vera-Cabrera et al. 2025

== See also ==
- List of bacterial orders
- List of bacteria genera
