= Thermomonosporaceae =

Scientific classification
- Domain: Bacteria
- Kingdom: Bacillati
- Phylum: Actinomycetota
- Class: Actinomycetes
- Order: Streptosporangiales
- Family: Thermomonosporaceae; Rainey et al. 1997

Genera
- Actinoallomurus; Actinocorallia; Actinomadura; Excellospora; Spirillospora; Thermomonospora

Synonyms
- "Thermomonosporas" Goodfellow & Williams 1983

Family of bacteria

Thermomonosporaceae is a family of bacteria that share similar genotypic and phenotypic characteristics. The family Thermomonosporaceae includes aerobic, Gram-positive, non-acid-fast, chemo-organotrophic Actinomycetota. They produce a branched substrate mycelium bearing aerial hyphae that undergo differentiation into single or short chains of arthrospores. All species of Thermomonosporaceae share the same cell wall type (type III; meso-diaminopimelic acid), a similar menaquinone profile in which MK-9(H6)is predominant, and fatty acid profile type 3a. The presence of the diagnostic sugar madurose is variable, but can be found in most species of this family. The polar lipid profiles are characterized as phospholipid type PI for most species of Thermomonospora, Actinomadura and Spirillospora. The members of Actinocorallia are characterized by phospholipid type PII.

The G+C content of the DNA lies within the range 66±72 mol%. The pattern of 16S rRNA signatures consists of nucleotides at positions 440 : 497 (C–G), 501 : 544 (C–G), 502 : 543 (G–C), 831 : 855 (G–G), 843 (U), 844 (A) and 1355 : 1367 (A–U). The type genus is Thermomonospora

== Phylogeny ==
The currently accepted taxonomy is based on the List of Prokaryotic names with Standing in Nomenclature (LPSN) and National Center for Biotechnology Information (NCBI).

16S rRNA based LTP_10_2024

- Thermomonosporaceae
  - Actinoallomurus
  - - Actinomadura alba
    - - Actinomadura craniellae
      - - Thermomonospora
        - - Thermomonospora echinospora
          - - Actinocorallia
            - - - Spirillospora rubra
                - Actinomadura scrupuli
              - - - Spirillospora Couch 1963
                  - Actinomadura~
                - Actinomadura [incl. Excellospora]

120 marker proteins based GTDB 10-RS226

- Streptosporangiales Streptosporangiaceae s.l.
  - {Treboniaceae}
  - - - {Nocardiopsaceae}
      - - {Thermomonosporaceae}
          - Actinoallomurus Tamura et al. 2009
          - - - Actinomadura alba
              - Actinocorallia Iinuma et al. 1994
            - - - Actinomadura craniellae
                - Thermomonospora Henssen 1957
              - Spirillospora Couch 1963 [incl.
                Actinomadura Lechevalier and Lechevalier
                1970; Excellospora Agre & Guzeva 1975]
    - {Streptosporangiaceae s.s.}

== See also ==
- List of bacterial orders
- List of bacteria genera
