= Maduropeptin =

Chemical complex

(−)-Maduropeptin chromophore C-5 methanol adduct

Maduropeptin consists of a 1:1 complex of a carrier protein (MdpA) and a chromophore isolated from Actinomadura madurae. The chromophore has an enediyne structure and is an antibiotic with anticancer activity.
