= 2-Amino-4-deoxychorismate synthase =

Class of enzymes

2-amino-4-deoxychorismate synthase

Identifiers
- EC no.: 2.6.1.86

Databases
- IntEnz: IntEnz view
- BRENDA: BRENDA entry
- ExPASy: NiceZyme view
- KEGG: KEGG entry
- MetaCyc: metabolic pathway
- PRIAM: profile
- PDB structures: RCSB PDB PDBe PDBsum
Search
- PMC: articles
- PubMed: articles
- NCBI: proteins

2-amino-4-deoxychorismate synthase (EC 2.6.1.86, ADIC synthase, 2-amino-2-deoxyisochorismate synthase, SgcD) is an enzyme with systematic name (2S)-2-amino-4-deoxychorismate:2-oxoglutarate aminotransferase. This enzyme catalyses the following chemical reaction

Antibiotic C-1027

This reaction is an early part of the biosynthesis of the benzoxazolinate fragment of the enediyne antitumour antibiotic C-1027 from Streptomyces globisporus. 2-amino-2-deoxyisochorismic acid is produced from chorismic acid by transamination using glutamine as the source of the amino group:

chorismic acid
+ glutamine
2-amino-2-deoxyisochorismic acid
+ glutamic acid

The enzyme requires Mg^{2+}.
