= Streptomyces globisporus =

Scientific classification
- Domain: Bacteria
- Kingdom: Bacillati
- Phylum: Actinomycetota
- Class: Actinomycetes
- Order: Streptomycetales
- Family: Streptomycetaceae
- Genus: Streptomyces
- Species: S. globisporus

Binomial name
- Streptomyces globisporus (Krassilnikov 1941) Waksman 1953 (Approved Lists 1980)

Type strain
- ATCC 15864; ATCC 23913; BCRC 11479; CBS 834.68; CCRC 11479; CCUG 11107; DSM 40199; IFO 12867; INMI 2302; JCM 4378; KCTC 9026; NBRC 12867; NCAIM B.01476; NCIB 9796; NCIMB 9796; NRRL B-2872; NRRL ISP-5199; RIA 1151; RIA 335; VKM Ac-179

Synonyms
- "Actinomyces albovinaceus" Kudrina 1957; "Actinomyces globisporus" Krassilnikov 1941; Streptomyces albovinaceus (Kudrina 1957) Pridham et al. 1958 (Approved Lists 1980); Streptomyces griseinus Waksman 1959 (Approved Lists 1980); Streptomyces mediolani Arcamone et al. 1969 (Approved Lists 1980)

Species of bacterium

Streptomyces globisporus is a soil-dwelling Gram-positive bacterium. C-1027 is produced by this species, which is one of the most potent antitumor agents.
