= C-1027 =

C-1027 chromophore

Names
- IUPAC name (3R,4R,14R,19S)-22-chloro-4-{[(2S,3R,4R,5S)-5-(dimethylamino)-3,4-dihydroxy-6,6-dimethyloxan-2-yl]oxy}-23-hydroxy-14-(3-hydroxy-7-methoxy-2-methylidene-2H-1,4-benzoxazine-5-carbonyloxy)-17-oxo-2,16-dioxapentacyclo[18.2.2.1^{9,13}.0^{3,10}.0^{4,8}]pentacosa-1(22),5,7,9,11,13(25),20,23-octaen-19-amin
- Other names Lidamycin chromophore

Identifiers
CAS Number	149438-20-0
3D model (JSmol)	Interactive image; Aromatized chromophore:: Interactive image
ChEBI	CHEBI:68320
ChEMBL	ChEMBL506048
ChemSpider	8138248
DrugBank	Aromatized chromophore:: DB03933
KEGG	C11438
PubChem CID	9962646; Aromatized chromophore:: 5289301
- InChI: InChI=1S/C43H42ClN3O13/c1-21-39(52)46-34-26(17-25(54-6)18-30(34)56-21)40(53)57-31-20-55-33(49)19-28(45)23-15-27(44)37(29(48)16-23)58-32-11-7-9-22(31)12-13-24-10-8-14-43(24,32)60-41-36(51)35(50)38(47(4)5)42(2,3)59-41/h8-10,14-18,28,31-32,35-36,38,41,48,50-51H,1,19-20,45H2,2-6H3,(H,46,52)/b22-9+/t28-,31-,32+,35-,36+,38-,41-,43+/m0/s1 Key: DGGZCXUXASNDAC-QQNGCVSVSA-N
- SMILES: CC1([C@H]([C@H]([C@H]([C@@H](O1)O[C@]23C=CC=C2C#C/C/4=C\C#C[C@H]3OC5=C(C=C(C=C5Cl)[C@H](CC(=O)OC[C@@H]4OC(=O)C6=CC(=CC7=C6NC(=O)C(=C)O7)OC)N)O)O)O)N(C)C)C; Aromatized chromophore:: [H]N1C(=O)C(=C)OC2=CC(OC)=CC(C(=O)O[C@H]3COC(=O)C[C@@H](C4=CC(O)=C(O[C@]5([H])C6=C(C=C3C=C6)C3=CC=C[C@]53O[C@@H]3OC(C)(C)[C@H]([C@@H](O)[C@H]3O)N(C)C)C(Cl)=C4)[N+]([H])([H])[H])=C12

Properties
Chemical formula	C_{43}H_{42}ClN_{3}O_{13}
Molar mass	844.267 g·mol−1
- Except where otherwise noted, data are given for materials in their standard state (at 25 °C [77 °F], 100 kPa). Infobox references

C-1027 or lidamycin is an antitumor antibiotic consisting of a complex of an enediyne chromophore and an apoprotein. It shows antibiotic activity against most Gram-positive bacteria. It is one of the most potent cytotoxic molecules known, due to its induction of a higher ratio of DNA double-strand breaks than single-strand breaks.

C-1027's chromophore contains a nine-membered enediyne that is responsible for most of the molecule's biological activity. Unlike other enediynes, this molecule contains no triggering mechanism. It is already primed to undergo the cycloaromatization reaction without external activation to produce the toxic 1,4-benzenoid diradical species. C-1027 can induce oxygen-independent interstrand DNA crosslinks in addition to the oxygen-dependent single- and double-stranded DNA breaks typically generated by other enediynes. This unique oxygen-independent mechanism suggests that C-1027 may be effective against hypoxic tumor cells.

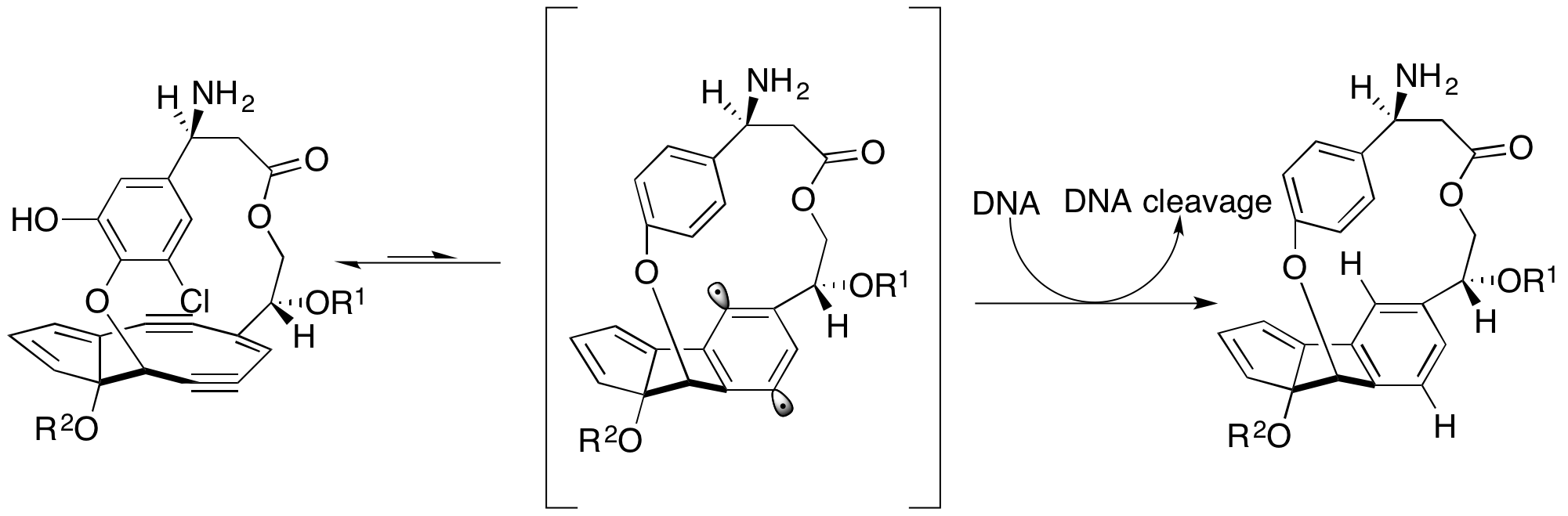
C-1027 Mechanism

C-1027 shows promise as an anticancer drug and is currently undergoing phase II clinical trials in China, with a 30% success rate. It can induce apoptosis in many cancer cells and recent studies have indicated that it induces unusual DNA damage responses to double-strand breaks, including altering cell cycle progression and inducing chromosomal aberrations.

== Biosynthesis ==
=== Enediyne ===
The structure of C-1027 is composed of a nine-membered enediyne complex, a deoxygenated aminosugar, a β-amino acid, and a benzoxazolinate moiety. Enediynes contain a double bond between two triple bonds, and their biosynthesis is distinct from other known polyketide and fatty-acid synthesis paradigms. The enediyne PKS, PKSE, from S. globisporusresponsible for the biosynthesis of the C-1027 enediyne is an ACP dependent protein with ketoacylsynthase (KS), acyltransferase (AT), ketoreductase (KR), and dehydratase (DH) domains. PKSE also contains a C-termianal PPTase domain, and the process is terminated by a thioesterase (TE). Starting with acetyl-CoA, PKSE iteratively combines 7 units of malonyl-CoA creating an intermediate heptaene, which is then catalyzed by accessory enzymes into a 9 membered enediyne. There is also a remarkable similarity between the biosynthesis of 9-membered and 10-membered enediynes such as the anticancer drug Calicheamicin.

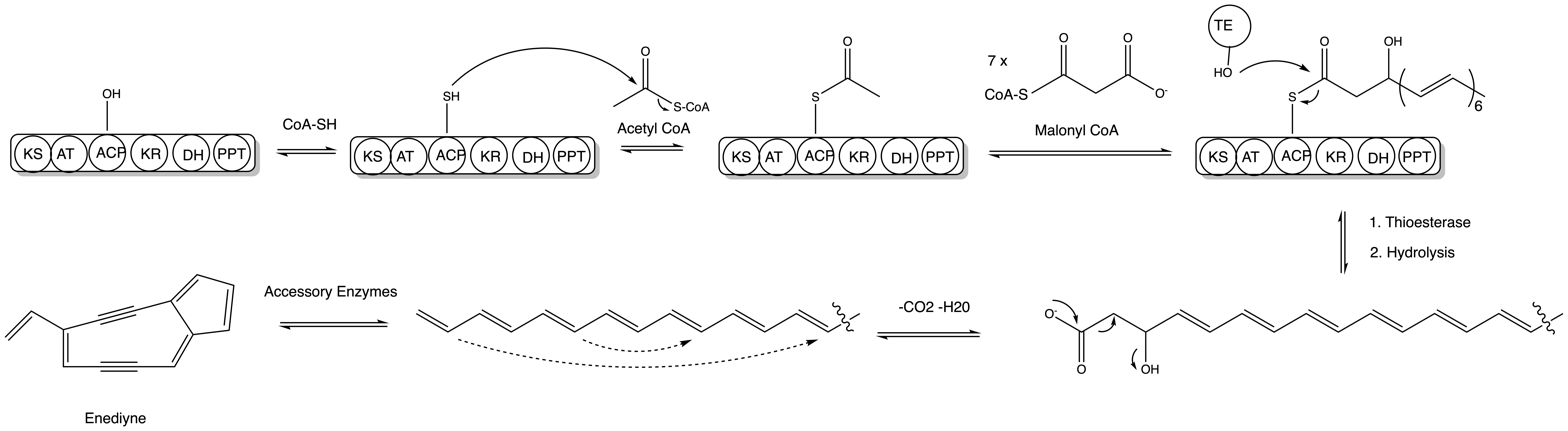
Enediyne Biosynthesis

=== Deoxy Aminosugar ===
The deoxy aminosugar found in C-1027 is derived from 5-glucose-1-phosphate. The C-1027 gene cluster contains a thymine diphosphate glucose synthetase (SgcA1), a TDP-glucose 4,6-dehydratase (SgcA2), a TDP-4-keto-6-deoxyglucose epimerase (SgcA2), a C-methyl transferase (SgcA3), an amino transferase (SgcA4), an N-methyl transferase (SgcA5), and a glycosyl transferase (SgcA6). These are all the necessary enzymes to synthesize the deoxy aminosugar and attach it to the enediyne core.

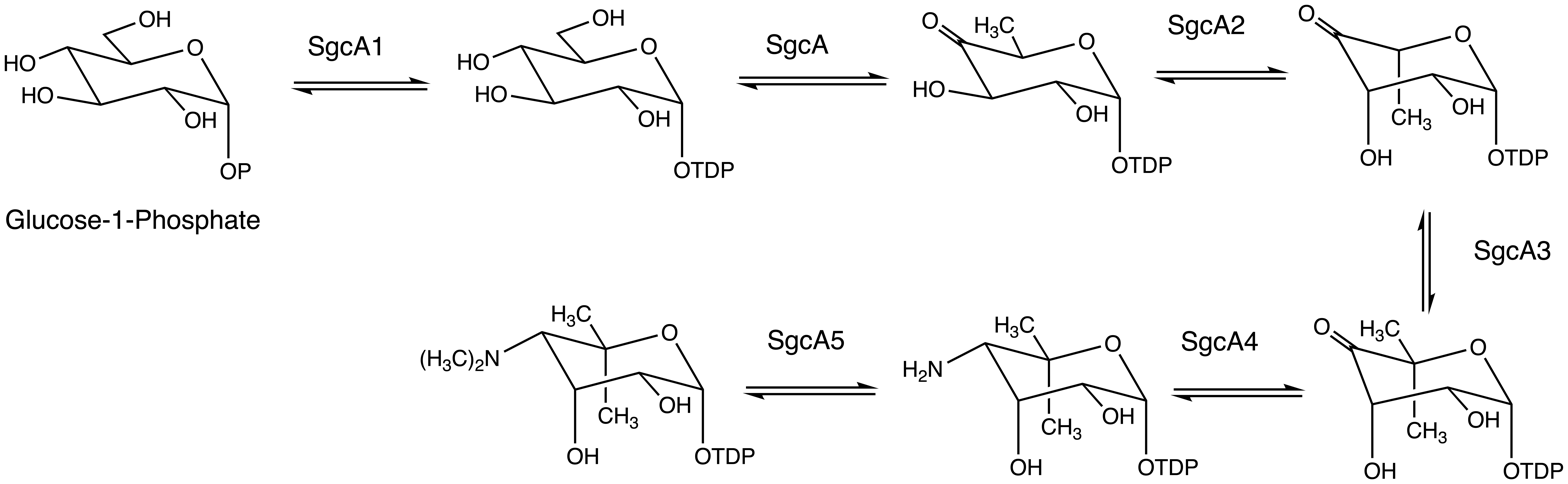
Deoxy Aminosugar Biosynthesis

=== β-Amino Acid ===
The β-amino acid moiety is a non-ribosomal peptide synthesized from tyrosine. The necessary enzymes for its biosynthesis include a phenol hydroxylase (SgcC), a nonribosomal peptide synthetase adenylation enzyme (SgcC1), an NRPS peptidyl–carrier protein (SgcC2), a halogenase (SgcC3), an aminomutase (SgcC4), and an NRPS-condensation enzyme (SgcC5). All of these enzymes are encoded for within the C-1027 biosynthetic gene cluster.

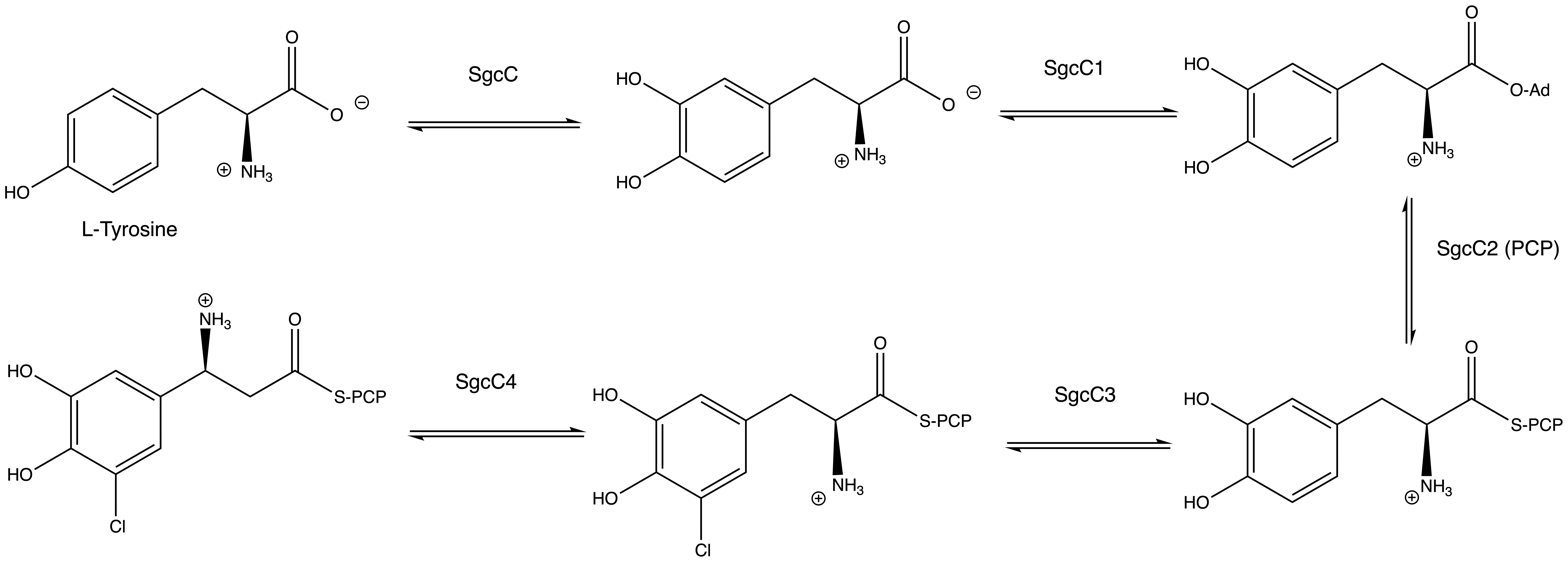
B-Amino Acid Biosynthesis

=== Benzoxazolinate ===
The benzoxazolinate moiety is synthesized from chorismate, which itself is biosynthesized from the shikimate pathway. Chorismate is sequentially acted upon by 2-amino-4-deoxychorismate synthase, and an iron–sulfur FMN-dependent ADIC dehydrogenase to synthesize 3-enolpyruvoylanthranilate (OPA). OPA is then further catalyzed into the benzoxazolinate precursor for C-1027.

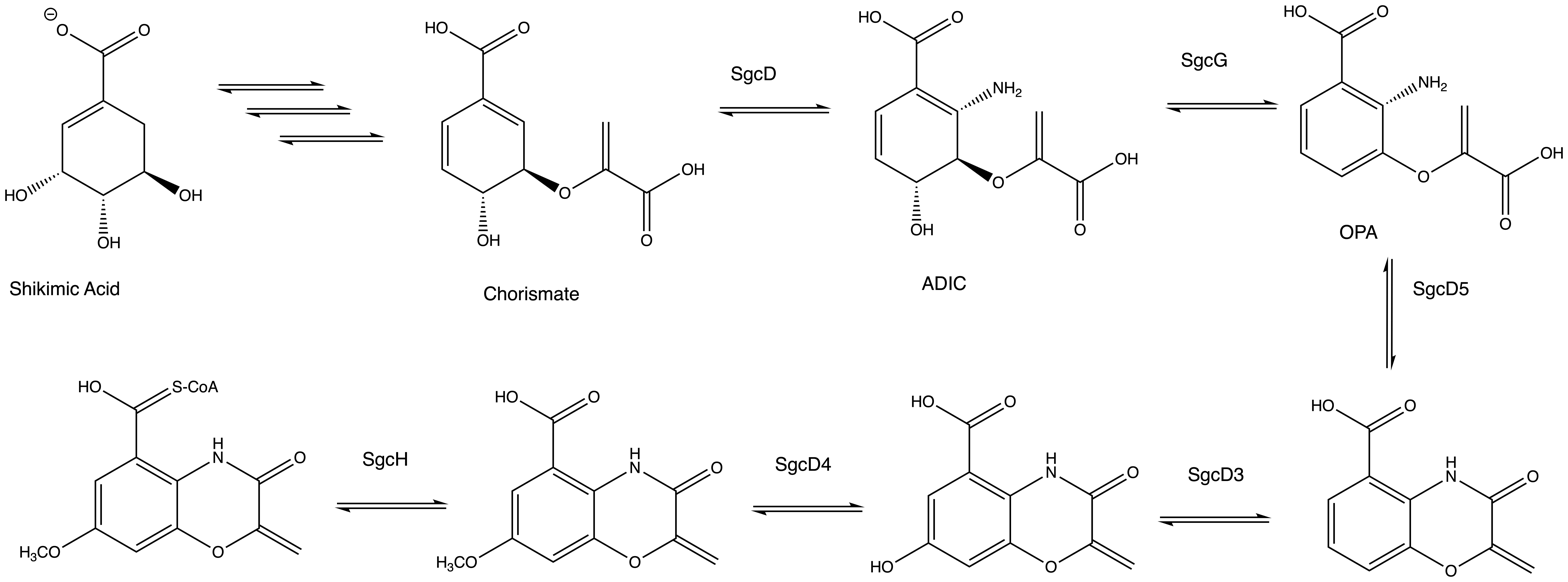
Benzoxazolinate Biosynthesis

=== C-1027 ===
The four building blocks are then combined into C-1027, although the exact mechanisms and order of this is relatively unknown.

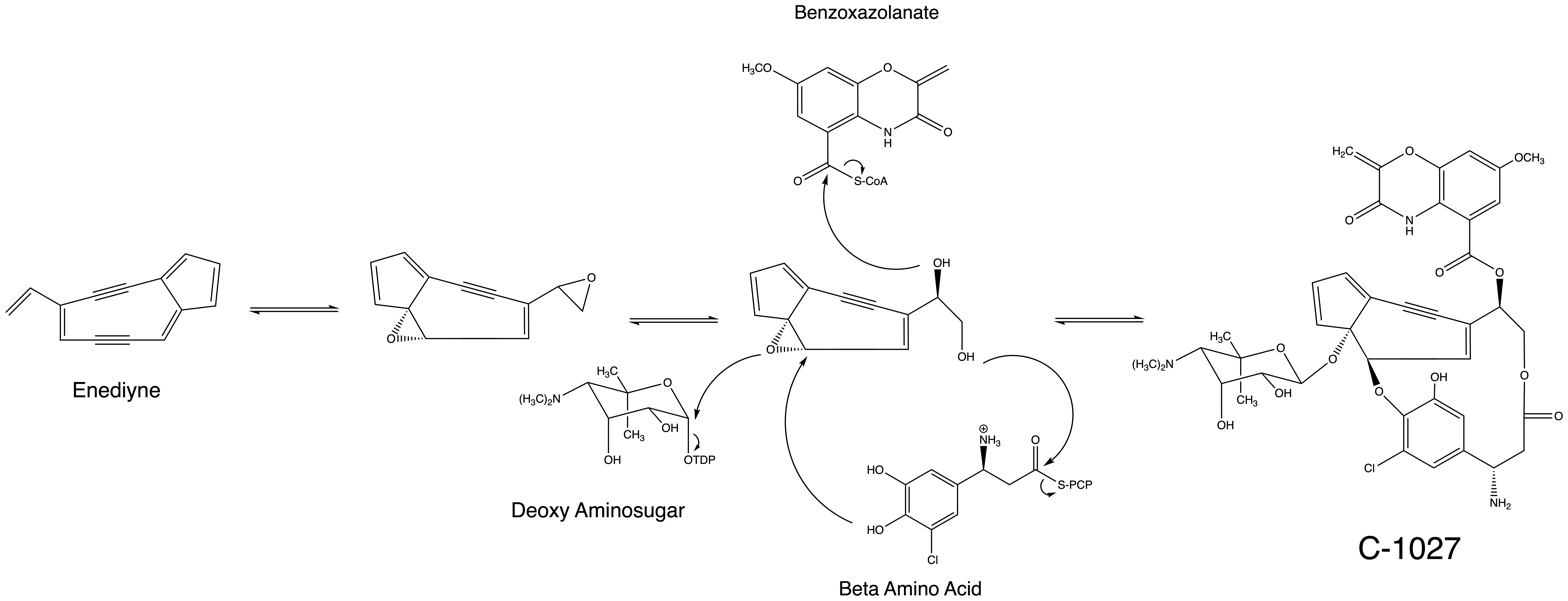
C-1027 Biosynthesis
