= Trebonia =

Scientific classification
- Domain: Bacteria
- Kingdom: Bacillati
- Phylum: Actinomycetota
- Class: Actinomycetes
- Order: Streptosporangiales
- Family: Treboniaceae; Rapoport et al. 2020
- Genus: Trebonia; Rapoport et al. 2020
- Species: T. kvetii

Binomial name
- Trebonia kvetii Rapoport et al. 2020

Genus of bacteria

Trebonia kvetii is a species of bacteria. It is the only species in the genus Trebonia.
