= Nocardiopsaceae =

Scientific classification
- Domain: Bacteria
- Kingdom: Bacillati
- Phylum: Actinomycetota
- Class: Actinomycetes
- Order: Streptosporangiales
- Family: Nocardiopsaceae; Rainey et al. 1996

Genera
- See text

Family of bacteria

The Nocardiopsaceae are a family of bacteria.

== Phylogeny ==
The currently accepted taxonomy is based on the List of Prokaryotic names with Standing in Nomenclature (LPSN) and National Center for Biotechnology Information (NCBI).

16S rRNA based LTP_10_2024

- Nocardiopsidaceae
  - Allonocardiopsis Du et al. 2013
  - - - - Allosalinactinospora Guo et al. 2015
        - Lipingzhangella Zhang et al. 2016c
      - - Salinactinospora Chang et al. 2012
        - Spiractinospora Claverías et al. 2022
    - - Haloactinospora Tang, Tian & Xu 2008
      - - Streptomonospora corrig. Cui et al. 2001
        - - Nocardiopsis trehalosi Dolak, Castle &
            Laborde 1981 ex Evtushenko et al. 2000
          - - Nocardiopsis~
            - - Marinitenerispora Ng et al. 2019
              - - Thermobifida Zhang, Wang & Ruan 1998
                - - - Murinocardiopsis Kämpfer et al. 2010
                    - Spinactinospora Chang, Liu & Zhang 2011
                  - - Marinactinospora Tian et al. 2009
                    - - Actinorugispora Liu et al. 2015
                      - Nocardiopsis (Brocq-Rousseau 1904) Meyer 1976

120 marker proteins based GTDB 10-RS226

- Streptosporangiaceae s.l.
  - {Treboniaceae}
  - - - {Thermomonosporaceae}
      - - {Nocardiopsidaceae}
          - Allonocardiopsis
          - - - "Lipingzhangella rawalii"
              - Spiractinospora
            - - - - Murinocardiopsis
                  - - - Marinitenerispora
                      - - Spinactinospora
                        - Marinactinospora
                    - - - Actinorugispora
                        - Nocardiopsis ansamitocini Zhang et al. 2016
                      - Thermobifida
                - - - - Haloactinospora
                      - Salinactinospora
                    - - Allosalinactinospora
                      - Lipingzhangella
                  - - Nocardiopsis_A, B & C
                    - Streptomonospora
              - Nocardiopsis
    - {Streptosporangiaceae s.s.}

== See also ==
- List of bacterial orders
- List of bacteria genera
