= Streptosporangiales =

Scientific classification
- Domain: Bacteria
- Kingdom: Bacillati
- Phylum: Actinomycetota
- Class: Actinomycetes
- Order: Streptosporangiales; Goodfellow 2015

Families
- Nocardiopsidaceae; Streptosporangiaceae; Thermomonosporaceae; Treboniaceae

Synonyms
- "Maduromycetes" Goodfellow & Williams 1983; Streptosporangiineae corrig. Ward-Rainey et al. 1997

Order of bacteria

The Streptosporangiales are an order of bacteria.

== Phylogeny ==
The currently accepted taxonomy is based on the List of Prokaryotic names with Standing in Nomenclature (LPSN) and National Center for Biotechnology Information (NCBI).

Whole-genome analysis. (Note: Treboniaceae is not included in this phylogenetic tree.)

- Streptosporangiales
  - - Allonocardiopsis Du et al. 2013
    - Nocardiopsidaceae
  - - Thermomonosporaceae
    - Streptosporangiaceae

16S rRNA based LTP_10_2024

- Streptosporangiales
  - Treboniaceae
  - - Thermobispora Wang, Zhang & Ruan 1996
    - - Streptosporangiaceae
      - - Nocardiopsidaceae
        - Thermomonosporaceae

120 marker proteins based GTDB 10-RS226

- Streptosporangiales
  Streptosporangiaceae s.l. [incl. Nocardiopsidaceae; Thermomonosporaceae; Treboniaceae]

== See also ==
- List of bacterial orders
- List of bacteria genera
