= Bioplastic =

Plastics derived from renewable biomass sources

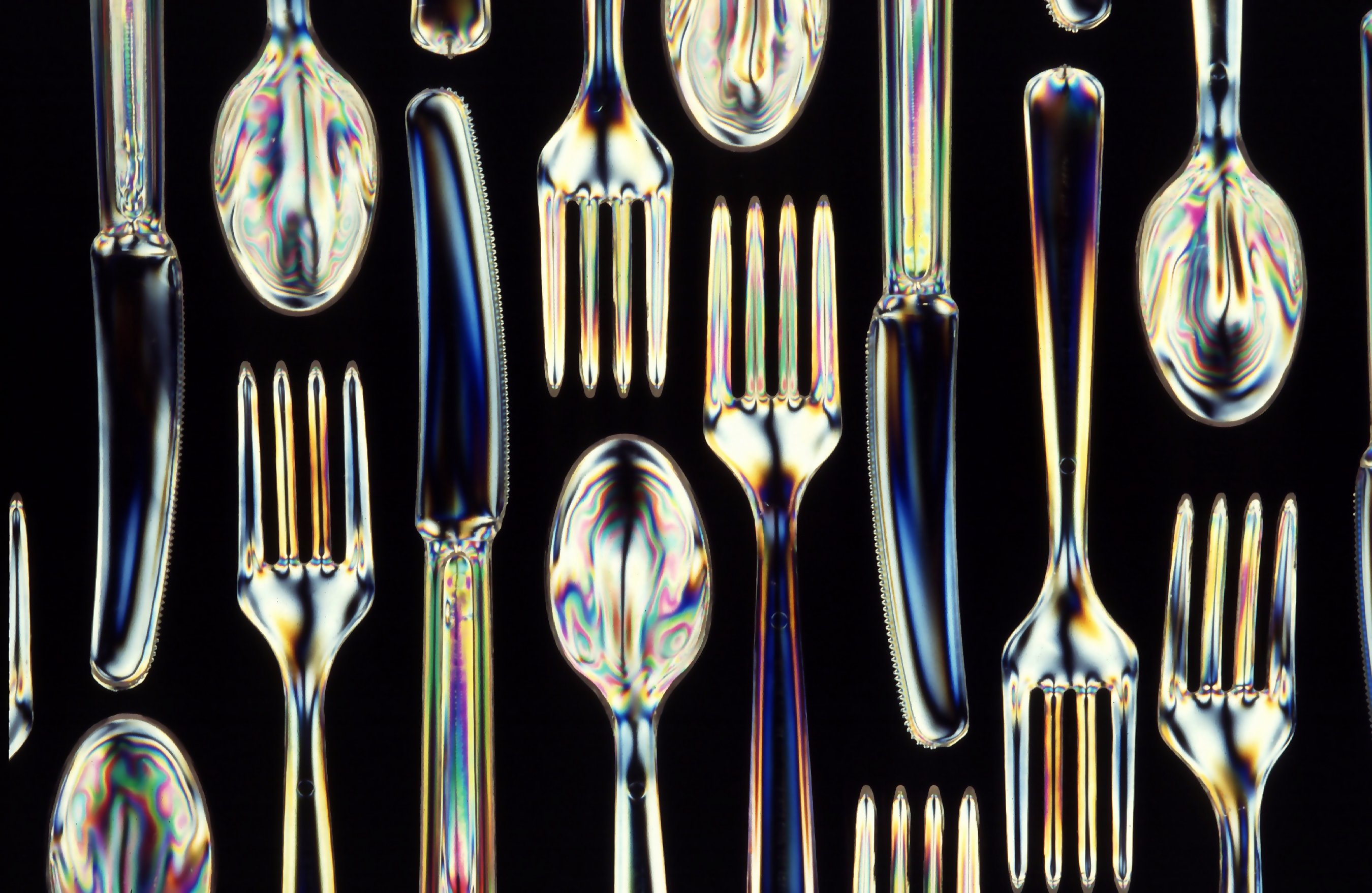
Biodegradable plastic utensils

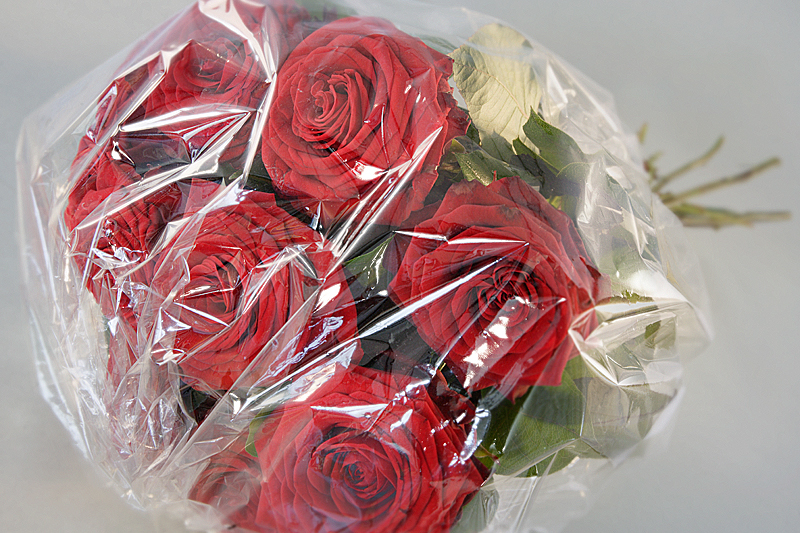
Flower wrapping made of PLA-blend bio-flex

Bioplastics (or bio-based plastics) are plastic materials produced from renewable biomass sources rather than petrochemical sources. This definition distinguishes it from biodegradable plastics, which are plastics that degrade by the natural action of microorganisms such as algae or bacteria. In the context of bioeconomy and the circular economy, bioplastics remain topical.

The four main classes of bioplastics can be described as such:

- Natural biopolymers: bioplastics processed from biopolymers with added plasticizers or stabilizers, such as polysaccharides (e.g., corn starch or rice starch, cellulose, chitosan, and alginate) and proteins (e.g., soy protein, gluten, and gelatin) or some forms of lipids (e.g., paraffin, lignin, and acetin)
- Chemical synthesis: bioplastics chemically synthesized from sugar derivatives (e.g., lactic acid) and lipids (such as vegetable fats and oils) from either plants or animals
- Microbial synthesis: bioplastics formed from fermentation of sugars or lipids or biotechnological production in microorganisms or genetically modified plants (e.g., polyhydroxyalkanoates (PHA)).
- Nonbiodegradable bioplastics/drop-in bioplastics: bioplastics moderately produced from biomass (typically copolymerized or blended with conventional petrol-based plastics) to manufacture "bio-attributed" or "mass-balanced" plastic (e.g. Bio-PE, resin, and Bio-PET).

The first three classes are biodegradable while the last class is non-degradable (durable). Whether any kind of plastic is degradable or durable depends on its molecular structure, not on whether or not the biomass constituting the raw material is fossilized. Both durable bioplastics, such as Bio-PET or biopolyethylene (bio-based analogues of fossil-based polyethylene terephthalate and polyethylene), and degradable bioplastics, such as polylactic acid, polybutylene succinate, or polyhydroxyalkanoates, exist.

One advantage of bioplastics is their independence from fossil fuel as a raw material, which is a finite and globally unevenly distributed resource linked to petroleum politics and environmental impacts. Bioplastics can utilize previously unused waste materials (e.g., straw, woodchips, sawdust, and food waste). Life cycle analysis studies show that some bioplastics can be made with a lower carbon footprint than their fossil counterparts, for example when biomass is used as raw material and also for energy production. However, other bioplastics' processes are less efficient and result in a higher carbon footprint than fossil plastics.

Some consumer products tout the use of bioplastics as a means to earn "green" credentials. Many skeptics believe that bioplastics will not solve problems as others expect.

Bioplastics must be recycled similar to fossil-based plastics to avoid plastic pollution; "drop-in" bioplastics (such as biopolyethylene) fit into existing recycling streams. On the other hand, recycling biodegradable bioplastics in the current recycling streams poses additional challenges, as it may raise the cost of sorting and decrease the yield and the quality of the recyclate. However, biodegradation is not the only acceptable end-of-life disposal pathway for biodegradable bioplastics, and mechanical and chemical recycling are often the preferred choice from the environmental point of view.

Biodegradability may offer an end-of-life pathway in certain applications, such as agricultural mulch, but the concept of biodegradation is not as straightforward as many believe. Susceptibility to biodegradation is highly dependent on the chemical backbone structure of the polymer, and different bioplastics have different structures, thus it cannot be assumed that bioplastic in the environment will readily disintegrate. Conversely, biodegradable plastics can also be synthesized from fossil fuels.

As of 2018, bioplastics represented approximately 2% of the global plastics output (>380 million tons). In 2022, the commercially most important types of bioplastics were PLA and products based on starch.

== IUPAC definition ==
The International Union of Pure and Applied Chemistry define biobased polymer as:

Biobased polymer derived from the biomass or issued from monomers derived from the biomass and which, at some stage in its processing into finished products, can be shaped by flow.

Note 1: Bioplastic is generally used as the opposite of polymer derived from fossil resources.
Note 2: Bioplastic is misleading because it suggests that any polymer derived from the biomass is environmentally friendly.
Note 3: The use of the term "bioplastic" is discouraged. Use the expression "biobased polymer".
Note 4: A biobased polymer similar to a petrobased one does not imply any superiority with respect to the environment unless the comparison of respective life cycle assessments is favourable.

== Types ==
=== Polysaccharide-based bioplastics ===
==== Starch-based plastics ====
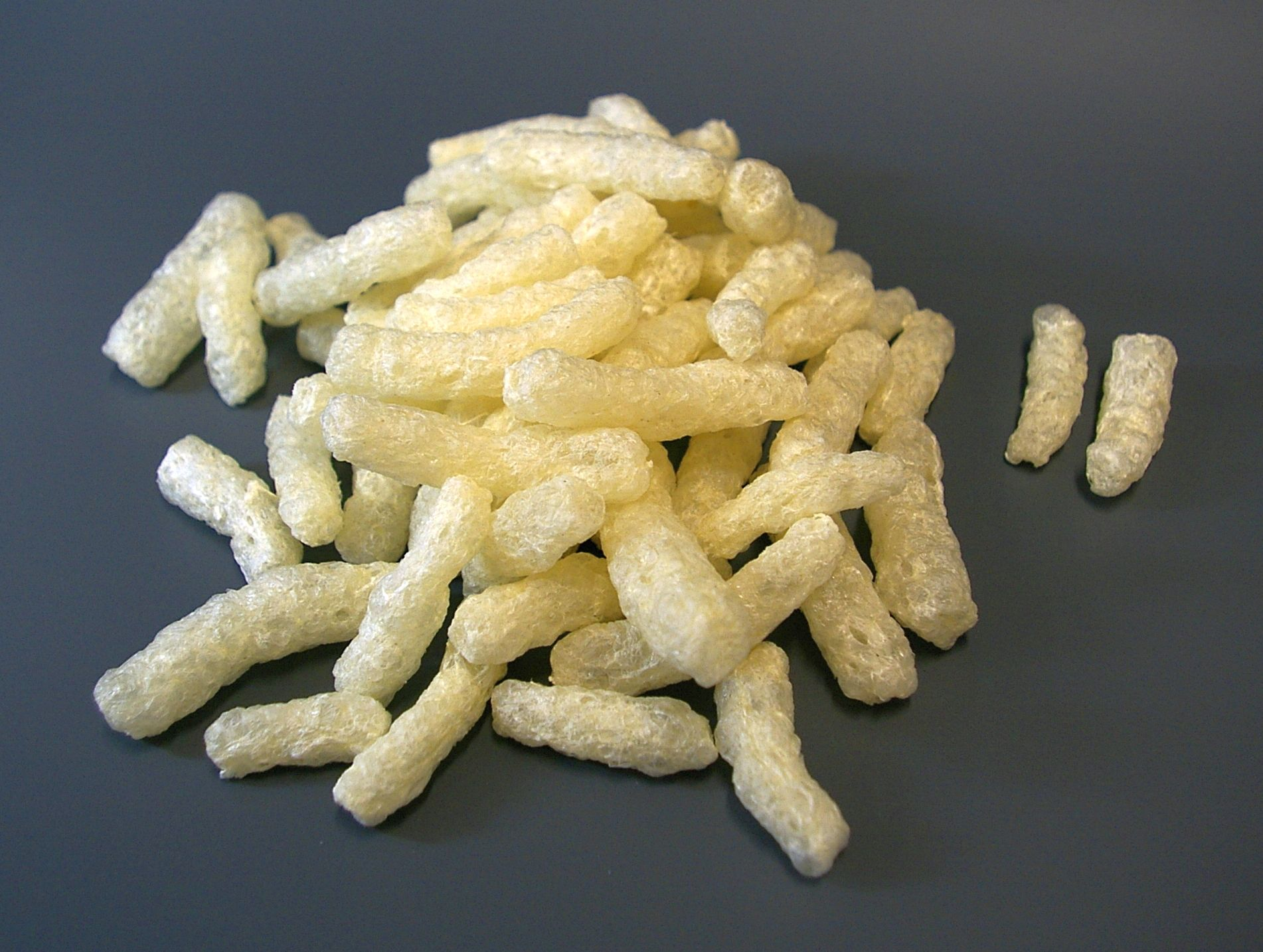
Packaging peanuts made from bioplastics (thermoplastic starch)

Thermoplastic starch represents the most widely used bioplastic, constituting about 50 percent of the bioplastics market. Simple starch bioplastic film can be made at home by gelatinizing starch and solution casting. Pure starch is able to absorb humidity, and is thus a suitable material for the production of drug capsules by the pharmaceutical sector. However, pure starch-based bioplastic is brittle. Plasticizers such as glycerol, glycol, and sorbitol can also be added so that the starch can also be processed thermo-plastically. The characteristics of the resulting bioplastic (also called "thermoplastic starch") can be tailored to specific needs by adjusting the amounts of these additives. Conventional polymer processing techniques can be used to process starch into bioplastic, such as extrusion, injection molding, compression molding and solution casting. The properties of starch bioplastic is largely influenced by amylose/amylopectin ratio. Generally, high-amylose starch results in superior mechanical properties. However, high-amylose starch has less processability because of its higher gelatinization temperature and higher melt viscosity.

Starch-based bioplastics are often blended with biodegradable polyesters to produce starch/polylactic acid, starch/polycaprolactone or starch/Ecoflex (polybutylene adipate-co-terephthalate produced by BASF) blends. These blends are used for industrial applications and are also compostable. Other producers, such as Roquette, have developed other starch/polyolefin blends. These blends are not biodegradable, but have a lower carbon footprint than petroleum-based plastics used for the same applications.

Starch is cheap, abundant, and renewable.

Starch-based films (mostly used for packaging purposes) are made mainly from starch blended with thermoplastic polyesters to form biodegradable and compostable products. These films are seen specifically in consumer goods packaging of magazine wrappings and bubble films. In food packaging, these films are seen as bakery or fruit and vegetable bags. Composting bags with this films are used in selective collecting of organic waste. Further, starch-based films can be used as a paper.

Starch-based nanocomposites have been widely studied, showing improved mechanical properties, thermal stability, moisture resistance, and gas barrier properties.

==== Cellulose-based plastics ====
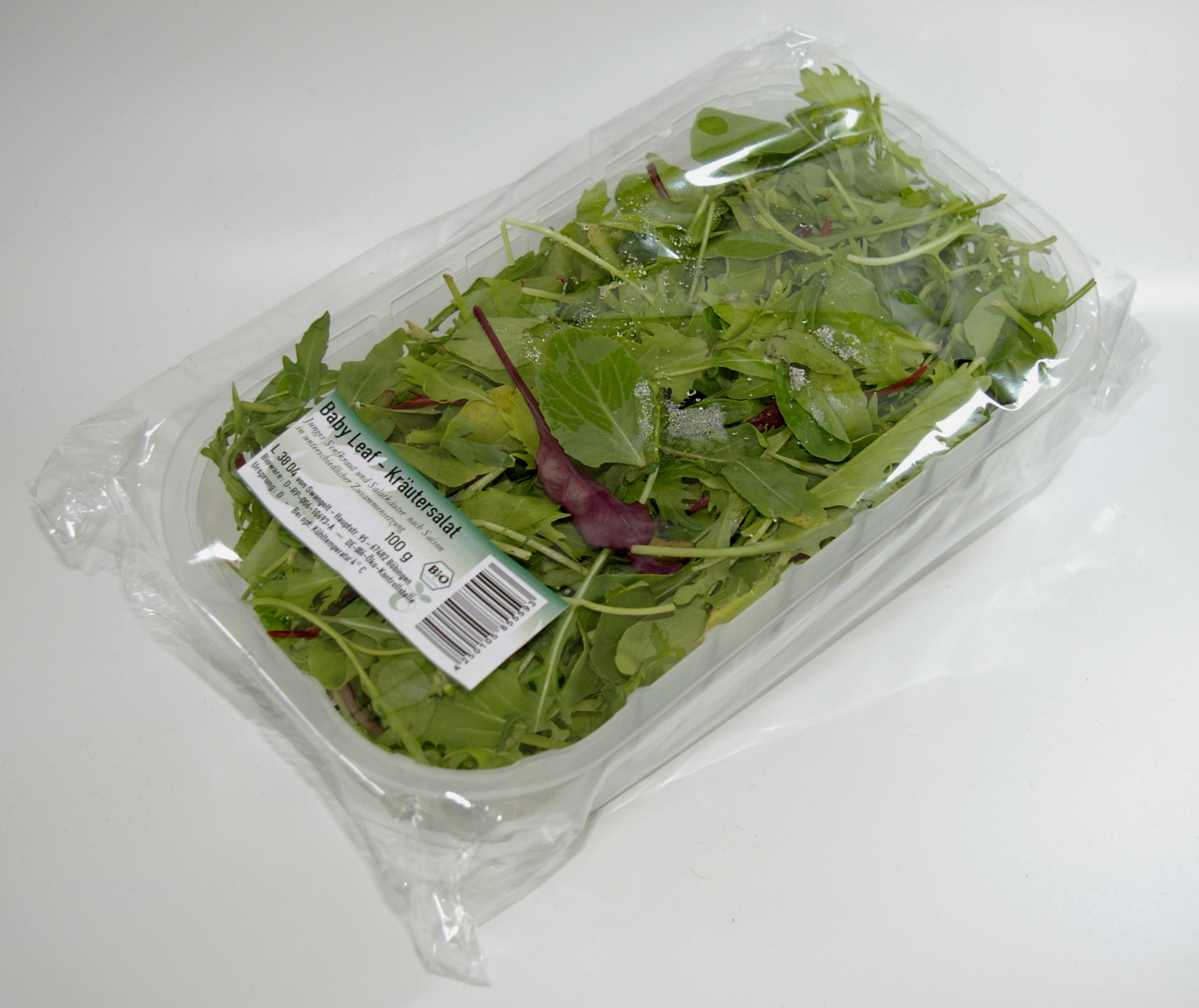
A packaging blister made from cellulose acetate, a bioplastic

Cellulose bioplastics are mainly the cellulose esters (including cellulose acetate and nitrocellulose) and their derivatives, including celluloid.

Cellulose can become thermoplastic when extensively modified. An example of this is cellulose acetate, which is expensive and therefore rarely used for packaging. However, cellulosic fibers added to starches can improve mechanical properties, permeability to gas, and water resistance due to being less hydrophilic than starch.

=== Protein-based plastics ===
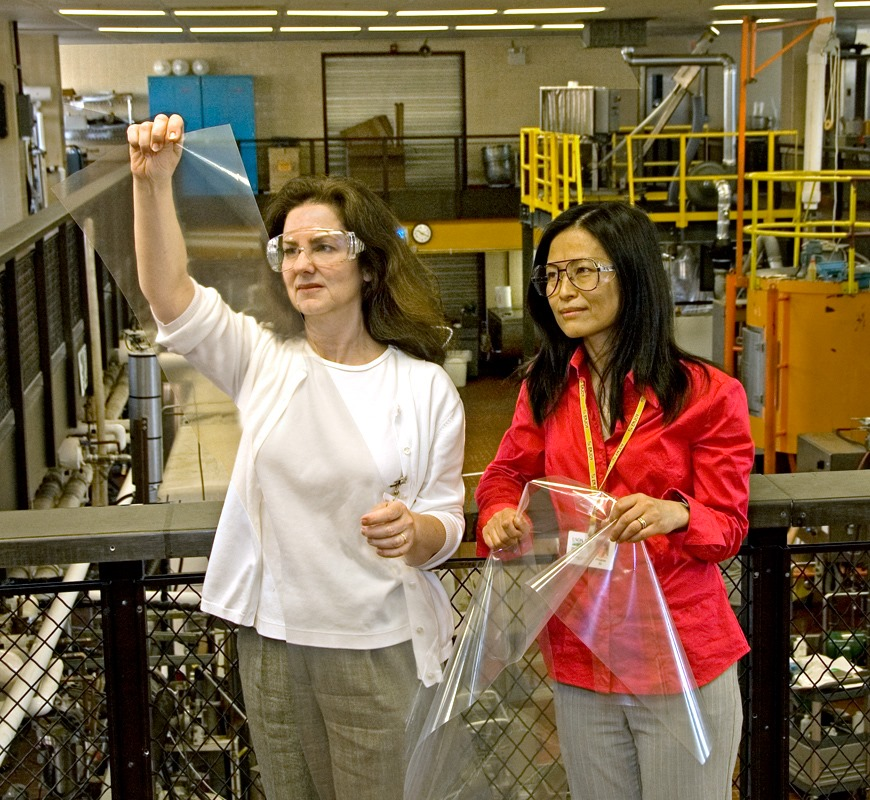
Development of an edible casein film overwrap at USDA

Bioplastics can be made from proteins from different sources. For example, wheat gluten and casein show promising properties as a raw material for different biodegradable polymers.

Additionally, soy protein is being considered as another source of bioplastic. Soy proteins have been used in plastic production for over one hundred years. For example, body panels of an original Ford automobile were made of soy-based plastic.

There are difficulties with using soy protein-based plastics due to their water sensitivity and relatively high cost. Therefore, producing blends of soy protein with some already-available biodegradable polyesters improves the water sensitivity and cost.

=== Some aliphatic polyesters ===
The aliphatic biopolyesters are mainly polyhydroxyalkanoates (PHAs) like the poly-3-hydroxybutyrate (PHB), polyhydroxyvalerate (PHV) and polyhydroxyhexanoate (PHH).

==== Polylactic acid (PLA) ====
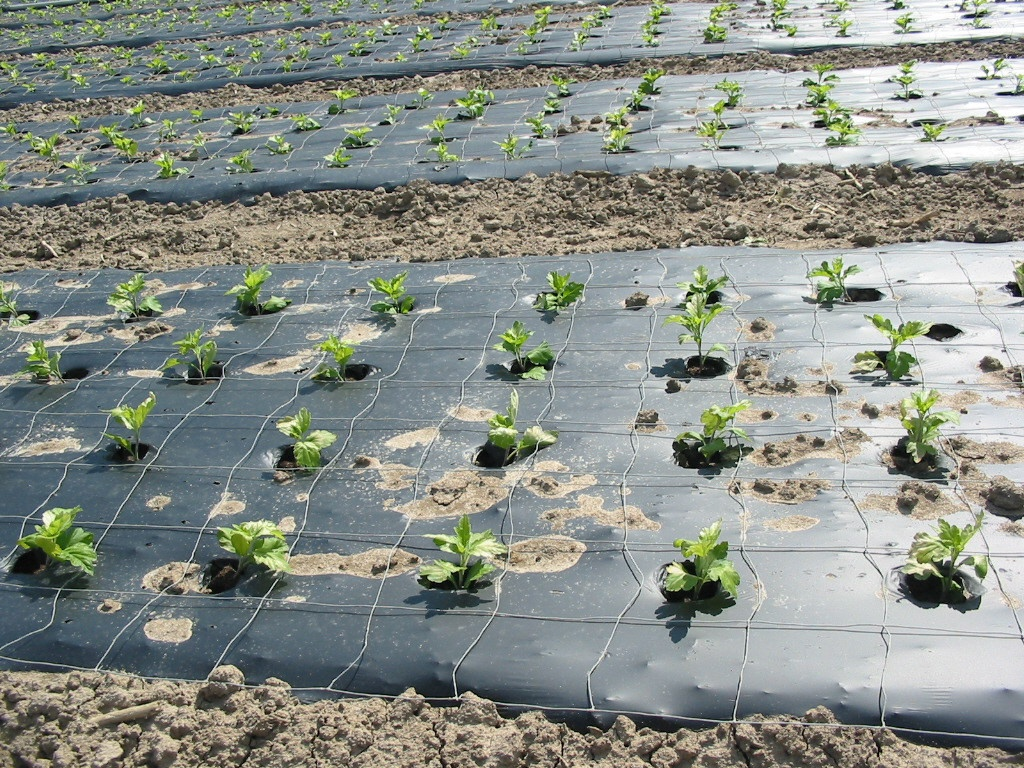
Mulch film made of polylactic acid (PLA)-blend bio-flex

Polylactic acid (PLA) is a transparent plastic produced from maize or dextrose. Superficially, it is similar to conventional petrochemical-based mass plastics like PS. It is derived from plants, and it biodegrades under industrial composting conditions. Unfortunately, it exhibits inferior impact strength, thermal robustness, and barrier properties (blocking air transport across the membrane) compared to non-biodegradable plastics. PLA and PLA blends generally come in the form of granulates. PLA is used on a limited scale for the production of films, fibers, plastic containers, cups, and bottles. PLA is also the most common type of plastic filament used for home fused deposition modeling in 3D printers.

==== Poly-3-hydroxybutyrate ====
The biopolymer poly-3-hydroxybutyrate (PHB) is a polyester produced by certain bacteria processing glucose, corn starch or wastewater. Its characteristics are similar to those of the petroplastic polypropylene (PP). PHB production is increasing. The South American sugar industry, for example, has decided to expand PHB production to an industrial scale. PHB is distinguished primarily by its physical characteristics. It can be processed into a transparent film with a melting point higher than 130 degrees Celsius, and is biodegradable without residue.

=== Polyhydroxyalkanoates ===
Polyhydroxyalkanoates (PHA) are linear polyesters produced in nature by bacterial fermentation of sugar or lipids. They are produced by the bacteria to store carbon and energy. In industrial production, the polyester is extracted and purified from the bacteria by optimizing the conditions for the fermentation of sugar. More than 150 different monomers can be combined within this family to give materials with extremely different properties. PHA is more ductile and less elastic than other plastics, and it is also biodegradable. These plastics are being widely used in the medical industry.

=== Polyamide 11 ===
PA 11 is a biopolymer derived from natural oil. It is also known under the tradename Rilsan B, commercialized by Arkema. PA 11 belongs to the technical polymers family and is not biodegradable. Its properties are similar to those of PA 12, although emissions of greenhouse gases and consumption of nonrenewable resources are reduced during its production. Its thermal resistance is also superior to that of PA 12. It is used in high-performance applications like automotive fuel lines, pneumatic airbrake tubing, electrical cable antitermite sheathing, flexible oil and gas pipes, control fluid umbilicals, sports shoes, electronic device components, and catheters.

A similar plastic is Polyamide 410 (PA 410), derived 70% from castor oil, under the trade name EcoPaXX, commercialized by DSM. PA 410 is a high-performance polyamide that combines the benefits of a high melting point (approx. 250 °C), low moisture absorption and excellent resistance to various chemical substances.

=== Bio-derived polyethylene ===
The basic building block (monomer) of polyethylene is ethylene. Ethylene is chemically similar to, and can be derived from ethanol, which can be produced by fermentation of agricultural feedstocks such as sugar cane or corn. Bio-derived polyethylene is chemically and physically identical to traditional polyethylene – it does not biodegrade but can be recycled. The Brazilian chemicals group Braskem claims that using its method of producing polyethylene from sugar cane ethanol captures (removes from the environment) 2.15 tonnes of CO_{2} per tonne of Green Polyethylene produced.

=== Genetically modified feedstocks ===
With GM corn being a common feedstock, it is unsurprising that some bioplastics are made from this.

Under the bioplastics manufacturing technologies there is the "plant factory" model, which uses genetically modified crops or genetically modified bacteria to optimize efficiency.

=== Polyhydroxyurethanes ===
The condensation of polyamines and cyclic carbonates produces polyhydroxyurethanes. Unlike traditional cross-linked polyurethanes, cross-linked polyhydroxyurethanes are in principle amenable to recycling and reprocessing through dynamic transcarbamoylation reactions.

=== Lipid-derived polymers ===
A number of bioplastic classes have been synthesized from plant- and animal-derived fats and oils. Polyurethanes, polyesters, epoxy resins and a number of other types of polymers have been developed with comparable properties to crude-oil-based materials. The recent development of olefin metathesis has opened a wide variety of feedstocks to economical conversion into biomonomers and polymers. With the growing production of traditional vegetable oils as well as low-cost microalgae-derived oils, there is significant potential for growth in this area.

In 2024, Lamanna et al. introduced oleogels based on ethyl cellulose and vegetable oils as a novel bioplastic named OleoPlast. This bioplastic exhibits thermoplastic behavior, offering both recyclability and biodegradability. The key advantages of OleoPlast include the ability to customize its mechanical and physical properties, as well as its compatibility with different processing techniques, such as injection molding, hot pressing, extrusion, and fused filament fabrication.

== Environmental impact ==
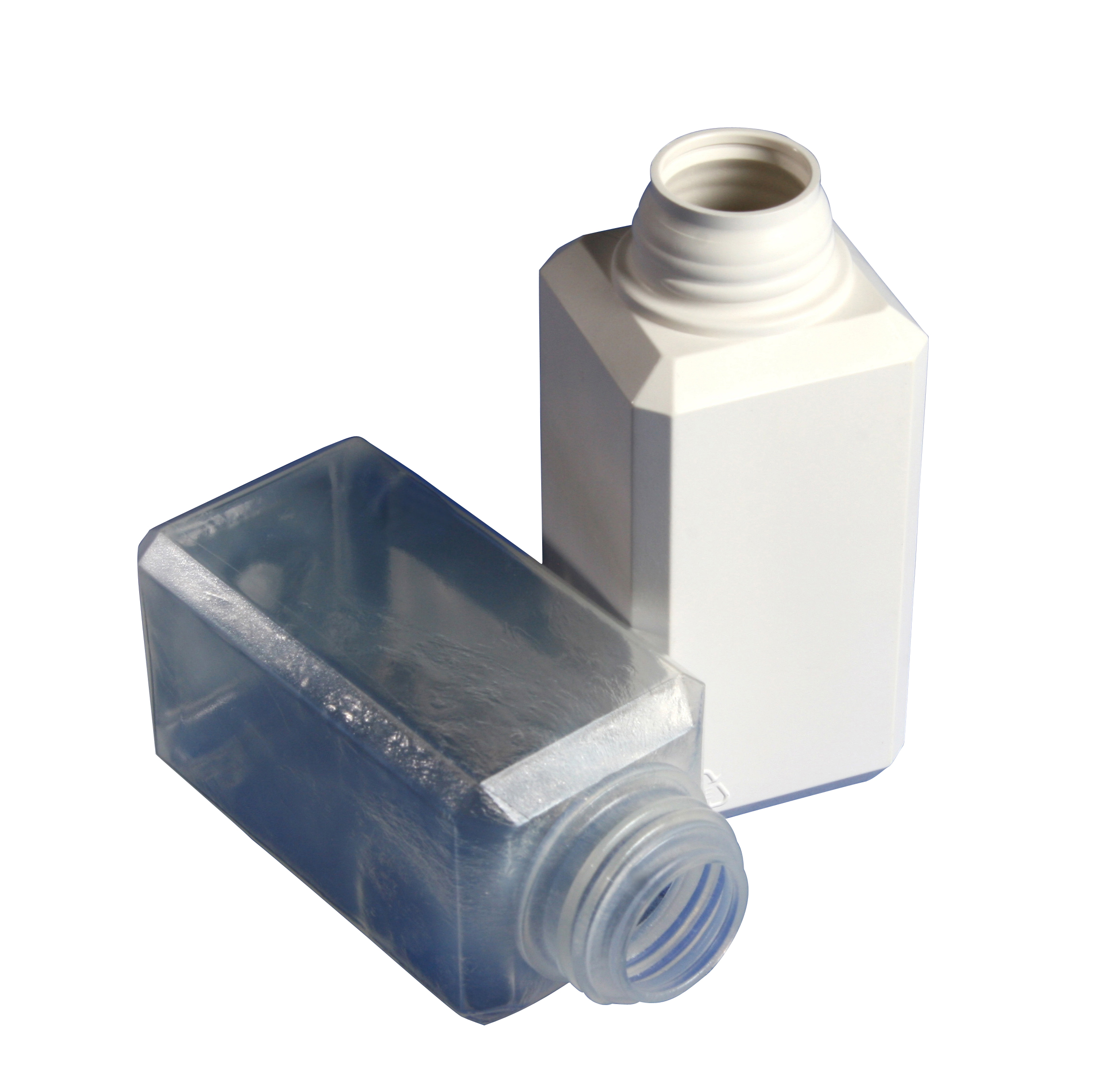
Bottles made from cellulose acetate biograde

Materials such as starch, cellulose, wood, sugar and biomass are used as a substitute for fossil fuel resources to produce bioplastics; this makes the production of bioplastics a more sustainable activity compared to conventional plastic production. The environmental impact of bioplastics is often debated, as there are many different metrics for "greenness" (e.g., water use, energy use, deforestation, biodegradation, etc.). Hence bioplastic environmental impacts are categorized into nonrenewable energy use, climate change, eutrophication and acidification. Bioplastic production significantly reduces greenhouse gas emissions and decreases non-renewable energy consumption. Firms worldwide would also be able to increase the environmental sustainability of their products by using bioplastics.

Although bioplastics save more nonrenewable energy than conventional plastics and emit less greenhouse gasses compared to conventional plastics, bioplastics also have negative environmental impacts such as eutrophication and acidification. Bioplastics induce higher eutrophication potentials than conventional plastics. Biomass production during industrial farming practices causes nitrate and phosphate to filtrate into water bodies; this causes eutrophication, the process in which a body of water gains excessive richness of nutrients. Eutrophication is a threat to water resources around the world since it causes harmful algal blooms that create oxygen dead zones, killing aquatic animals. Bioplastics also increase acidification. The high increase in eutrophication and acidification caused by bioplastics is also caused by using chemical fertilizer in the cultivation of renewable raw materials to produce bioplastics.

Other environmental impacts of bioplastics include exerting lower human and terrestrial ecotoxicity and carcinogenic potentials compared to conventional plastics. However, bioplastics exert higher aquatic ecotoxicity than conventional materials. Bioplastics and other bio-based materials increase stratospheric ozone depletion compared to conventional plastics; this is a result of nitrous oxide emissions during fertilizer application during industrial farming for biomass production. Artificial fertilizers increase nitrous oxide emissions especially when the crop does not need all the nitrogen. Minor environmental impacts of bioplastics include toxicity through using pesticides on the crops used to make bioplastics. Bioplastics also cause carbon dioxide emissions from harvesting vehicles. Other minor environmental impacts include high water consumption for biomass cultivation, soil erosion, soil carbon losses and loss of biodiversity, and they are mainly are a result of land use associated with bioplastics. Land use for bioplastics production leads to lost carbon sequestration and increases the carbon costs while diverting land from its existing uses

Although bioplastics are extremely advantageous because they reduce non-renewable consumption and GHG emissions, they also negatively affect the environment through land and water consumption, using pesticide and fertilizer, eutrophication and acidification; hence one's preference for either bioplastics or conventional plastics depends on what one considers the most important environmental impact.

Another issue with some bioplastics is that they are made from the edible parts of crops. This makes them compete with food production because the crops that produce bioplastics can also be used to feed people. These bioplastics are called "1st generation feedstock bioplastics". 2nd generation feedstock bioplastics use non-food crops (cellulosic feedstock) or waste materials from 1st generation feedstock (e.g. waste vegetable oil). Third generation feedstock bioplastics use algae as the feedstock.

=== Biodegradation of Bioplastics ===
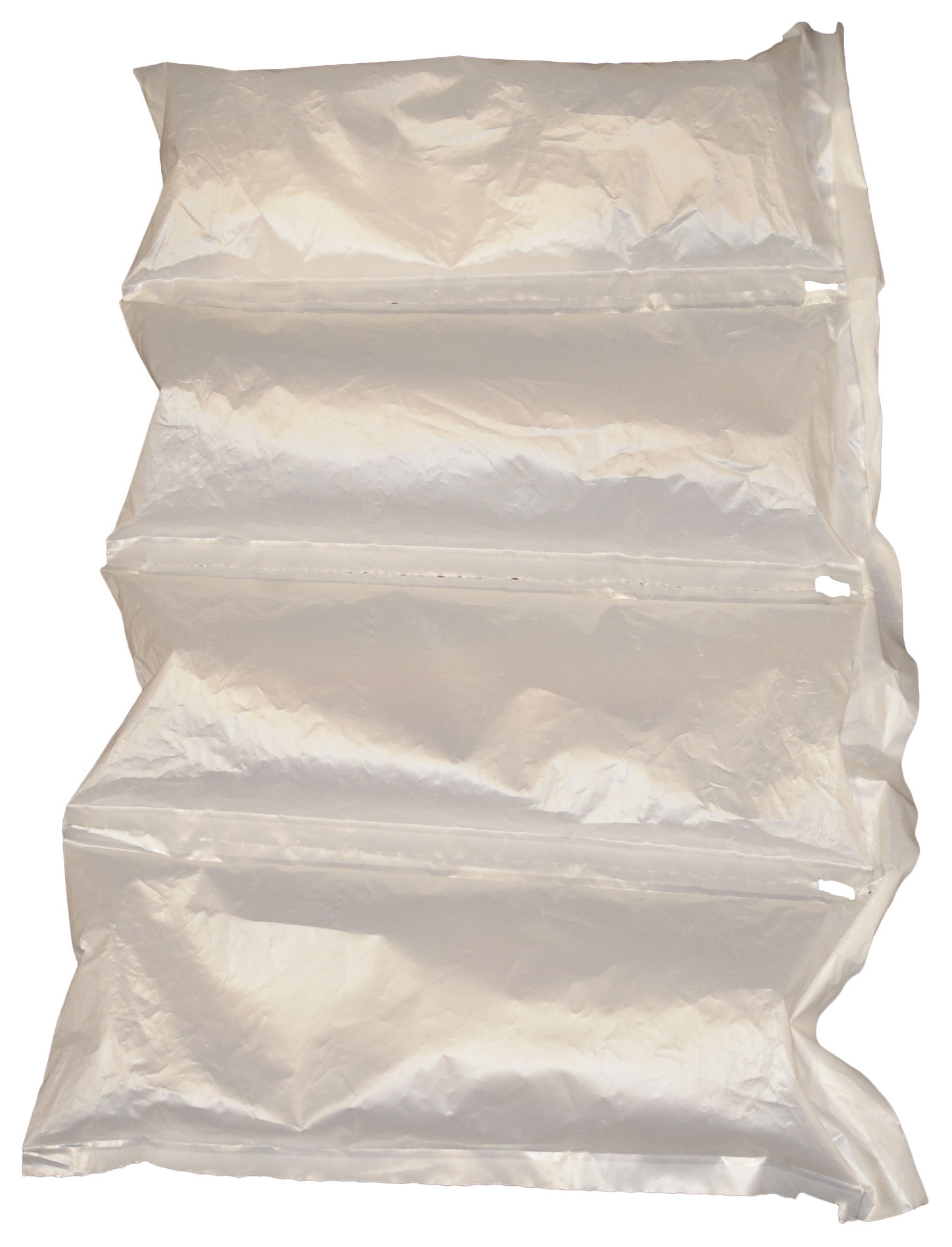
Packaging air pillow made of PLA-blend bio-flex

Biodegradation of any plastic is a process that happens at solid/liquid interface whereby the enzymes in the liquid phase depolymerize the solid phase. Certain types of bioplastics as well as conventional plastics containing additives are able to biodegrade. Bioplastics are more readily biodegradable in different conditions, as a result of being bio-based, hence they are more acceptable than conventional plastics for biodegradable plastics. Biodegradability of bioplastics occurs under various environmental conditions including soil, aquatic environments and compost. Both the structure and composition of biopolymer or bio-composite have an effect on the biodegradation process, hence changing the composition and structure might increase biodegradability. Soil and compost as environment conditions are more efficient in biodegradation due to their high microbial diversity. Composting not only biodegrades bioplastics efficiently but it also significantly reduces the emission of greenhouse gases. Biodegradability of bioplastics in compost environments can be upgraded by adding more soluble sugar and increasing temperature. Soil environments on the other hand have high diversity of microorganisms making it easier for biodegradation of bioplastics to occur. However, bioplastics in soil environments need higher temperatures and a longer time to biodegrade. Some bioplastics biodegrade more efficiently in water bodies and marine systems; however, this causes danger to marine ecosystems and freshwater. Hence it is accurate to conclude that biodegradation of bioplastics in water bodies which leads to the death of aquatic organisms and unhealthy water can be noted as one of the negative environmental impacts of bioplastics.

== Applications ==
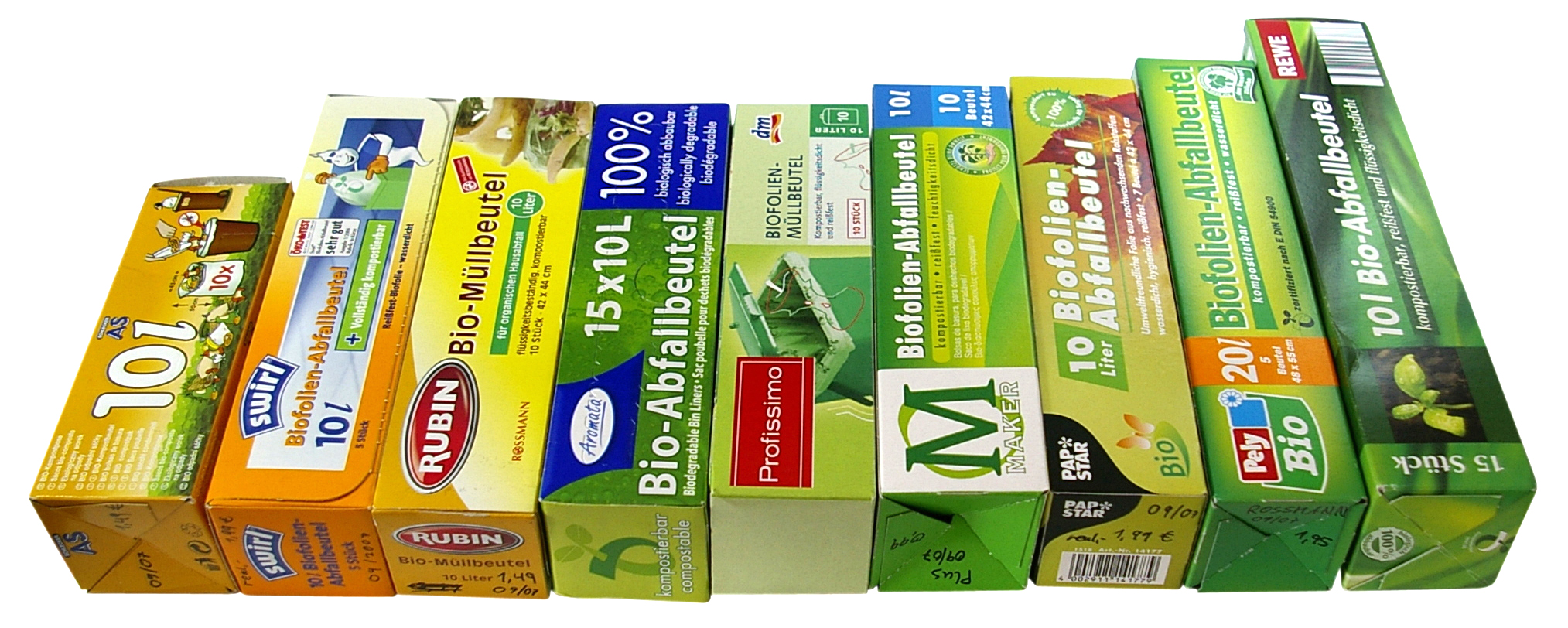
Boxed products made from bioplastics and other biodegradable plastics

Few commercial applications exist for bioplastics. Cost and performance remain problematic. Typical is the example of Italy, where biodegradable plastic bags are compulsory for shoppers since 2011 with the introduction of a specific law. Beyond structural materials, electroactive bioplastics are being developed that promise to carry electric current.

Bioplastics are used for disposable items, such as packaging, crockery, cutlery, pots, bowls, and straws.

Biopolymers are available as coatings for paper rather than the more common petrochemical coatings.

Drop-in bioplastics are chemically identical to their fossil-fuel counterparts but made from renewable resources. Examples include bio-PE, bio-PET, bio-propylene, bio-PP, and biobased nylons. Drop-in bioplastics are easy to implement technically, as existing infrastructure can be used. A dedicated bio-based pathway allows to produce products that cannot be obtained through traditional chemical reactions and can create products which have unique and superior properties, compared to fossil-based alternatives.

=== Bioplastics for construction materials ===
The concept of bioplastics dates back to the early 20th century. However, significant advancements occurred in the 1980s and 1990s when researchers began developing biodegradable plastics from natural sources. The construction industry started to take notice of bioplastics' potential in the late 2000s, due to the global push for greener building practices and the attractive benefits of bioplastics in construction, such as increased energy efficiency and biodegradeability.

In recent years, bioplastics have seen considerable advancements in terms of durability, cost-effectiveness, and performance. Innovations in biopolymer blends and composites have made bioplastics more suitable for construction applications, ranging from insulation to structural components.

=== Applications in construction ===
Insulation
Bioplastics can be used to create effective and eco-friendly insulation materials. Polylactic acid (PLA) and polyhydroxyalkanoates (PHA) are commonly used for this purpose due to their thermal properties and biodegradability.

Flooring
Bioplastic composites, such as those made from PLA and natural fibers, offer durable and sustainable alternatives to traditional flooring materials. They are particularly valued for their low carbon footprint and recyclability.

Panels and cladding
Bioplastic panels, made from blends of natural fibers and biopolymers, provide an eco-friendly option for wall cladding and partitioning. These materials are lightweight, durable, and can be designed to mimic traditional materials like wood or stone.

Formwork
Bioplastics are increasingly used in formwork for concrete casting. They offer advantages in terms of reusability, weight reduction, and reduced environmental impact compared to conventional materials.

Reinforcement
Bioplastic composites reinforced with natural fibers or other materials can be used in structural applications, offering a sustainable alternative to steel or fiberglass.

=== Challenges and limitations ===
Cost
Bioplastics are often more expensive to produce than traditional plastics, which can be a barrier to widespread adoption in the cost-sensitive construction industry. However, ongoing research and technological advancements are expected to reduce costs over time.

Performance
While bioplastics have made significant strides, some types still lag behind traditional materials in terms of strength, durability, and resistance to environmental factors like UV exposure and moisture.

Limited applications
Currently, bioplastics are suitable for a limited range of applications within construction. Expanding their use to more demanding structural roles will require further development and testing.

=== Future prospects ===
Continued research and innovation is likely to expand applications of bioplastics and improve their performance. As the construction industry increasingly embraces sustainability, bioplastics are growingly poised to play a role in the development of eco-friendly building materials.

Bioplastics offer a sustainable and versatile alternative to traditional construction materials, with significant environmental and economic benefits. While challenges remain, particularly in terms of cost and performance, the ongoing advancements in bioplastic technology hold the potential to transform the construction industry and contribute to a more sustainable future.

== Industry and markets ==
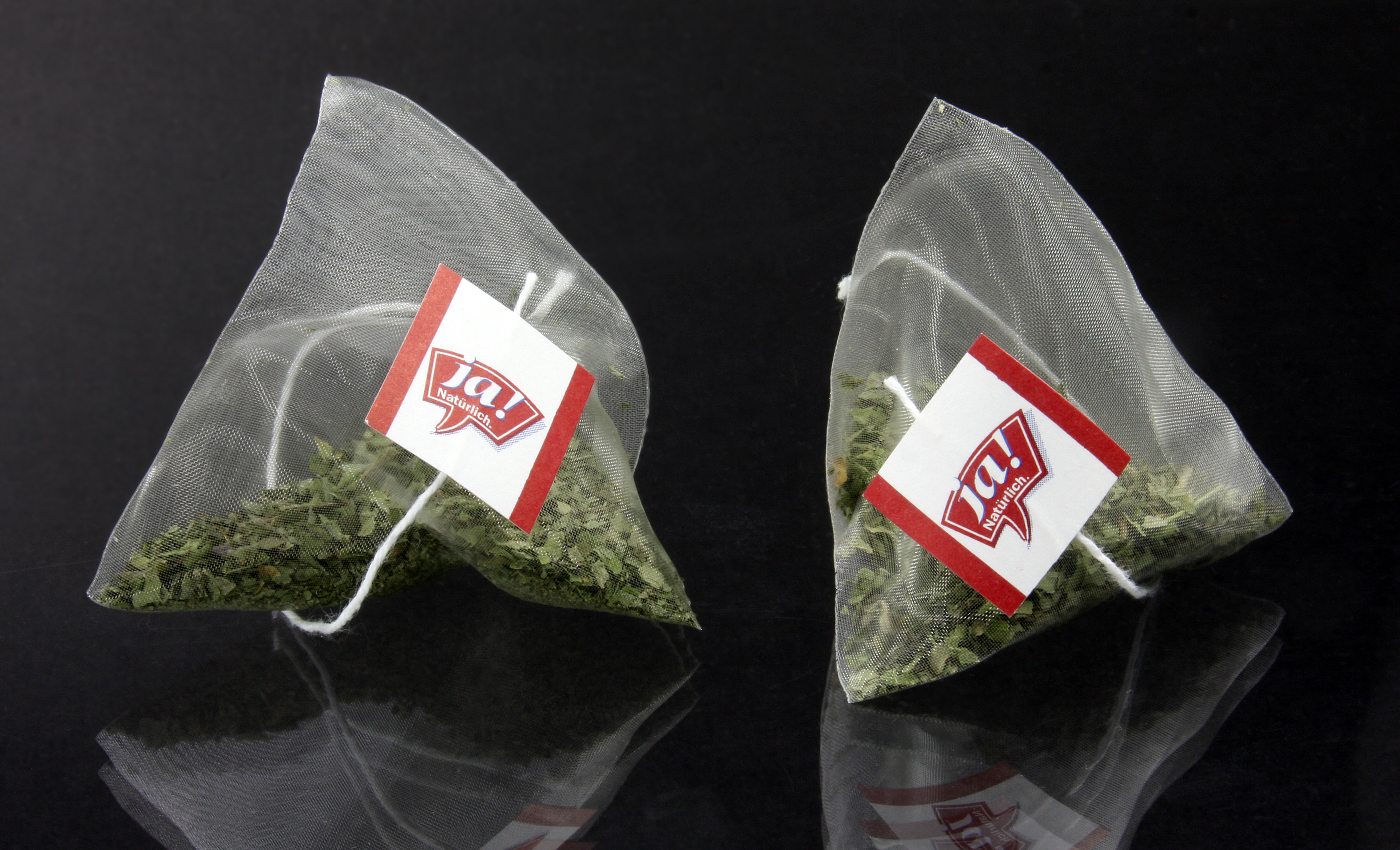
Tea bags made of polylactide (PLA) (peppermint tea)

While plastics based on organic materials were manufactured by chemical companies throughout the 20th century, the first company solely focused on bioplastics—Marlborough Biopolymers—was founded in 1983. However, Marlborough and other ventures that followed failed to find commercial success, with the first such company to secure long-term financial success being the Italian company Novamont, founded in 1989.

Bioplastics remain less than one percent of all plastics manufactured worldwide. Most bioplastics do not yet save more carbon emissions than are required to manufacture them. It is estimated that replacing 250 million tons of the plastic manufactured each year with bio-based plastics would require 100 million hectares of land, or 7 percent of the arable land on Earth. And when bioplastics reach the end of their life cycle, those designed to be compostable and marketed as biodegradable are often sent to landfills due to the lack of proper composting facilities or waste sorting, where they then release methane as they break down anaerobically.

COPA (Committee of Agricultural Organisation in the European Union) and COGEGA (General Committee for the Agricultural Cooperation in the European Union) have made an assessment of the potential of bioplastics in different sectors of the European economy:

Sector	Tonnes per year
Catering products	450,000
Organic waste bags	100,000
Biodegradable mulch foils	130,000
Biodegradable foils for diapers	80,000
Diapers, 100% biodegradable	240,000
Foil packaging	400,000
Vegetable packaging	400,000
Tyre components	200,000
Total:	2,000,000

The bioplastics market is expanding, driven by increasing demand for sustainable construction materials. This growth presents new economic opportunities for manufacturers and suppliers. The estimated market size for bioplastics in 2024 is 7.41 billion USD and is projected to grow upto 127.55 billion USD by 2025, with the largest share being produced by the European economy.

== History and development of bioplastics ==
- 1855: First (inferior) version of linoleum produced
- 1862: At the Great London Exhibition, Alexander Parkes displays Parkesine, the first thermoplastic. Parkesine is made from nitrocellulose and had very good properties, but exhibits extreme flammability. (White 1998)
- 1897: Still produced today, Galalith is a milk-based bioplastic that was created by German chemists in 1897. Galalith is primarily found in buttons. (Thielen 2014)
- 1907: Leo Baekeland invented Bakelite, which received the National Historic Chemical Landmark for its non-conductivity and heat-resistant properties. It is used in radio and telephone casings, kitchenware, firearms and many more products. (Pathak, Sneha, Mathew 2014)
- 1912: Brandenberger invents Cellophane out of wood, cotton, or hemp cellulose. (Thielen 2014)
- 1920s: Wallace Carothers finds Polylactic Acid (PLA) plastic. PLA is incredibly expensive to produce and is not mass-produced until 1989. (Whiteclouds 2018)
- 1925: Polyhydroxybutyrate was isolated and characterised by French microbiologist Maurice Lemoigne
- 1926: Maurice Lemoigne invents polyhydroxybutyrate (PHB) which is the first bioplastic made from bacteria. (Thielen 2014)
- 1930s: The first bioplastic car was made from soy beans by Henry Ford. (Thielen 2014)
- 1940-1945: During World War II, an increase in plastic production is seen as it is used in many wartime materials. Due to government funding and oversight the United States production of plastics (in general, not just bioplastics) tripled during 1940-1945 (Rogers 2005). The 1942 U.S. government short film The Tree in a Test Tube illustrates the major role bioplastics played in the World War II victory effort and the American economy of the time.
- 1950s: Amylomaize (>50% amylose content corn) was successfully bred and commercial bioplastics applications started to be explored. (Liu, Moult, Long, 2009) A decline in bioplastic development is seen due to the cheap oil prices, however the development of synthetic plastics continues.
- 1970s: The environmental movement spurred more development in bioplastics. (Rogers 2005)
- 1983: The first bioplastics company, Marlborough Biopolymers, is started which uses a bacteria-based bioplastic called biopal. (Feder 1985)
- 1989: The further development of PLA is made by Dr. Patrick R. Gruber when he figures out how to create PLA from corn. (Whiteclouds 2018). The leading bioplastic company is created called Novamount. Novamount uses matter-bi, a bioplastic, in multiple different applications. (Novamount 2018)
- Late 1990s: The development of TP starch and BIOPLAST from research and production of the company BIOTEC lead to the BIOFLEX film. BIOFLEX film can be classified as blown film extrusion, flat film extrusion, and injection moulding lines. These three classifications have applications as follows: Blown films - sacks, bags, trash bags, mulch foils, hygiene products, diaper films, air bubble films, protective clothing, gloves, double rib bags, labels, barrier ribbons; Flat films - trays, flower pots, freezer products and packaging, cups, pharmaceutical packaging; Injection moulding - disposable cutlery, cans, containers, performed pieces, CD trays, cemetery articles, golf tees, toys, writing materials. (Lorcks 1998)
- 1992: It is reported in Science that PHB can be produced by the plant Arabidopsis thaliana. (Poirier, Dennis, Klomparens, Nawrath, Somerville 1992)
- 2001: Metabolix inc. purchases Monsanto's biopol business (originally Zeneca) which uses plants to produce bioplastics. (Barber and Fisher 2001)
- 2001: Nick Tucker uses elephant grass as a bioplastic base to make plastic car parts. (Tucker 2001)
- 2005: Cargill and Dow Chemicals is rebranded as NatureWorks and becomes the leading PLA producer. (Pennisi 2016)
- 2007: Metabolix inc. market tests its first 100% biodegradable plastic called Mirel, made from corn sugar fermentation and genetically engineered bacteria. (Digregorio 2009)
- 2012: A bioplastic is developed from seaweed proving to be one of the most environmentally friendly bioplastics based on research published in the journal of pharmacy research. (Rajendran, Puppala, Sneha, Angeeleena, Rajam 2012)
- 2013: A patent is put on bioplastic derived from blood and a crosslinking agent like sugars, proteins, etc. (iridoid derivatives, diimidates, diones, carbodiimides, acrylamides, dimethylsuberimidates, aldehydes, Factor XIII, dihomo bifunctional NHS esters, carbonyldiimide, glyoxyls [sic], proanthocyanidin, reuterin). This invention can be applied by using the bioplastic as tissue, cartilage, tendons, ligaments, bones, and being used in stem cell delivery. (Campbell, Burgess, Weiss, Smith 2013)
- 2014: It is found in a study published in 2014 that bioplastics can be made from blending vegetable waste (parsley and spinach stems, the husks from cocoa, the hulls of rice, etc.) with TFA solutions of pure cellulose creates a bioplastic. (Bayer, Guzman-Puyol, Heredia-Guerrero, Ceseracciu, Pignatelli, Ruffilli, Cingolani, and Athanassiou 2014)
- 2016: An experiment finds that a car bumper that passes regulation can be made from nano-cellulose based bioplastic biomaterials using banana peels. (Hossain, Ibrahim, Aleissa 2016)
- 2017: A new proposal for bioplastics made from Lignocellulosics resources (dry plant matter). (Brodin, Malin, Vallejos, Opedal, Area, Chinga-Carrasco 2017)
- 2018: Many developments occur including Ikea starting industrial production of bioplastics furniture (Barret 2018), Project Effective focusing on replacing nylon with bio-nylon (Barret 2018), and the first packaging made from fruit (Barret 2018).
- 2019: Five different types of Chitin nanomaterials were extracted and synthesized by the 'Korea Research Institute of Chemical Technology' to verify strong personality and antibacterial effects. When buried underground, 100% biodegradation was possible within six months.

*This is not a comprehensive list. These inventions show the versatility of bioplastics and important breakthroughs. New applications and bioplastics inventions continue to occur.

Year	Bioplastic Discovery or Development
1862	Parkesine - Alexander Parkes
1868	Celluloid - John Wesley Hyatt
1897	Galalith - German chemists
1907	Bakelite - Leo Baekeland
1912	Cellophane - Jacques E. Brandenberger
1920s	Polylactic Acid (PLA) - Wallace Carothers
1926	Polyhydroxybutyrate (PHB) - Maurice Lemoigne
1930s	Soy bean-based bioplastic car - Henry Ford
1983	Biopal - Marlborough Biopolymers
1989	PLA from corn - Dr. Patrick R. Gruber; Matter-bi - Novamount
1992	PHB can be produced by Arabidopsis thaliana (a small flowering plant)
1998	Bioflex film (blown, flat, injection molding) leads to many different applications of bioplastic
2001	PHB can be produced by elephant grass
2007	Mirel (100% biodegradable plastic) by Metabolic inc. is market tested
2012	Bioplastic is developed from seaweed
2013	Bioplastic made from blood and a cross-linking agent which is used in medical procedures
2014	Bioplastic made from vegetable waste
2016	Car bumper made from banana peel bioplastic
2017	Bioplastics made from lignocellulosic resources (dry plant matter)
2018	Bioplastic furniture, bio-nylon, packaging from fruit

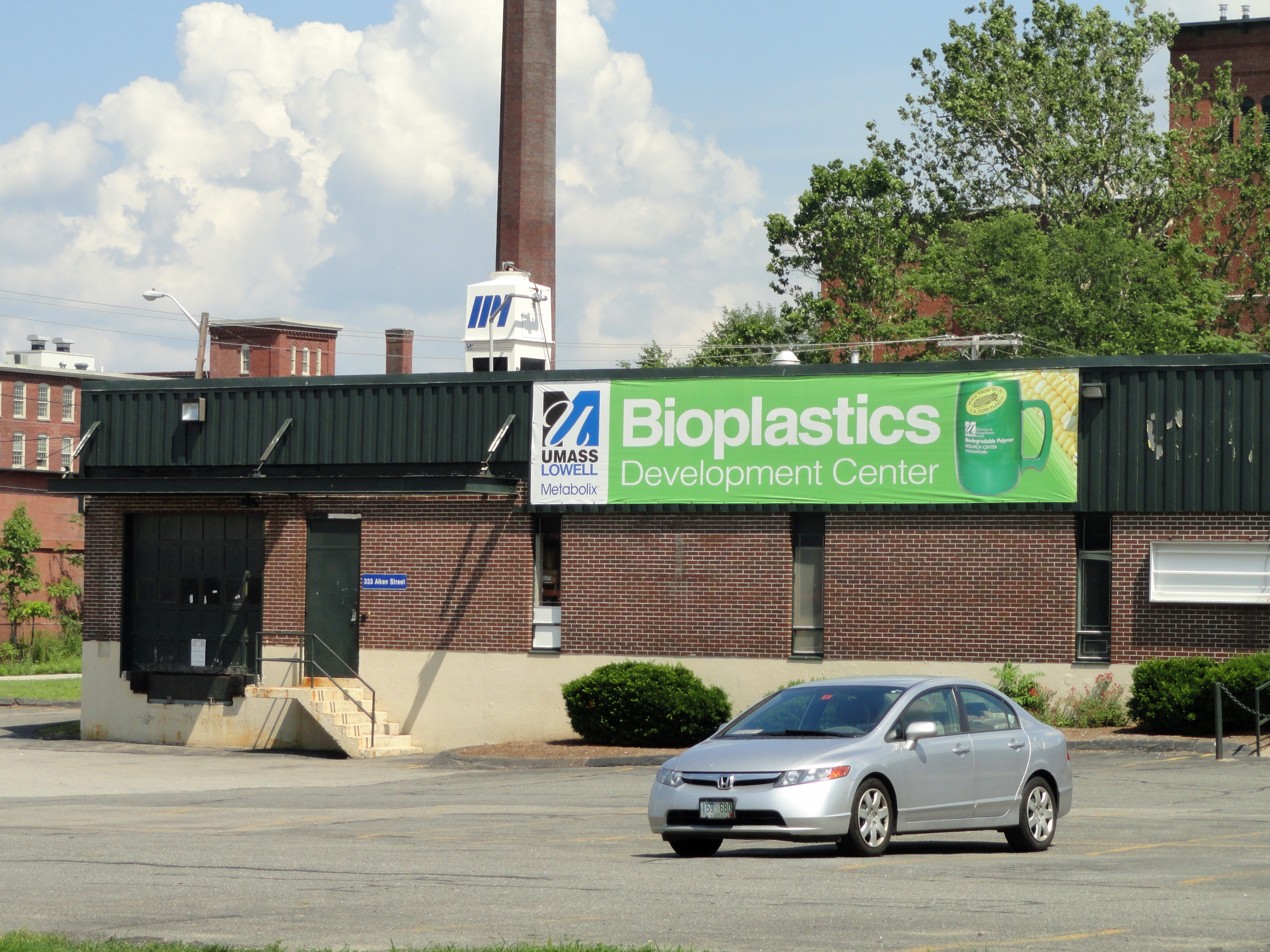
Bioplastics Development Center - University of Massachusetts Lowell

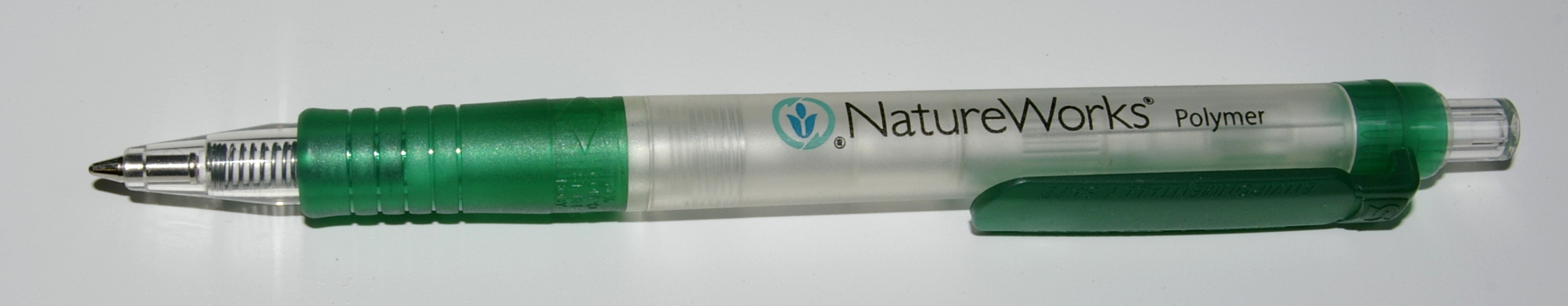
A pen made with bioplastics (Polylactide, PLA)

== Testing procedures ==
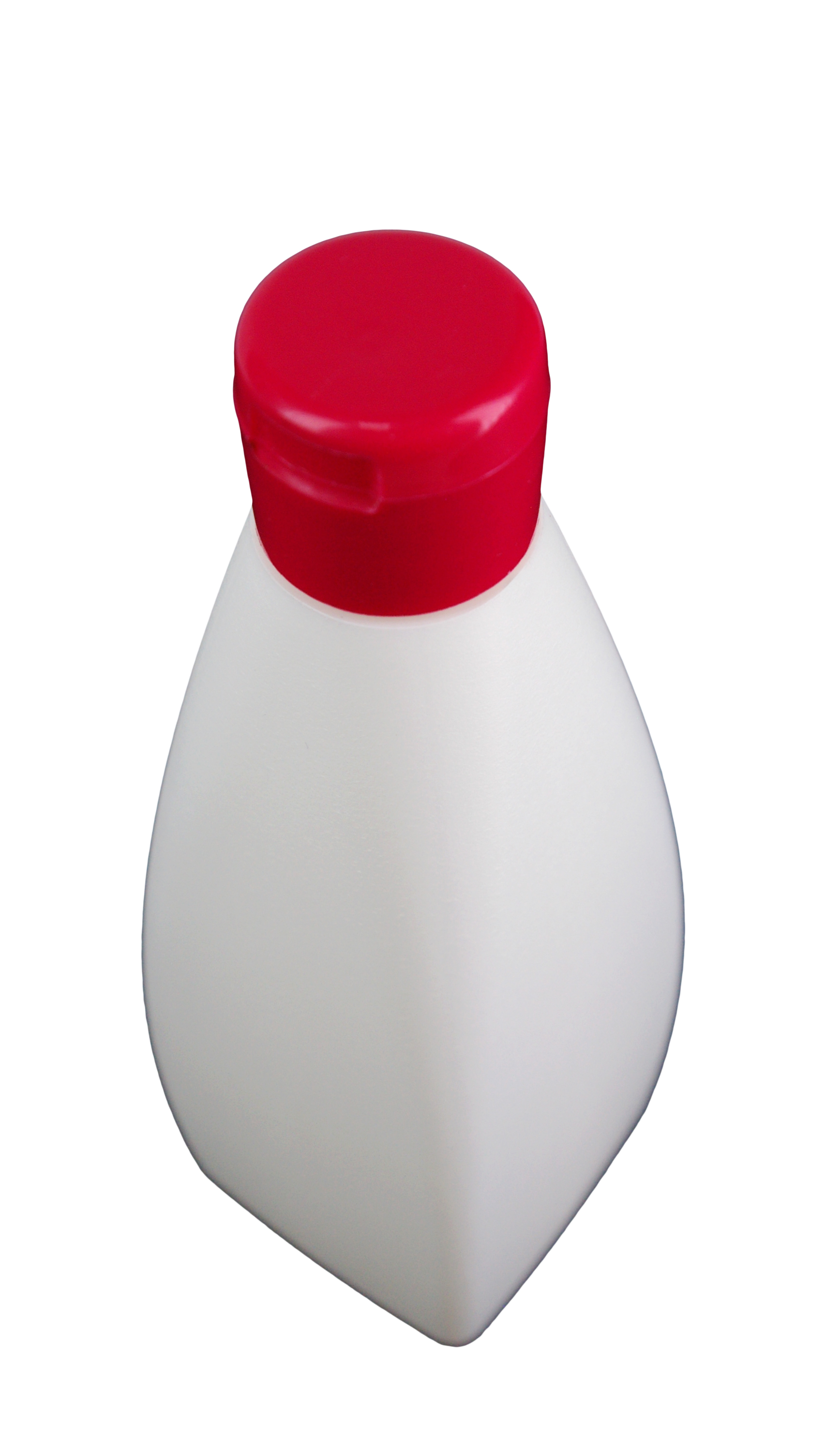
A bioplastic shampoo bottle made of PLA-blend bio-flex

=== Industrial compostability – EN 13432, ASTM D6400 ===
The EN 13432 industrial standard must be met in order to claim that a plastic product is compostable in the European marketplace. In summary, it requires multiple tests and sets pass/fail criteria, including disintegration (physical and visual break down) of the finished item within 12 weeks, biodegradation (conversion of organic carbon into CO_{2}) of polymeric ingredients within 180 days, plant toxicity and heavy metals. The ASTM 6400 standard is the regulatory framework for the United States and has similar requirements.

Many starch-based plastics, PLA-based plastics and certain aliphatic-aromatic co-polyester compounds, such as succinates and adipates, have obtained these certificates. Additive-based bioplastics sold as photodegradable or Oxo Biodegradable do not comply with these standards in their current form.

=== Compostability – ASTM D6002 ===
The ASTM D 6002 method for determining the compostability of a plastic defined the word compostable as follows:

that which is capable of undergoing biological decomposition in a compost site such that the material is not visually distinguishable and breaks down into carbon dioxide, water, inorganic compounds and biomass at a rate consistent with known compostable materials.

This definition drew much criticism because, contrary to the way the word is traditionally defined, it completely divorces the process of "composting" from the necessity of it leading to humus/compost as the end product. The only criterion this standard does describe is that a compostable plastic must look to be going away as fast as something else one has already established to be compostable under the traditional definition.

==== Withdrawal of ASTM D 6002 ====
In January 2011, the ASTM withdrew standard ASTM D 6002, which had provided plastic manufacturers with the legal credibility to label a plastic as compostable. Its description is as follows:

This guide covered suggested criteria, procedures, and a general approach to establish the compostability of environmentally degradable plastics.

The ASTM has yet to replace this standard.

=== Biobased – ASTM D6866 ===
The ASTM D6866 method has been developed to certify the biologically derived content of bioplastics. Cosmic rays colliding with the atmosphere mean that some of the carbon is the radioactive isotope carbon-14. CO_{2} from the atmosphere is used by plants in photosynthesis, so new plant material will contain both carbon-14 and carbon-12. Under the right conditions, and over geological timescales, the remains of living organisms can be transformed into fossil fuels. After ~100,000 years all the carbon-14 present in the original organic material will have undergone radioactive decay leaving only carbon-12. A product made from biomass will have a relatively high level of carbon-14, while a product made from petrochemicals will have no carbon-14. The percentage of renewable carbon in a material (solid or liquid) can be measured with an accelerator mass spectrometer.

There is an important difference between biodegradability and biobased content. A bioplastic such as high-density polyethylene (HDPE) can be 100% biobased (i.e. contain 100% renewable carbon), yet be non-biodegradable. These bioplastics such as HDPE nonetheless play an important role in greenhouse gas abatement, particularly when they are combusted for energy production. The biobased component of these bioplastics is considered carbon-neutral since their origin is from biomass.

=== Anaerobic biodegradability – ASTM D5511-02 and ASTM D5526 ===
The ASTM D5511-12 and ASTM D5526-12 are testing methods that comply with international standards such as the ISO DIS 15985 for the biodegradability of plastic.

== See also ==
- Alkane
- Biofuel
- BioSphere Plastic
- Celluloid
- Cutlery
- Edible tableware
- Food vs. fuel
- Galalith
- Health concerns regarding plastic food packaging
- Organic photovoltaics
- Plastivores
- Plastic bans
- Sustainable packaging
