= Sphaerisporangium rubeum =

Scientific classification
- Domain: Bacteria
- Kingdom: Bacillati
- Phylum: Actinomycetota
- Class: Actinomycetes
- Order: Streptosporangiales
- Family: Streptosporangiaceae
- Genus: Sphaerisporangium
- Species: S. rubeum

Binomial name
- Sphaerisporangium rubeum Ara and Kudo, 2007, emend. Cao et al., 2009

Species of bacterium

Sphaerisporangium rubeum is an actinomycete species of bacteria first isolated from sandy soil. It produces branching substrate mycelia and spherical spore vesicles on aerial hyphae that contain non-motile spores. They also contained diaminopimelic acid and the N-acetyl type of peptidoglycan. Its type strain is 3D-72(35)^{T} (=JCM 13067^{T} =DSM 44936^{T}).
