= Sphaerisporangium cinnabarinum =

Scientific classification
- Domain: Bacteria
- Kingdom: Bacillati
- Phylum: Actinomycetota
- Class: Actinomycetes
- Order: Streptosporangiales
- Family: Streptosporangiaceae
- Genus: Sphaerisporangium
- Species: S. cinnabarinum

Binomial name
- Sphaerisporangium cinnabarinum Ara and Kudo, 2007, emend. Cao et al., 2009

Species of bacterium

Sphaerisporangium cinnabarinum is an actinomycete species of bacteria first isolated from sandy soil. It produces branching substrate mycelia and spherical spore vesicles on aerial hyphae that contain non-motile spores. They also contained diaminopimelic acid and the N-acetyl type of peptidoglycan. Its type strain is JCM 3291 (=DSM 44094).
