= Microbispora corallina =

Scientific classification
- Domain: Bacteria
- Kingdom: Bacillati
- Phylum: Actinomycetota
- Class: Actinomycetia
- Order: Streptosporangiales
- Family: Streptosporangiaceae
- Genus: Microbispora
- Species: M. corallina

Binomial name
- Microbispora corallina Nakajima et al. 1999

Species of bacterium

Microbispora corallina is a bacterium with type strain DF-32^{T} (= JCM 10267^{T}). Its name comes from its microscopic appearance resembling coral due to spores on the tips of short sporophores branched from aerial hyphae.
