= Planomonospora =

Scientific classification
- Domain: Bacteria
- Kingdom: Bacillati
- Phylum: Actinomycetota
- Class: Actinomycetes
- Order: Streptosporangiales
- Family: Streptosporangiaceae
- Genus: Planomonospora; Thiemann, Pagani & Beretta 1967

Type species
- Planomonospora parontospora Thiemann, Pagani & Beretta 1967

Species
- P. alba; P. algeriensis; P. corallina; P. parontospora; P. sphaerica; P. venezuelensis

Genus of bacteria

Planomonospora is a genus in the phylum Actinomycetota (Bacteria).

== Etymology ==
The name Planomonospora is derived from ancient Greek. Planos meaning wanderer or vagabond, monos meaning solitary, single and spora meaning a seed, or in biological context a spore. The name therefore describes a motile organism with a single endospore.

== Phylogeny ==
The currently accepted taxonomy is based on the List of Prokaryotic names with Standing in Nomenclature (LPSN) and National Center for Biotechnology Information (NCBI).

16S rRNA based LTP_10_2024

- - - Planomonospora venezuelensis Thiemann 1967
    - Planobispora
  - - - Planomonospora
        - - P. algeriensis Chaabane Chaouch et al. 2017
          - P. corallina Suriyachadkun, Ngaemthao & Chunhametha 2016
        - - P. parontospora Thiemann, Pagani & Beretta 1967
          - P. sphaerica Mertz 1994
    - - Planomonospora alba Mertz 1994
      - Streptosporangium Mertz 1994

120 marker proteins based GTDB 10-RS226

- - - - Planomonospora
        - P. alba
        - P. parontospora [incl. P. sphaerica, P. algeriensis]
    - - Planomonospora venezuelensis
      - Planobispora
  - Streptosporangium

== See also ==
- List of bacterial orders
- List of bacteria genera
