= Acrocarpospora =

Scientific classification
- Domain: Bacteria
- Kingdom: Bacillati
- Phylum: Actinomycetota
- Class: Actinomycetes
- Order: Streptosporangiales
- Family: Streptosporangiaceae
- Genus: Acrocarpospora; Tamura, Suzuki & Hatano 2000

Type species
- Acrocarpospora pleiomorpha Tamura, Suzuki & Hatano 2000

Species
- A. catenulata; A. corrugata; A. macrocephala; A. phusangensis; A. pleiomorpha; "A. punica"

Genus of bacteria

Acrocarpospora is a genus of bacteria in the phylum Actinomycetota. The major respiratory quinone is menaquinone MK-9(H(4)) and use madurose, an actinomycete whole-cell sugar.

== Etymology ==
The name Acrocarpospora derives from:
Greek adjective akros, uttermost, topmost, highest, at the top, end; Greek noun karpos, fruit; Greek feminine gender noun spora, a seed, and in biology a spore; Neo-Latin feminine gender noun Acrocarpospora, an organism forming spores like fruits on the terminal mycelium.

- A. corrugata (Williams and Sharples 1976) Tamura et al. 2000; Latin feminine gender participle adjective corrugata, ridged (spores).
- A. macrocephala Tamura et al. 2000; Greek adjective makrokephalos, long-headed; Neo-Latin feminine gender noun macrocephala, large head.
- A. pleiomorpha Tamura et al. 2000, (Type species of the genus).; Greek adjective pleios, full; Greek noun morphē, form, shape; Neo-Latin feminine gender adjective pleiomorpha, pleiomorphic, in various shapes.

== Phylogeny ==
The currently accepted taxonomy is based on the List of Prokaryotic names with Standing in Nomenclature (LPSN) and National Center for Biotechnology Information (NCBI).

16S rRNA based LTP_10_2024

- Acrocarpospora
  - A. corrugata (Williams & Sharples 1976) Tamura, Suzuki & Hatano 2000
  - - - A. macrocephala Tamura, Suzuki & Hatano 2000
      - A. pleiomorpha Tamura, Suzuki & Hatano 2000
    - - A. catenulata Liu et al. 2022
      - - A. phusangensis Niemhom et al. 2013
        - Herbidospora soli Niemhom & Thawai 2018

120 marker proteins based GTDB 10-RS226

- Acrocarpospora
  - A. catenulata
  - - A. phusangensis
    - - A. corrugata
      - - A. macrocephala
        - A. pleiomorpha

== See also ==
- List of bacterial orders
- List of bacteria genera
