= Polybutylene succinate =

Biodegradable polymer

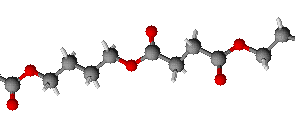

Names
- Other names Poly(tetramethylene succinate)

Identifiers
CAS Number	26247-20-1
Abbreviations	PBS
CompTox Dashboard (EPA)	DTXSID50275024

Properties
Chemical formula	(C_{8}H_{12}O_{4})_{n}
Density	1.26 g/cm^{3}
Melting point	115 °C (239 °F; 388 K)
Solubility in water	Insoluble
Solubility in chloroform	Soluble

Related compounds
Related Monomers	Succinic acid Butanediol
- Except where otherwise noted, data are given for materials in their standard state (at 25 °C [77 °F], 100 kPa). Infobox references

Polybutylene succinate (PBS) (sometimes written polytetramethylene succinate) is a thermoplastic polymer resin of the polyester family. PBS is a biodegradable aliphatic polyester with properties that are comparable to polypropylene.

It may also be referred to by the brand names GsPLA or BioPBS (Mitsubishi Chemical). PBS consists of polymerized units of butylene succinate, with repeating C_{8}H_{12}O_{4} units.

== History ==
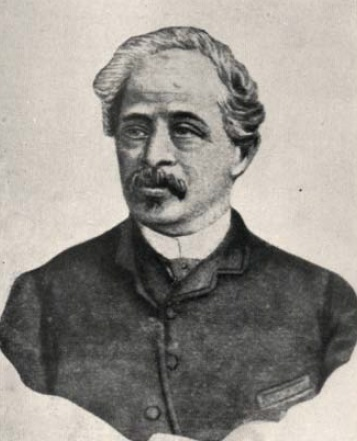
A. V. Lourenço

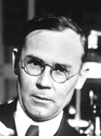
W. H. Carothers

The synthesis of succinic acid based polyesters was first performed in 1863. In that time the Portuguese professor Agostinho Vicente Lourenço described in his "Recherche sur les composés polyatomiques" (Research on polyatomic compounds), the reaction between succinic acid and ethylene glycol to form what he named "succino-ethylenic acid". He noticed that this acid was losing water when it was heated at high temperatures (300 °C) and that a crystalline mass when obtained after cooling. Unfortunately, Lourenço did not study much the structure of the material he obtained.

Later Davidoff (1886), and then Voländer (1894) prepared this same material by using different methods. This early work was pursued in the 1930s by Wallace Carothers (E.I. du Pont de Nemours and Co.), with a more systematic study of succinic acid based polyesters. In that time the purpose of such study was to find a synthetic alternative to natural silk fiber.

Carothers, by eliminating water in a continuous distillation process, obtained polymers with molar masses significantly higher than what was previously synthesized. Nevertheless, the properties of the final products did not show the expected qualities. Thus Carothers put more attention on polyamides and invented with his colleague Julian Hill Nylon 6,6.

Later Flory (1946) proposed an improved synthesis of aliphatic polyesters with diacid chloride.

In the beginning of the 1990s, after being forgotten for more than 40 years, these polymers received a renewed interest due to the increasing demand on biodegradable and bio-based polymers.

== Synthesis ==
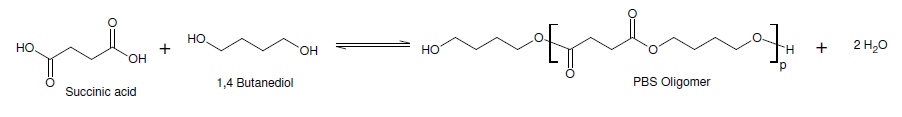
Like other polyesters such as polyethylene terephthalate, two main routes exist for the synthesis of PBS: the trans-esterification process (from succinate diesters) and the direct esterification process starting from the diacid. The direct esterification of succinic acid with 1,4-butanediol is the most common way to produce PBS. It consists of a two step process. First, an excess of the diol is esterified with the diacid to form PBS oligomers with elimination of water.

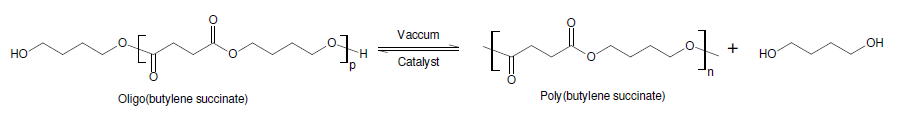
Then, these oligomers are trans-esterified under vacuum to form a high molar mass polymer. This step requires an appropriate catalyst such as titanium, zirconium, tin or germanium derivatives.

== Biodegradability ==
Amycolatopsis (sp. HT-6), Penicillium (sp. strain 14-3), Bacillus, Thermopolyspora and Aspergillus versicolor can degrade PBS. From the last four mentioned, Aspergillus versicolor was found to be the best PBS-degrading microorganism. Microbispora rosea, Excellospora japonica and E. viridilutea can consume samples of emulsified PBS.

The controlled biodegradation of PBS proceeds in three phases: first a slow phase, followed by an accelerated second phase, and last a leveling-off phase. The efficiency of biodegradation is affected by the size and shape of the materials as well. PBS degrades better as a powder or film compared to pellets, as a result of the larger available surface.

== Applications ==
As PBS decomposes into water and CO_{2} through naturally occurring degrading enzymes and microorganisms, it may be a biodegradable alternative to some common plastics. The scope of PBS application fields is still growing and several areas can be identified but it remains difficult to know precisely in which specific object PBS is actually used. First in the packaging field, PBS could be processed into films, bags, or boxes, for both food and cosmetic packagings. Other applications of PBS could be found as disposable products such as tableware or medical articles. In agriculture, PBS finds interest in the fabrication of mulching films or delayed release materials for pesticide and fertilizer. PBS is also promise to find market shares in fishery (for fishing nets), forestry, civil engineering or other fields in which recovery and recycling of materials after use is problematic. In the medical field, PBS could be used as biodegradable drug encapsulation systems, and is also investigated for implants.

== Industrial production ==
In industry, the improvement of the PBS synthesis allowed the large scale production of this polymer. The Japanese company Showa High Polymer, built in 1993 a semi-commercial plant able to produce 3,000 tons of polymer per year. Sold under the tradename Bionolle, these polyesters are synthesized via melt condensation polymerization followed by a chain-extension with a diisocyanate. Much later, in April 2003, Mitsubishi Chemicals built a 3,000 tons/year capacity and launched to the market a PBS named GS Pla (Green and Sustainable Plastic). This polymer has high molar masses without the use of a chain extender. Since then, several PBS producers such as Hexing Chemical (Anhui, China), Xinfu Pharmaceutical (Hangzhou, China) or IRe Chemical (South Korea) appeared on the market. In 2010 Hexing Chemical became China's first large-scale PBS enterprise, with the annual capacity of 10,000 tons. The same year Xinfu Pharmaceutical announced the building up of the world's largest continuous PBS production line with an annual capacity of 20,000 tons. At the moment most of these polyalkylene succinates are synthesized from petrochemical precursors. Nevertheless most of the producers are evaluating or developing bio-based succinic acid for the synthesis of these polyesters. In 2016, Showa Denko announced termination of the production and sale of Bionolle, citing delay in permeation of environmental regulations on plastic shopping bags and a fall in market prices of biodegradable plastics.
