= Sphaerisporangium =

Scientific classification
- Domain: Bacteria
- Kingdom: Bacillati
- Phylum: Actinomycetota
- Class: Actinomycetes
- Order: Streptosporangiales
- Family: Streptosporangiaceae
- Genus: Sphaerisporangium corrig. Ara and Kudo 2007

Type species
- Sphaerisporangium melleum corrig. Ara & Kudo 2007

Species
- See text

Synonyms
- Sphaerosporangium (sic)

Genus of bacteria

Sphaerisporangium is a Gram-positive genus of bacteria from the family Streptosporangiaceae.

== Phylogeny ==
The currently accepted taxonomy is based on the List of Prokaryotic names with Standing in Nomenclature (LPSN) and National Center for Biotechnology Information (NCBI).

16S rRNA based LTP_10_2024

- Sphaerisporangium
  - - S. melleum corrig. Ara & Kudo 2007
    - - S. fuscum Guo et al. 2024
      - - S. krabiense Suriyachadkun et al. 2011
        - S. siamense Duangmal et al. 2012
  - - - S. flaviroseum Cao et al. 2009
      - S. viridialbum corrig. (Nonomura & Ohara 1960) Ara & Kudo 2007
    - - - S. perillae Wang et al. 2023
        - - S. aureirubrum Guo et al. 2015
          - S. rubeum corrig. Ara & Kudo 2007
      - - - S. album Cao et al. 2009
          - S. rufum Mingma et al. 2014
        - - S. cinnabarinum corrig. Ara & Kudo 2007
          - - S. dianthi Xing et al. 2018
            - S. rhizosphaerae Mu et al. 2018

120 marker proteins based GTDB 10-RS226

- Sphaerisporangium
  - S. rubeum
  - - - S. fuscum
      - S. rufum
    - - - S. album
        - - S. krabiense
          - S. siamense
      - - S. melleum
        - - S. perillae
          - - "S. corydalis" Wang et al. 2015
            - S. flaviroseum

== See also ==
- List of bacterial orders
- List of bacteria genera
