= Microbispora =

Scientific classification
- Domain: Bacteria
- Kingdom: Bacillati
- Phylum: Actinomycetota
- Class: Actinomycetes
- Order: Streptosporangiales
- Family: Streptosporangiaceae
- Genus: Microbispora; Nonomura and Ohara 1957

Type species
- Microbispora rosea Nonomura & Ohara 1957

Species
- See text

Synonyms
- "Waksmania" Lechevalier & Lechevalier 1957

Genus of bacteria

Microbispora is a Gram-positive, mesophilic, thermophilic and non-motile bacterial genus from the family Streptosporangiaceae.

== Phylogeny ==
The currently accepted taxonomy is based on the List of Prokaryotic names with Standing in Nomenclature (LPSN) and National Center for Biotechnology Information (NCBI).

16S rRNA based LTP_10_2024

- Microbispora
  - - M. oryzae Muangham & Duangmal 2022
    - - M. aerata (Gerber & Lechevalier 1964) Cross 1974
      - M. corallina Nakajima et al. 1999
  - - - - M. catharanthi Klykleung et al. 2020
        - M. triticiradicis Han et al. 2018
      - - M. siamensis Boondaeng et al. 2009
        - - M. hainanensis Xu et al. 2012
          - M. soli Kittisrisopit et al. 2018
    - - M. sitophila
      - - M. clausenae Kaewkla et al. 2020
        - - M. fusca Zhao et al. 2020
          - - M. bryophytorum Li et al. 2015
            - - M. rosea Nonomura & Ohara 1957
              - M. camponoti Han et al. 2016

120 marker proteins based GTDB 10-RS226

- Microbispora
  - M. oryzae
  - - M. corallina
    - - - M. amethystogenes Nonomura & Ohara 1960
        - M. triticiradicis [incl. M. fusca]
      - - M. aerata
        - - - M. catharanthi
            - M. siamensis [incl. M. sitophila]
          - - M. hainanensis
            - - M. bryophytorum [incl. M. camponoti]
              - M. rosea

Species incertae sedis:

- "M. griseoalba" Hu & Chen 1987
- M. maris Xie et al. 2024
- "M. rhizosphaerae" Bunbamrung et al. 2021

== See also ==
- List of bacterial orders
- List of bacteria genera
