= Soybean car =

1941 American concept car made from plant-derived plastic

World's first plastic car body

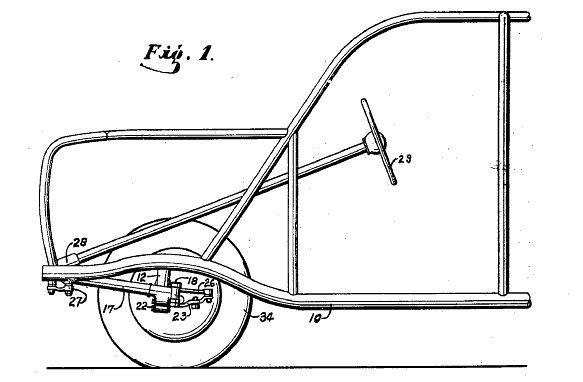
Plastic car frame patent 2,269,452 (January 13, 1942)

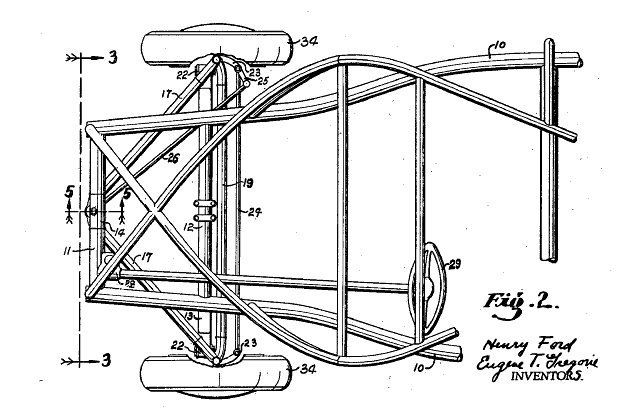
Soybean car frame patent, Fig. 2

The soybean car was a concept car built with agricultural plastic. The New York Times in 1941 states the car body and fenders were made from a strong material derived from soy beans, wheat and corn. (Note: "The first plastic car was manufactured by the Ford Motor Company, Dearborn, Mich., USA, in August 1941. Fourteen plastic panels were mounted on a tubular welded frame.") One article claims that they were made from a chemical formula that, among many other ingredients, included soy beans, wheat, hemp, flax and ramie; while the man who was instrumental in creating the car, Lowell E. Overly, claims it was "…soybean fiber in a phenolic resin with formaldehyde used in the impregnation" (Davis, 51). The body was lighter and therefore more fuel efficient than a normal metal body. It was made in Dearborn, Michigan and was introduced to public view on August 13, 1941. It was made, in part, as a hedge against the rationing of steel during World War II. It was designed to run on hemp fuel.

== History ==
Henry Ford enlisted famous inventor George Washington Carver for development then put Eugene Turenne Gregorie of his design department in charge of manufacturing. Ultimately he was not satisfied with the proposed project, and gave the project to the Soybean Laboratory in Greenfield Village. The person in charge there was Lowell Overly, who had a background in tool and die design. The finished prototype was exhibited in 1941 at the Dearborn Days festival in Dearborn, Michigan. It was also shown at the Michigan State Fair Grounds the same year.

Because of World War II all US automobile production was curtailed considerably, and the plastic car experiment basically came to a halt. By the end of the war the plastic car idea went into oblivion. According to Lowell Overly, the prototype car was destroyed by Bob Gregorie.

Others argue that Ford invested millions of dollars into research to develop the plastic car to no avail. He proclaimed he would "grow automobiles from the soil" — however it never happened, even though he had over 12,000 acres (4,900 ha) of soybeans for experimentation. Some sources even say the Soybean Car wasn't made from soybeans at all — but of phenolic plastic, an extract of coal tar. One newspaper even reports that all of Ford's research only provided whipped cream as a final product.

== Reasoning for a plastic car ==
The Henry Ford Museum gives three reasons for Ford's decision to make a plastic automobile, the plastic car made from soybeans.

1. Ford was looking to integrate industry with agriculture;
2. Ford claimed that his plastic made these cars safer than normal metal cars;
3. Ford wished to make his new plastic material a replacement for the metals used in normal cars. A side benefit would have been easing of the shortage of metal during World War II.

== Car ingredients ==
The frame of this automobile was made of tubular steel, to which were attached some fourteen plastic panels, (Note: "Fourteen plastic panels were mounted on a tubular welded frame.") said to be "only a quarter of an inch (6 mm) thick." The windows were made of acrylic sheets. All of this led to a reduction in weight from 2,500 pounds (1,134 kg) for a typical car to 1,900 pounds (862 kg), a reduction in weight of about 25 percent.

The exact ingredients of the plastic are not known since there were no records kept of the plastic itself. Speculation is that it was a combination of soybeans, wheat, hemp, flax and ramie. Lowell Overly, the person who had the most influence in creating the car, says it was "...soybean fiber in a phenolic resin with formaldehyde used in the impregnation."

== Internet video ==
A report circulating on the Internet shows a film from 1941 about the plastic car in the opening credits, stated as being the plastic soybean car, but at the end it shows images of Henry Ford striking a hammer or axe onto a trunk lid. It is not the soybean car he is hitting, but Ford's personal car with a plastic panel of the same material on the trunk, and the hammer had a rubber boot placed on the sharp end of the axe. When Jack Thompson, the narrator of the 1941 black and white film, stated in the introduction that this was the Soybean Car being shown he did not make it clear that the trunk Henry Ford was hitting with the tool at the end of the film was actually Ford's personal car made of the same plastic material—not the Soybean Car itself. Henry Ford was doing this demonstration to show the toughness of the plastic material. The demonstration was dramatic, since the tool rebounded with much force and a picture of this was shown worldwide.

== See also ==
- Bioplastic
- Trabant, another early car with an all-plastic body.
