= Renewable polyethylene =

Renewable plastic

Biopolyethylene (also known as renewable polyethylene) is polyethylene made out of ethanol, which becomes ethylene after a dehydration process. It can be made from various feedstocks including sugar cane, sugar beet, and wheat grain.

The final product is indistinguishable from conventional polyethylene (except by radiocarbon dating), and thus is recyclable in the same chain established for conventional PE.

== History ==
In 2007 an ethanol-based manufacturing plant, totally integrated from sugarcane to polyethylene, was announced by the Dow Chemical Company, in conjunction with Crystalsev, a large sugar and ethanol producer in Brazil. The plant was projected to produce 350 000 metric tonnes per year of renewable LLDPE (linear low-density polyethylene), would begin construction in 2008, and was slated to start production in 2011.

== Benefits ==
One of the main environmental benefits of Green PE is the sequestration of roughly 2.15 tonnes of CO_{2} per tonne of Green Polyethylene produced, which comes from the CO_{2} absorbed by the sugar cane while growing, minus the CO_{2} emitted through the production process. Renewable polyethylene is non-biodegradable and can be recycled in the same waste streams as traditional polyethylenes (HDPE, LDPE, LLDPE) as it is chemically identical.

== Disadvantages ==
Producing feedstock for biobased plastics relies upon intensive agriculture, potentially contributing to deforestation in order to clear land for agricultural use. Large-scale production of feedstock also requires inputs such as fossil fuels, fertilizers, and pesticides.

== Production ==
Braskem is the world leader in the production of biopolymer, with the Green Polyethylene "I'm green™", a thermoplastic resin produced from ethylene made from sugarcane ethanol, a 100% renewable raw material which helps reduce greenhouse gas emissions. The production started in 2010 and is located in Triunfo, Brazil.

Today the Braskem industrial unit has an annual production capacity of 200 000 tonne of Green Polyethylene. Green PE has the same properties, performance, and application versatility as fossil-based polyethylene, which makes it a drop-in replacement in the plastic production chain. For these same reasons, it is also recyclable in the same recycling chain used by traditional polyethylene. Because it is part of the portfolio of high-density polyethylene (HDPE) and linear low-density polyethylene (LLDPE) products, Green PE rapidly became an option for applications in rigid and flexible packaging, closures, bags, and other products. In January 2014, the family of low-density polyethylene (LDPE) was added to the product portfolio, effectively covering additional applications in packaging and films.
