= Thermopolyspora =

Scientific classification
- Domain: Bacteria
- Kingdom: Bacillati
- Phylum: Actinomycetota
- Class: Actinomycetes
- Order: Streptosporangiales
- Family: Streptosporangiaceae
- Genus: Thermopolyspora; Cross & Goodfellow 1973 ex Goodfellow, Maldonado & Quintana 2005 non Henssen 1957
- Species: T. flexuosa

Binomial name
- Thermopolyspora flexuosa (Krasil'nikov & Agre 1964 ex Meyer 1989) Goodfellow, Maldonado & Quintana 2005

Synonyms
- "Acetomadura" Krasil'nikov & Agre 1964

Genus of bacteria

Thermopolyspora is a Gram-positive bacterial genus from the family of Streptosporangiaceae. It currently contains a single species, Thermopolyspora flexuosa.
