= Streptosporangiaceae =

Scientific classification
- Domain: Bacteria
- Kingdom: Bacillati
- Phylum: Actinomycetota
- Class: Actinomycetes
- Order: Streptosporangiales
- Family: Streptosporangiaceae; Goodfellow et al. 1990

Genera
- See text

Family of bacteria

Streptosporangiaceae is a family of bacteria.

== Phylogeny ==
The currently accepted taxonomy is based on the List of Prokaryotic names with Standing in Nomenclature (LPSN) and National Center for Biotechnology Information (NCBI).

16S rRNA based LTP_10_2024

- Streptosporangiaceae s.s.
  - Bailinhaonella Feng et al. 2019
  - - Thermostaphylospora Wu et al. 2018
    - - Thermopolyspora Krassilnikov and Agre 1964 ex Goodfellow et al. 2005
      - - Sinosporangium Zhang et al. 2011 [incl. Rhizohabitans Yamada et al. 2023]
        - - - Thermoactinospora Zhou et al. 2012
            - - Spongiactinospora Li et al. 2019
              - - Sphaerisporangium corrig. Ara and Kudo
                  2007
                - - - Herbidospora Kudo et al. 1993
                    - - Herbidospora mongoliensis
                      - Acrocarpospora Tamura et al. 2000
                  - - Microtetraspora Thiemann et al. 1968
                    - - Planotetraspora phitsanulokensis
                      - - Planotetraspora Runmao et al. 1993
                        - - Sphaerimonospora Mingma et al. 2016
                          - Microbispora Nonomura and Ohara 1957
          - - Thermocatellispora Zhou et al. 2012
            - - - Nonomuraea~
                - - Planobispora Thiemann and Beretta 1968
                  - - Planomonospora Thiemann et al. 1967
                    - - Planomonospora alba
                      - Streptosporangium Couch 1955
              - Nonomuraea corrig. Zhang et al. 1998

120 marker proteins based GTDB 10-RS226

- Streptosporangiales Streptosporangiaceae s.l.
  - {Treboniaceae}
  - - - {Nocardiopsaceae}
      - {Thermomonosporaceae}
    - - {Streptosporangiaceae s.s.}
        - Bailinhaonella
        - - Rhizohabitans
          - - Thermopolyspora
            - - Sphaerisporangium
              - - - - Acrocarpospora
                    - Herbidospora
                  - - Microtetraspora
                    - - Planotetraspora
                      - - - Thermobispora Wang et al. 1996
                          - Sphaerimonospora
                        - Microbispora
                - - - Sinosporangium
                    - - Spongiactinospora
                      - - Thermocatellispora
                        - Thermostaphylospora
                  - - - - Planomonospora
                        - - Planomonospora venezuelensis
                          - Planobispora
                      - Streptosporangium
                    - Nonomuraea [incl. Thermoactinospora]

Genera incertae sedis:

- "Astrosporangium" Ntai, Phelan & Bachmann 2006
- "Clavisporangium" Nakajima, Kitpreechavanich & Kudo 2001
- Dolomitihabitans Robertson and Meyers 2026

== See also ==
- Bacterial taxonomy
- List of bacterial orders
- List of bacteria genera
