= C6H6 =

The molecular formula C_{6}H_{6} (molar mass: 78.114)

- Benzene
- Benzvalene
- Bicyclopropenyl
- 1,2,3-Cyclohexatriene
- Dewar benzene
- Fulvene
- Prismane
- [3]Radialene
- 3-Methylidenepent-1-en-4-yne
- Hexadiyne
  - 1,3-Hexadiyne
  - 1,4-Hexadiyne
  - 1,5-Hexadiyne
  - 2,4-Hexadiyne
- Hexadienyne
  - 1,2-Hexadien-4-yne
  - 1,2-Hexadien-5-yne
  - 1,3-Hexadien-5-yne
  - 1,5-Hexadien-3-yne (divinylacetylene)
  - 2,3-Hexadien-5-yne

Historical and hypothetical compounds:

- Claus' benzene
