= Adolf Karl Ludwig Claus =

German chemist (1838–1900)

- Born: 6 June 1838; Kassel, Electorate of Hesse
- Died: 4 May 1900 (aged 61); Horheim, German Empire (now part of Wutöschingen, Germany)
- Education: University of Göttingen
- Known for: Claus' benzene
- Scientific career
- Doctoral advisor: Friedrich Wöhler

Adolf Karl Ludwig Claus (6 June 1838 – 4 May 1900) was a German chemist. He is known for his structure of benzene proposed in 1867.

== Life ==
Claus was born in 1838 in Kassel, Germany. Starting from 1850, he studied medicine in Marburg and later chemistry at the University of Marburg, with Hermann Kolbe. After spending a short time at the University of Berlin, he worked with Friedrich Wöhler at the University of Göttingen. He received his PhD in 1862, and in the same year changed his position and started working at the University of Freiburg. He completed his habilitation in 1866 and became assistant professor in the following year. With the retirement of Lambert Heinrich von Babo, Claus succeeded him as full professor. He held that position until his retirement due to health problems in 1900. Clause died in Horheim near Wutöschingen in the same year.

== Work ==
The structure of benzene proposed by Claus.

Claus mostly worked in organic chemistry where his interests were very diverse and included alkaloids, aromatic substitution, oximes and theoretical considerations on the structure of organic molecules. Claus is best known for proposing a model of benzene molecule in 1867.

In his model, the six carbon atoms of benzene form a hexagon with a hydrogen atom attached to every corner. To preserve valence 4 for carbons, the opposite corners of the hexagon are connected by single bonds. It took years of research before the three postulated structures of benzene – by Albert Ladenburg (1869), August Kekulé 1865 and by Claus – found their place in organic chemistry. Ladenburg's prismane and Claus' benzene were both proven to be wrong. While the prismane was synthesized in 1973, calculations showed that the synthesis of Claus' benzene is impossible.

Claus synthesized and determined the structure of several isomers of oximes. He described the isomerism by differences in the bond structure of the molecules whereas several other scientists found it more convincing to describe the difference by the relatively new concept of stereochemistry. This scientific dispute lasted until his death in 1900.
