= Valence isomer =

Molecule interconvertable with another through pericyclic reactions

In organic chemistry, two molecules are valence isomers when they are constitutional isomers that can interconvert through pericyclic reactions.

== Benzene ==
There are many valence isomers one can draw for the C_{6}H_{6} formula benzene. Some were originally proposed for benzene itself before the actual structure of benzene was known. Others were later synthesized in lab. Some have been observed to isomerize to benzene, whereas others tend to undergo other reactions instead, or isomerize by ways other than pericyclic reactions.

Some known valence isomers of benzene

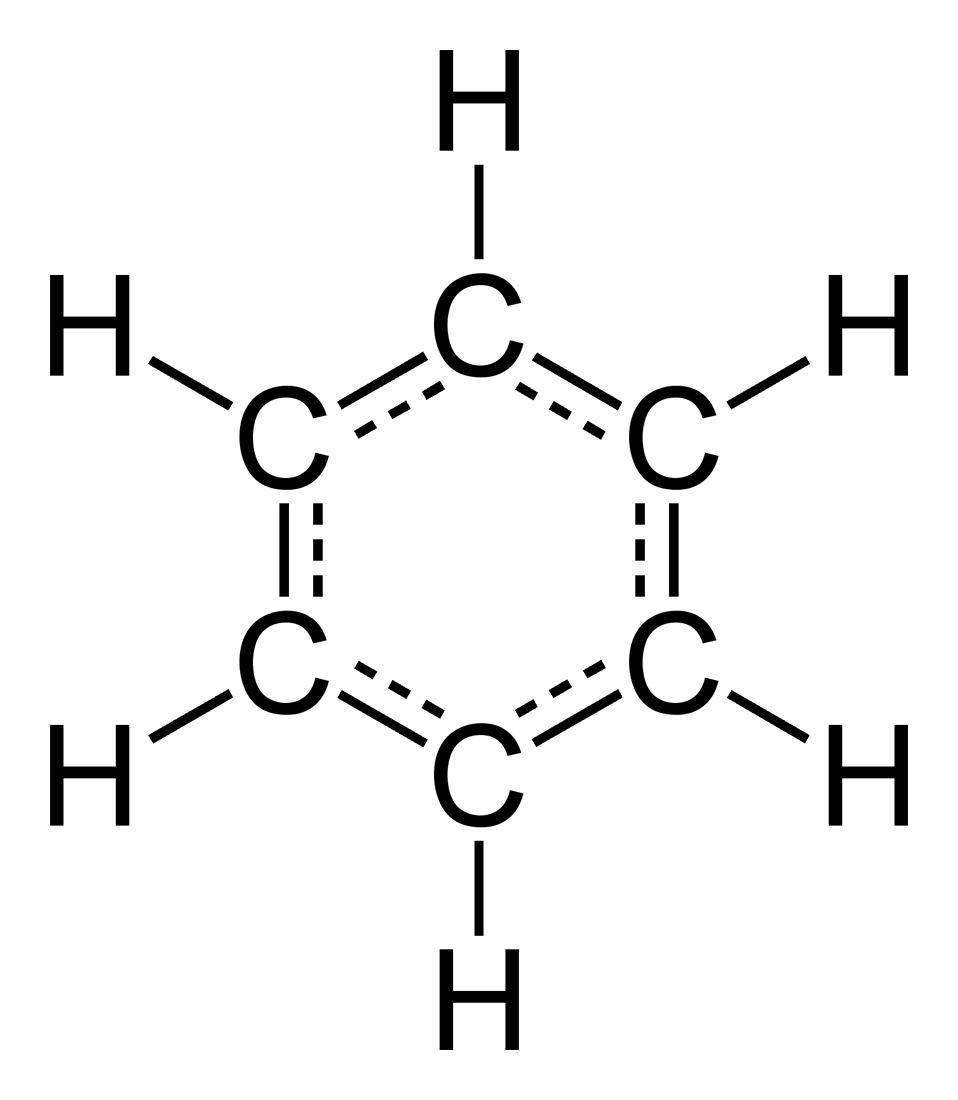
Benzene

Dewar benzene

Prismane

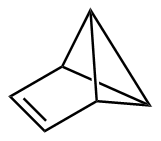
Benzvalene

Bicyclopropenyl

== Cyclooctatetraene ==
The valence isomers are not restricted to isomers of benzene. Valence isomers are also seen in the series (CH)_{8}. Due to the larger number of units, the number of possible valence isomers is also greater and at least 21:

Valence isomers of cyclooctatetraene

Cyclooctatetraene (COT)

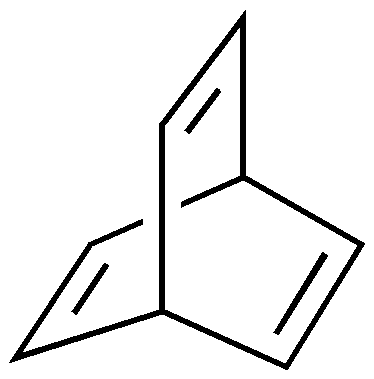
Barrelene

Cubane

Cuneane

Semibullvalene

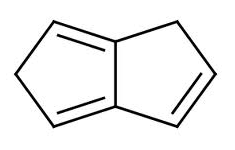
1,5-dihydropentalene

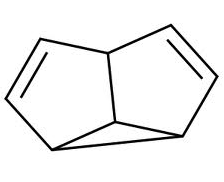
2a,2b,4a,4b-Tetrahydrocyclopropa[cd]pentalene

Bicyclo[4.2.0]octa-2,4,7-triene. Tautomer with COT by thermal 6e process or photochemical 4e process

Tricyclo[3,3,0,0^{2,6}]octa-3,8-diene. Isomerises to semibullvalene at room temperature, stable at −60 °C

Tricyclo[4,2,0,0^{2,5}]octa-3,7-diene. The dimer of cyclobutadiene occurs as a cis isomer and a trans isomer. Both isomers convert to COT (symmetry forbidden hence stable) with a half-life of 20 minutes at 140 °C

Tetracyclo[3,3,0,0^{2,4},0^{3,6}] octa-7-ene is only known as its 4-carbomethoxy derivative.

Tetracyclo[4,2,0,0^{2,4},0^{3,5}] octa-7-ene has been prepared from benzvalene and isomerises to COT

Pentacyclo[5.1.0.0^{2,4}. 0^{3,5}.0^{6,8}]octane (octabisvalene) is the third saturated valence isomer. The (Z)-3,7-phenylsulfonyl derivative is stable up to 200 °C.

Tricyclo[5.1.0.0^{2,8}]octa-3,5-diene (octavalene) was reported synthesised from homobenzvalene and converts to COT at 50 °C

== Naphthalene and azulene ==
Perhaps no pair of valence isomers differ more strongly in appearance than colourless naphthalene and the intensely violet azulene.

The valence isomers of naphthalene

Naphthalene

Azulene

== Benzene oxide and oxepin ==
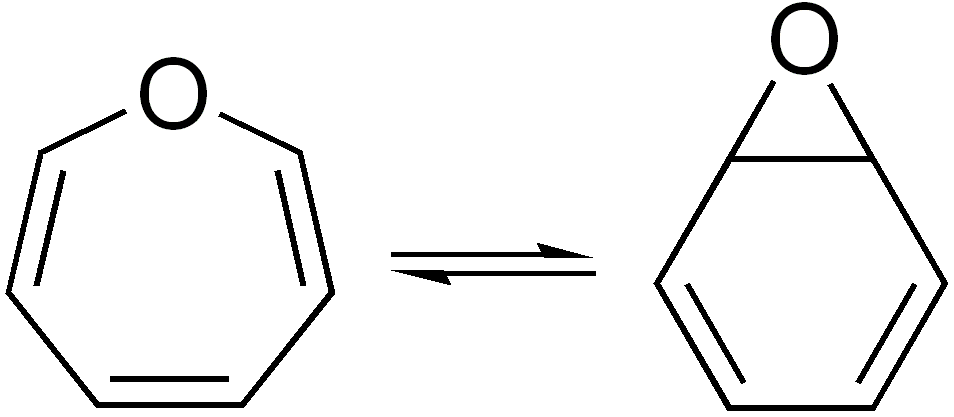
Benzene oxide exists in dynamic equilibrium with its valence isomer oxepin.
