= Bicyclopropenyl =

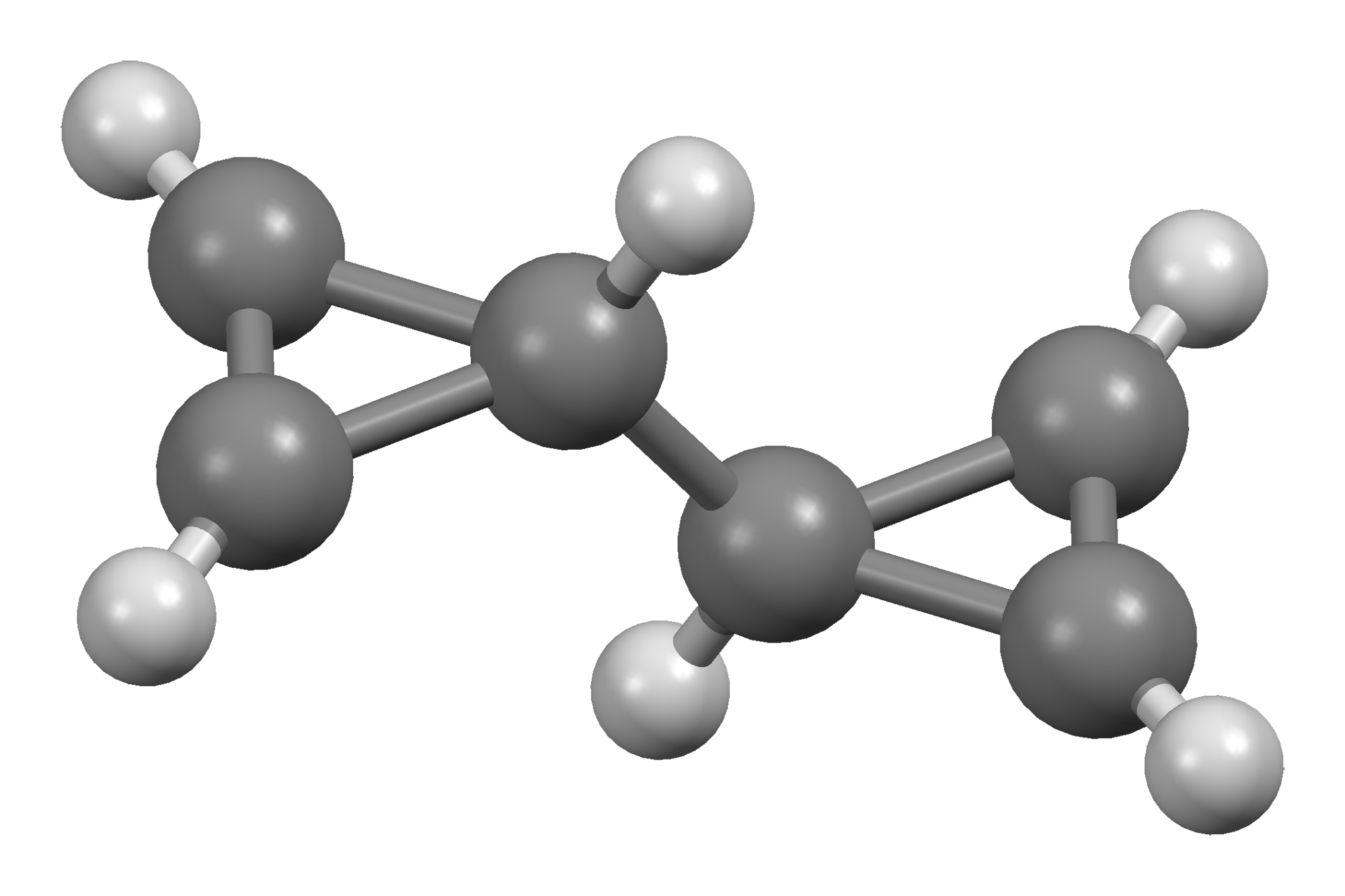

Names
- Preferred IUPAC name [1,1′-Bi(cyclopropane)]-1,1′-diene
- Other names 1,1′-Bi(cycloprop-2-en-1-yl); 3,3'-Bicyclopropenyl

Identifiers
CAS Number	62595-44-2
3D model (JSmol)	Interactive image
ChemSpider	126965
PubChem CID	143919
CompTox Dashboard (EPA)	DTXSID10211640
- InChI: InChI=1S/C6H6/c1-2-5(1)6-3-4-6/h1-6H Key: HVWGZGIZCKXHJV-UHFFFAOYSA-N; InChI=1/C6H6/c1-2-5(1)6-3-4-6/h1-6H Key: HVWGZGIZCKXHJV-UHFFFAOYAR
- SMILES: C\1=C\C/1C\2/C=C/2

Properties
Chemical formula	C_{6}H_{6}
Molar mass	78.1 g/mol
Melting point	−75 °C; −103 °F; 198 K
- Except where otherwise noted, data are given for materials in their standard state (at 25 °C [77 °F], 100 kPa). verify (what is ?) Infobox references

Bicyclopropenyl (bicycloprop-2-enyl, C_{6}H_{6}) is an organic compound and one of several valence isomers of benzene. The molecule can be described as two coupled cyclopropene units. The positions of the alkene groups can vary and therefore two other isomers are known: bicycloprop-1,2-enyl and bicyclopropen-1-yl.

The synthesis of all three isomers was reported in 1989 By Billups and Haley. The 3,3 isomer was formed in two steps by reaction of 1,4-bis(trimethylsilyl)buta-1,3-diene with methyllithium and dichloromethane, introducing two cyclopropane rings into the molecule. The bis(2-chloro-3-(trimethylsilyl)cyclopropan-1-yl) formed is reacted with TBAF. In this latter reaction fluoride couples to the trimethylsilyl group, in the process forming the double bond and forcing the chlorine atom to leave as chloride. In presence of silver ions bicycloprop-2-enyl rearranges to Dewar benzene. The compound can also be trapped by cyclopentadiene. Above −10 °C it decomposes with polymerization.

An X-ray crystal structure has been reported. The bond length for the central bond is short by 1.503 Ångström (150.3 pm).

The other two isomers are increasingly unstable. Bicycloprop-1-enyl can only be detected in trapping experiments.

Properties benzene valence isomers
Compound	Calc. Heat of formation	Calc. Heat of formation
	0 K (KJ/mole)	298 K (KJ/mole)
Benzene	100.5	82.0
Dewar benzene	415.5	397.1
Benzvalene	397.5	378.1
Prismane	567.2	547.0
Bicycloprop-2-enyl	593.6	578.8

Derivatives can be much more stable, for example perfluorohexamethylbicyclopropenyl that must be heated to 360 °C to be as unstable.
