= Kekulé =

Kekulé may refer to:

- August Kekulé (1829–1896), later August Kekule von Stradonitz, German organic chemist
  - Non-Kekulé molecule
- Alexander Kekulé, a German medical microbiologist, virologist and academic
- Kekulé Program a program for entering chemical structures into a database
- Kekulé (crater), on the Moon
- Reinhard Kekulé von Stradonitz (1839–1911), German archeologist, nephew of August
- Stephan Kekulé von Stradonitz (1863–1933), German genealogist, son of August
