= Vyshnegradsky method =

The Vyshnegradsky method is for the chemical reduction of quinoline and ethylpyridine by boiling with tin and hydrochloric acid and also by treatment with sodium in alcoholic media. It was developed by Russian chemist Vyshnegradsky in 1879.

While studying alkaloid structures, Vyshnegradsky obtained ethylpiperidine from ethylpyridine by this method. In 1884 Albert Ladenburg, a German chemist, applied the Vyshnegradsky method to the reduction of other pyridine homologs, and having somewhat modified the method of synthesizing bases, attributed this discovery to himself. The Vyshnegradsky method was extended further to include various classes of organic compounds. It was found that not only could heterocyclic bases of the pyridine or quinoline type be reduced, but also nitriles, oximes, amides, ketones, lactones, esters, halogen derivatives, certain aromatic compounds, and others.
