= Cobalt(II) hydride =

Names
- Other names Cobalt dihydride, cobaltous hydride

Identifiers
3D model (JSmol)	Interactive image
ChemSpider	464927
PubChem CID	22450701
- InChI: InChI=1S/Co.2H/q+2;2*-1 Key: RDKRCUAPGSVALD-UHFFFAOYSA-N
- SMILES: [H-].[H-].[Co+2]

Properties
Chemical formula	CoH_{2}
Molar mass	60.949 g·mol^{−1}
Appearance	dark grey crystals
Density	0.533 g/cm^{3}
Solubility in water	reacts

Hazards
- Occupational safety and health (OHS/OSH)
Main hazards	highly reacts
- Except where otherwise noted, data are given for materials in their standard state (at 25 °C [77 °F], 100 kPa). Infobox references

Cobalt(II) hydride is an inorganic compound with a chemical formula CoH_{2}. It has dark grey crystals. It oxidizes slowly in air and reacts with water.

Two forms of cobalt(II) hydride exist under high pressure. From 4 to 45 GPa there is a face-centred cubic form with formula CoH. This can be decompressed at low temperatures to form a metastable compound at atmospheric pressure. Over 45 GPa a cobalt(II) hydride CoH_{2} also crystallises in a face-centred cubic form.

== Preparation ==
Cobalt(II) hydride can prepared by reacting phenylmagnesium bromide and cobalt(II) chloride in hydrogen gas:

CoCl_{2} + 2 C_{6}H_{5}MgBr + 2 H_{2} → CoH_{2} + 2 C_{6}H_{6} + MgBr_{2} + MgCl_{2}
