= 4-Phenyl-1,2,4-triazole-3,5-dione =

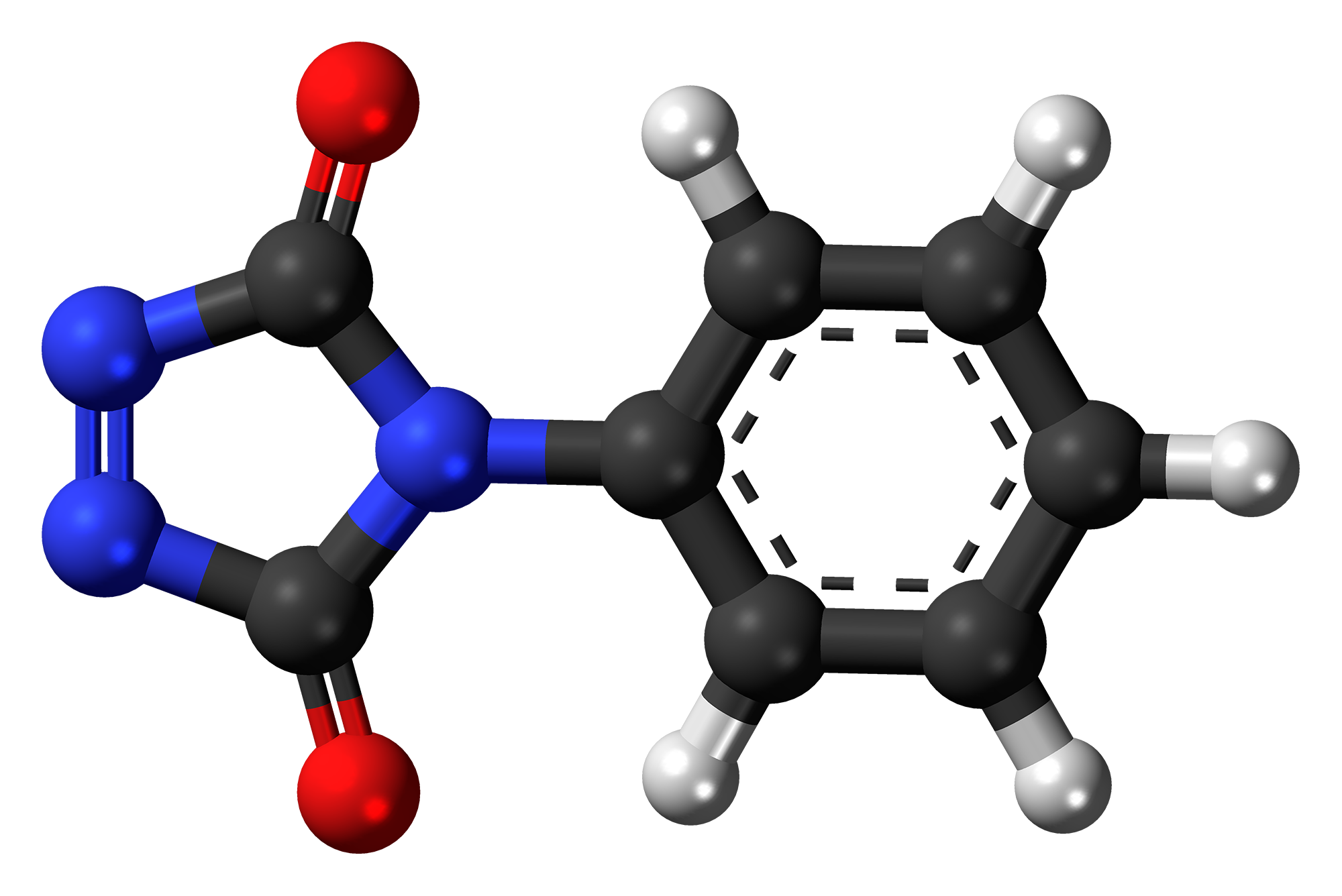

Names
- Preferred IUPAC name 4-Phenyl-3H-1,2,4-triazole-3,5(4H)-dione
- Other names PTAD

Identifiers
CAS Number	4233-33-4
3D model (JSmol)	Interactive image; Interactive image
ChemSpider	70304
ECHA InfoCard	100.021.993
PubChem CID	77913
UNII	V3X3G4TFG6
CompTox Dashboard (EPA)	DTXSID00195142
- InChI: InChI=1S/C8H5N3O2/c12-7-9-10-8(13)11(7)6-4-2-1-3-5-6/h1-5H Key: ISULLEUFOQSBGY-UHFFFAOYSA-N
- SMILES: O=C2/N=N\C(=O)N2c1ccccc1; c1ccc(cc1)N2C(=O)N=NC2=O

Properties
Chemical formula	C_{8}H_{5}N_{3}O_{2}
Molar mass	175.15
Appearance	red solid
Melting point	165 °C (329 °F; 438 K)
- Except where otherwise noted, data are given for materials in their standard state (at 25 °C [77 °F], 100 kPa). verify (what is ?) Infobox references

4-Phenyl-1,2,4-triazoline-3,5-dione (PTAD) is an azodicarbonyl compound. PTAD is one of the strongest dienophiles and reacts rapidly with dienes in Diels-Alder reactions. The most prominent use of PTAD was the first synthesis of prismane in 1973.

== Synthesis ==
The compound was first synthesized in 1894 by Johannes Thiele and Otto Stange. The oxidation of 4-Phenylurazole with lead tetroxide in sulfuric acid yielded small quantities of the substance. It took until 1971 until a practical synthesis was published. The synthesis starts by combining hydrazine and diethyl carbonate. The product of this step is reacted with phenyl isocyanate to form 4-Phenyl-1-carbethoxysemicarbazide (4), which is cyclized with base to form 4-Phenylurazole (5). Oxidation with tert-Butyl hypochlorite then yields PTAD (6).

Synthesis of PTAD
