= John W. Farley =

American physicist

- Born: February 7, 1948
- Died: June 3, 2022 (aged 74)
- Education: Columbia University
- Known for: Laser spectroscopy Lead-bismuth eutectic Environmentalism
- Spouse: Linda Hibbard Farley
- Children: 2
- Scientific career
- Fields: Atomic, Molecular and Optical Physics
- Institutions: University of Oregon; University of Nevada, Las Vegas
- Thesis: Fine structure and hyperfine structure measurements in excited states of alkali atoms by dye laser spectroscopy (1977)
- Doctoral advisor: William Happer

John William Farley (February 7, 1948 – June 3, 2022) was an American atomic physicist and an Emeritus Professor of Physics at the University of Nevada, Las Vegas, as well as the Southern Nevada district's representative to the American Association of Physics Teachers.

== Education ==
Farley received his PhD from Columbia University in 1977. His doctoral advisor was William Happer. He taught physics at the University of Oregon until 1987 when he left Oregon to join the University of Nevada, Las Vegas (UNLV). At UNLV, he was also involved in the installation of Laser spectroscopy equipments with fellow physicist, Victor Kwong, in the 1980s.

== Research ==
Farley's primary research interest was the corrosion of steel by exposure to lead-bismuth eutectic. He also conducted some research into molecular ions, and presented on this research at the International Symposium on Molecular Spectroscopy in 1999.

== Views ==
=== Global warming ===
Farley frequently spoke out about the need for society to take action to avoid dangerous climate change, such as by investing in renewable energy.

=== Power lines ===
Farley contended that the proposed link between proximity to power lines and cancer is not supported by the preponderance of scientific evidence. He also contended that magnetic fields in general have little, if any, effect on human health.

== Personal life ==
In the early 1980s, Farley married his partner Linda. They had two children together.

== Death ==
Farley died on June 3, 2022 at the age of 74 from complications of Parkinson's Disease.
