= Rudolf Ladenburg =

German physicist (1882–1952)

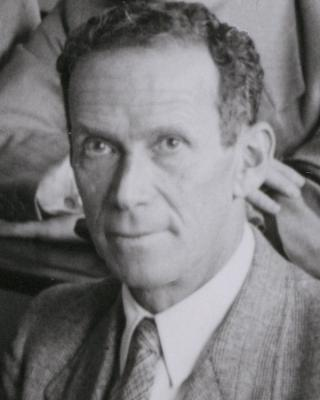
- Ladenburg in 1937
- Born: Rudolf Walter Ladenburg; 6 June 1882; Kiel, Kingdom of Prussia, German Empire
- Died: 6 April 1952 (aged 69); Princeton, New Jersey, U.S.
- Education: Ludwig-Maximilians-Universität München (Dr. phil.)
- Title: Cyrus Fogg Brackett Professor of Physics (1930–50)
- Spouse: Else Uhthoff (m. 1911)
- Children: 3
- Father: Albert Ladenburg
- Scientific career
- Fields: Physics
- Workplaces: University of Breslau (1906–24); Friedrich Wilhelm University of Berlin (1924–30); Princeton University (1930–50)
- Thesis: Über die innere Reibung zäher Flüssigkeiten und ihre Abhängigkeit vom Druck (1906)
- Doctoral advisor: Wilhelm Röntgen
- Doctoral students: Henry Barschall (1940); John Winckler (1946)

Rudolf Walter Ladenburg (6 June 1882 – 6 April 1952) was a German physicist. When the wave of German emigration began in 1933, he was the principal coordinator for job placement of exiled physicists in the United States. Albert Einstein gave the eulogy at Rudolf's funeral.

== Biography ==
Rudolf Walter Ladenburg was born on 6 June 1882 in Kiel, Germany, the son of Jewish chemist Albert Ladenburg and Margarete Pringsheim. He was a non-practicing Jew and an atheist.

From 1900 to 1906, Ladenburg studied at Heidelberg University, the University of Breslau, and the Ludwig-Maximilians-Universität München. In 1906, he received his Ph.D. under Wilhelm Röntgen at the Ludwig-Maximilians-Universität München.

In 1911, Ladenburg married Else Uhthoff, with whom he had three children; Margarethe, Kurt, and Eva.

After completing his habilitation, Ladenburg became a Privatdozent at the University of Breslau, and in 1909 an ausserordentlicher Professor. In 1924, he took an appointment at the Friedrich Wilhelm University of Berlin, along with becoming a scientific member of the Kaiser Wilhelm Institute of Physical Chemistry and Electrochemistry of the Kaiser Wilhelm Society in Berlin.

Ladenburg went to the United States in 1930, when he was appointed to the Cyrus Fogg Brackett Chair of Physics at Princeton University. When the emigration wave from Germany began in April 1933, he was the principal coordinator for the employment of exiled physicists in the United States. He retired from Princeton in 1950.

Ladenburg died on 6 April 1952 in Princeton, New Jersey, at the age of 69.

== Articles ==
- Rudolf Ladenburg and Stanislaw Loria Nature, Anomalous Dispersion of Luminous Hydrogen Volume 79, 7-7 (5 November 1908)
- Rudolf Ladenburg Die quantentheoretische Bedeutung der Zahl der Dispersionelektronen, Z. Phys. Volume 4, Number 4, 451-468 (1921). Received on 8 February 1921. Institutional affiliation: Breslau, Physikal. Institut der Universität. English translation: The quantum-theoretical number of dispersion electrons in B. L. van der Waerden Sources of Quantum Mechanics (Dover, 1968) pp. 139 – 157.
- R. Ladenburg and F. Reiche Dispersionsgesetz und Bohrsche Atomtheorie, Die Naturwissenschaften , Volume 12, Issue 33, pp. 672–673 (1924)
- Hans Kopfermann and Rudolf Ladenburg Elektrooptische Untersuchungen am Natriumdampf. (Anomale elektrische Doppelbrechung; Starkeffekt an der Resonanzstrahlung), Annalen der Physik, Volume 383, Issue 23, pp. 659–679 (1925)
- Hans Kopfermann and Rudolf Ladenburg Untersuchungen über die anomale Dispersion angeregter Gase II Teil. Anomale Dispersion in angeregtem Neon Einfluß von Strom und Druck, Bildung und Vernichtung angeregter Atome, Zeitschrift für Physik Volume 48, Numbers 1-2, pp. 26–50 (January 1928). Received 17 December 1927. Institutional affiliation: Kaiser-Wilhelm Institut für physikalische Chemie und Elektrochemie, Berlin-Dahlem.
- H. Kopfermann and R. Ladenburg Experimental Proof of ‘Negative Dispersion’, Nature Volume 122, 438-439 (22 September 1928)
- R. Ladenburg and S. Levy Untersuchungen über die anomale Dispersion angeregter Gase VI. Teil: Kontrollversuche für den Nachweis der negativen Dispersion: Absorption, anomale Dispersion, Intensitätsverteilung und Intensität verschiedener Neonlinien Zeitschrift für Physik Volume 65, Numbers 3-4. pp. 189–206 (March 1930). Received 12 August 1930. Institutional affiliation: Kaiser-Wilhelm Institut für physikalische Chemie und Elektrochemie, Berlin-Dahlem.
- Rudolf Ladenburg Dispersion in Electrically Excited Gases Rev. Mod. Phys. Volume 5, 243–256 (1933). The author was cited as being at Princeton University.
- Rudolf W. Ladenburg Light absorption and distribution of atmospheric ozone, Journal of the Optical Society of America, Volume 25, Issue 9, p. 259 (1935)
- Max Born, R. Fürth, and Rudolf Ladenburg Long Duration of the Balmer Spectrum in Hydrogen, Nature Volume 157, pp. 159–159 (9 February 1946). Institutional affiliations: Born and Fürth were identified as being in the Department of Mathematical Physics, The University, Edinburgh, and Ladenburg was identified as being in the Palmer Physical Laboratory, Princeton University, Princeton, New Jersey.

== Books ==
- Rudolf Walter Ladenburg Planck's elementares Wirkungsquantum und die Methoden zu seiner Messung (Hirzel, 1921)
