= CO2 Coalition =

Nonprofit conservative think tank and climate denial organization

CO_{2} Coalition
- Motto: "Carbon Dioxide is Essential for Life"
- Founders: Roger Cohen, William Happer, Rodney W. Nichols
- Established: 2015; 11 years ago
- Focus: Environmental policy
- Key people: Gregory Wrightstone, Executive Director
- Location: Arlington, Virginia, United States
- Website: co2coalition.org

The CO_{2} Coalition is a 501(c)(3) nonprofit advocacy organization in the United States founded in 2015. Its climate change denialist claims conflict with the scientific consensus on climate change.

== History ==
The CO_{2} Coalition is a successor to the George C. Marshall Institute, a think tank focusing on defense and climate issues which closed in 2015. William O'Keefe, a chief executive officer of the Marshall Institute and former CEO of the American Petroleum Institute, continued as CEO of the CO_{2} Coalition. William Happer, an emeritus professor of physics known for disagreeing with the consensus on climate change, was another CO_{2} Coalition founder from the Marshall Institute. Happer said the association with climate contrarianism had negatively affected Marshall Institute funding, viz: "Many foundations that would normally have supported defense would not do it because of the Marshall name being associated with climate". The defense activities of the Marshall Institute were moved to the Center for Strategic and International Studies.

In its first four years, the CO_{2} Coalition received over $1 million in contributions from foundations that support conservative causes and from energy industry officials.

In 2023, John Clauser joined the board of the CO_{2} Coalition.

== Activities ==
The CO_{2} Coalition was one of over 40 organizations to sign a letter dated May 8, 2017, to President Donald Trump thanking him for his campaign promise to withdraw from the Paris Agreement, which Trump announced on June 1, 2017.

In 2021 the CO_{2} Coalition submitted a public comment opposing climate change disclosure rules by the U.S. Securities and Exchange Commission. The Coalition asserted "There is no 'climate crisis' and there is no evidence that there will be one," and further "Carbon dioxide, the gas purported to be the cause of catastrophic warming, is not toxic and does no harm." Both assertions are at odds with the scientific consensus on climate change.

In 2022 the Coalition submitted a public comment on climate-related risks to the Commodity Futures Trading Commission, concluding "Real science demonstrates there is no climate emergency and there are no climate-related financial or other risks caused by fossil fuels and CO_{2}." The comment criticized the Intergovernmental Panel on Climate Change assessment reports and U.S. National Climate Assessments, the authoritative consensus summaries of climate science that inform public policy:

Frankly, the "science" cited to support of the CFTC inquiry and possible action is merely government opinion by the International Panel for Climate Change [sic] (IPCC) and the U.S. Global Climate Research Program [sic] (USGCRP), which is not science and cannot be used as the scientific basis for any CFTC or other government action."

In 2023 a CO_{2} Coalition booth was ejected from the National Science Teaching Association annual convention. The Coalition distributed a children's comic book teaching about carbon dioxide as an essential part of life. Climate scientist Andrew Dessler said "By focusing 100 percent on this idea that plants need CO_{2}, they’re intentionally misleading people by avoiding the real problems of CO_{2}, which they didn’t talk about at all." The Coalition also distributed a pamphlet challenging what it called "NSTA's embrace of the hypothesis of 'harmful man-made warming' despite its basis in flawed science and government opinions...." In the contract for appearing at the convention, the organization had agreed its materials would be consistent with the NSTA position on climate change.

As of February 2023 the CO_{2} Coalition had published twelve white papers, six 'climate issues in-depth', eight science policy briefs, coalition member testimonies, and coalition member publications. The group continues to speak publicly and issue press releases on issues relating to energy production, climate change, and advocating for fossil fuels.

== See also ==
- Americans for Prosperity
- Cato Institute
- The Heartland Institute
- The Heritage Foundation
- Manhattan Institute
