= Cyrus Fogg Brackett Chair of Physics =

Endowed professorship at Princeton university

The Cyrus Fogg Brackett Chair of Physics is an endowed professorship established at Princeton University in 1927 by a donation from Thomas D. Jones in honor of Cyrus Fogg Brackett (1833–1915), who was a professor of physics at Princeton University and founder of Princeton University's electrical engineering department.

== Endowment ==
In a January 1927 letter to Princeton University's President John Grier Hibben, Thomas D. Jones wrote:

During my time at Princeton Dr. Brackett was Professor of Physics. He was a man of eminence in his day. I owe to him a debt of gratitude as teacher and friend to which I want to give expression in the form of an endowed professorship in Physics bearing his name.

Thomas D. Jones and his older brother David B. Jones were Princeton graduates, who became wealthy lawyers in Chicago and trustees of Princeton University.

In 1907 ... the Jones brothers gave a $200,000 endowment for the physics and electrical engineering departments. In the late twenties, Thomas Jones and Gwethalyn Jones (daughter of David, who died in 1923) were the University's most generous benefactors when it was seeking $2,000,000 for scientific research to match a conditional $1,000,000 gift from the General Education Board. Thomas gave professorships in mathematics and in physics to express "the debt of gratitude" he owed Henry Burchard Fine and Cyrus Fogg Brackett "as teachers and friends." At the same time, Gwethalyn endowed a chair in chemistry in memory of her father and another in mathematical physics in honor of her uncle. Two years later, they gave an additional $500,000 with which to supplement the income from the four $200,000 chairs in case salaries had to be raised ...

Thomas Jones donated in 1928 $100,000 to Princeton University's Alumni Fund for Faculty Salaries and in his will bequeathed $500,000 for faculty salaries at Princeton University.

== History ==
The chair's first incumbent was Karl Taylor Compton (who received his Ph.D. from Princeton in 1912 and won the 1931 Rumford Prize). Princeton University in 1927 appointed him Director of Research at the Palmer Laboratory and Cyrus Fogg Brackett professor, but he resigned in 1930 to become the president of Massachusetts Institute of Technology.

Perhaps the most controversial holder of the professorship was William Happer, who received many honors and awards, including 1996 election to membership in the National Academy of Sciences and the 2000 Davisson-Germer Prize. According to New York Times reporter Lisa Friedman, Dr. Happer "gained notoriety for claiming that the greenhouse gases contributing to warming the planet are beneficial to humanity" and, in a 2014 interview, for comparing efforts to curb fossil fuels to "the demonization of the poor Jews under Hitler".

== Recipients ==
Holders of the Cyrus Fogg Brackett Chair have been:

- Karl Taylor Compton (1927–1930)
- Rudolf Ladenburg (1930–1950)
- Walker Bleakney (1953–?)
- Robert H. Dicke (1957–1975)
- Val Logsdon Fitch (1976–1982)
- David Todd Wilkinson (?–2002)
- William Happer (2003–2014)
- Lyman Page (2014–2015)
- David Huse (?-Present)
