= William Happer =

American physicist (born 1939)

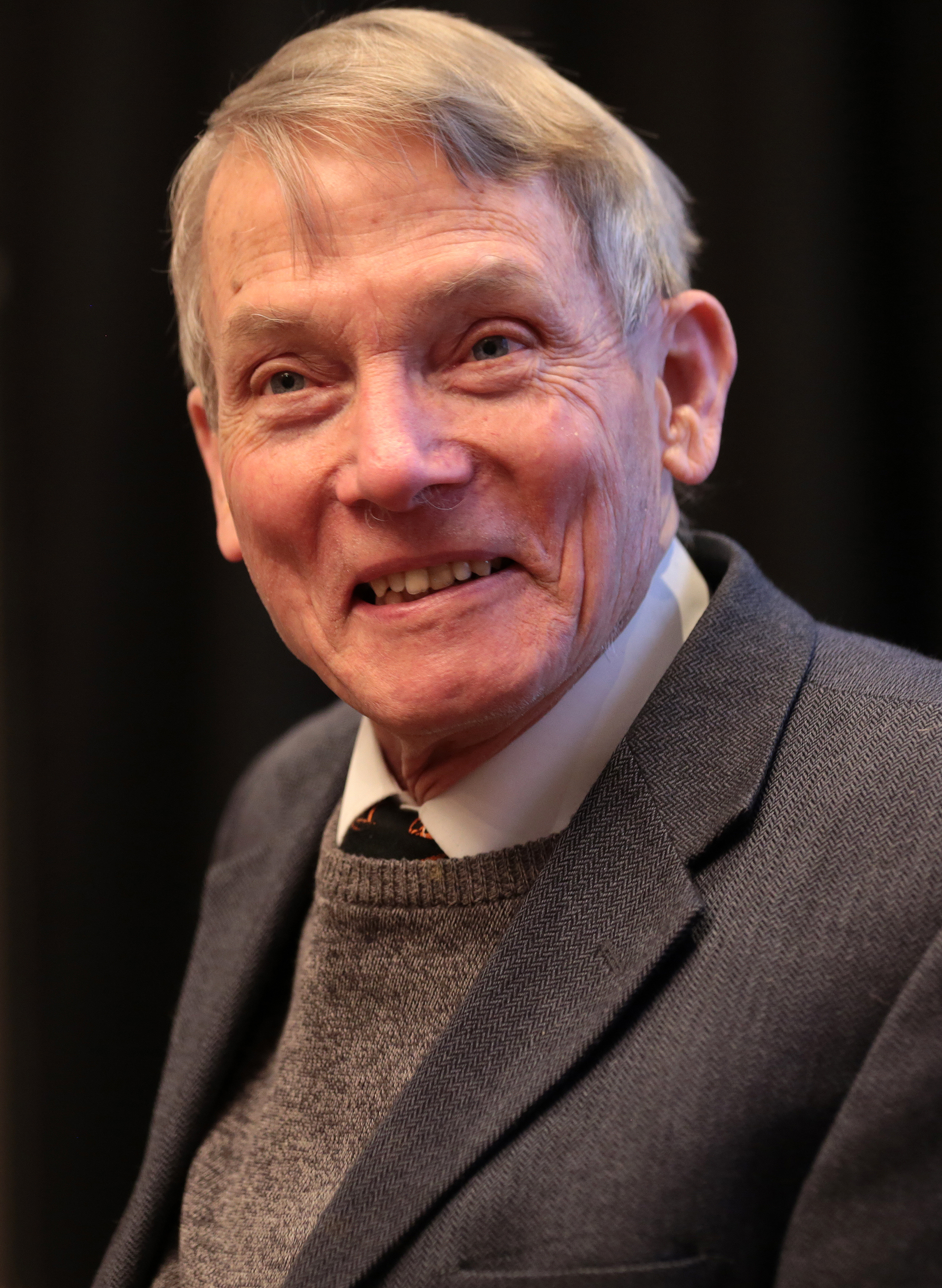
- Happer in 2018
- Born: July 27, 1939 (age 87); Vellore, India
- Education: University of North Carolina, Chapel Hill (BS); Princeton University (MS, PhD)
- Awards: Davisson–Germer Prize in Atomic or Surface Physics
- Scientific career
- Fields: Optical pumping Atomic physics
- Workplaces: Princeton University
- Thesis: Frequency shifts in atomic beams resonances (1964)
- Doctoral students: John Farley
- Other notable students: Julia Hsu

William Happer (born July 27, 1939) is an American physicist who has specialized in the study of atomic physics, optics and spectroscopy. He is the Cyrus Fogg Brackett Professor of Physics, emeritus, at Princeton University, and a long-term member of the JASON advisory group, where he pioneered the development of adaptive optics. From 1991 to 1993, Happer served as director of the Department of Energy's Office of Science as part of the George H.W. Bush administration. He was dismissed from the Department of Energy in 1993 by the Clinton Administration after disagreements on the ozone hole.

Happer, who is not formally trained as a climate scientist, rejects the scientific consensus on climate change. In 2018, Donald Trump appointed him to the National Security Council to counter evidence linking carbon dioxide emissions to global warming. He resigned from the council in 2019.

== Early life and education ==
Happer was born in Vellore, British India, the son of William Happer, a Scottish medical officer in the Indian Army, and Gladys Morgan Happer, a medical missionary for the Lutheran Church of North Carolina. Happer spent the years of World War II with his mother in Oak Ridge, Tennessee. After the war and a return to India, his family emigrated to North Carolina. He studied physics at the University of North Carolina, graduating in 1960. He earned his doctorate at Princeton University in 1964.

== Career ==
Happer's academic career began at Columbia University, where he eventually became a full professor and director of the Columbia Radiation Laboratory.

Happer joined the JASON advisory group in 1976, and was still active there in 2005.

In 1980, he left Columbia to go to Princeton. He is credited with a key insight in 1982 that made adaptive optics possible: there is a layer of sodium in the mesosphere, at around 90 to 100 km of elevation, which could be lit by a laser beam to make an artificial guide star. His idea was tested successfully by DARPA but classified for possible military applications. The military-designed technology was partially unclassified in 1991, after the same idea was independently proposed by two French astronomers. In 1994, Happer and co-authors published a declassified version of the JASON reports on adaptive optics. Happer was chairman of the steering committee for JASON, from 1987 to 1990, and was the Class of 1909 Professor of Physics at Princeton University from 1988 to 1991. In 1991, he joined the United States Department of Energy as director of energy research. He served in that position until being dismissed in 1993 for his views on the ozone layer, after which he returned to his position at Princeton. He co-founded Magnetic Imaging Technologies Inc. in 1994. He held the Cyrus Fogg Brackett Professorship of Physics from 2003 until his retirement in 2014.

Happer has served as a trustee of the MITRE Corporation, the Richard Lounsbery Foundation, and the Marshall Institute, of which he was chairman from 2006 until it was disbanded in 2015.

Happer is a co-founder and board member of an advocacy group called the CO_{2} Coalition, established in 2015. He has described the group as aiming to "educate the public that increased atmospheric levels of CO_{2} will benefit the world". The group has been funded by donations of over $100,000 from the Sarah Scaife Foundation and the Mercer Family Foundation of Robert Mercer and Rebekah Mercer, as well as $50,000 each from the Searle Freedom Trust, the Thomas W. Smith Foundation, the Lynde & Harry Bradley Foundation, and the Achelis and Bodman Foundation.

== Views ==
=== Climate change position ===
Happer disagrees with the scientific consensus on climate change, stating that "Some small fraction of the 1 °C warming during the past two centuries must have been due to increasing CO_{2}, which is indeed a greenhouse gas", but argues that "most of the warming has probably been due to natural causes". Michael Oppenheimer, co-founder of the Climate Action Network, said that Happer’s claims are "simply not true" and that the preponderance of evidence and majority of expert opinion points to a strong anthropogenic influence on rising global temperatures. Climate Science Watch published a point-by-point rebuttal to one of Happer’s articles. A petition that he coauthored to change the official position of the American Physical Society to a version that raised doubts about global warming was overwhelmingly rejected by the APS Council. Happer has no formal training as a climate scientist, and says that his beliefs about climate change come from his experience at the Department of Energy, at which he supervised all non-weapons energy research, including climate change research.

In 2014, Happer said that the "demonization of carbon dioxide is just like the demonization of the poor Jews under Hitler".

In December 2015, Happer was targeted in a sting operation by the environmental activist group Greenpeace. Posing as consultants for a Middle Eastern oil and gas company, they asked Happer to write a report touting the benefits of rising carbon emissions. Happer declined a fee for his work, calling it a "labor of love", but said that they could donate to the "objective evidence" climate-change organization CO_{2} Coalition, which suggested that he contact the Donors Trust to keep the source of the funds secret as requested by the Greenpeace sting operation. Hiding the sources of funding in this way is lawful under U.S. law. Happer further acknowledged that his report would probably not pass peer-review with a scientific journal. In an interview, Happer responded to the sting operation: "I was only interested in helping the 'client' to publicize my long-held views, not to peddle whatever message the 'client' had in mind ... I have never taken a dime for any of my activities to educate the public that more CO_{2} will benefit the world."

=== Political ===
In 2017 following the election of Donald Trump into office, Happer met with Trump to discuss potentially becoming the Science Advisor to the President, and said that he would take the job if it was offered. Happer described Trump as "very attentive" and that the president's concerns "were that of a technically literate person". They discussed the president's uncle John Trump, whom Happer had known. Hannah Devlin of The Guardian wrote that Happer "supports a controversial crackdown on the freedom of federal agency scientists to speak out about their findings, arguing that mixed messages... have led to people disregarding all public health information."

In early September 2018 it was announced that Happer would be appointed senior director of the National Security Council office for emerging technologies. He resigned from the Council in September 2019, reportedly because his plan to review climate science did not receive sufficient support from the White House. It was shelved as some members of the administration, including Kelvin Droegemeier, believed it could harm Trump in his 2020 re-election campaign.

== Honors ==
Happer is a fellow of the American Physical Society. Happer was elected as a member of the American Academy of Arts and Sciences in 1995 and a member of the National Academy of Sciences in 1996. He received a Sloan Research Fellowship in 1967, the Herbert P. Broida Prize in 1997, the Davisson-Germer Prize and the Thomas Alva Edison Patent Award in 2000. In 2003, he was named the Cyrus Fogg Brackett Professor of Physics at Princeton University. Currently, he is a Professor Emeritus.

== Selected publications ==
- Walker, Thad G.; Happer, William (1997). "Spin-exchange optical pumping of noble-gas nuclei". Reviews of Modern Physics. 69 (2): 629–642. Bibcode:1997RvMP...69..629W. doi:10.1103/RevModPhys.69.629.
- Happer, W.; MacDonald, G. J.; Max, C. E.; Dyson, F. J. (1994). "Atmospheric-turbulence compensation by resonant optical backscattering from the sodium layer in the upper atmosphere". Journal of the Optical Society of America A. 11 (1): 263–276. Bibcode:1994JOSAA..11..263H. doi:10.1364/JOSAA.11.000263.
- Happer, William (1972). "Optical Pumping". Reviews of Modern Physics. 44 (2): 169–249. Bibcode:1972RvMP...44..169H. doi:10.1103/RevModPhys.44.169.
- Happer, William (2014). "Why has global warming paused?". International Journal of Modern Physics A. 29 (7). Bibcode:2014IJMPA..2960003H. doi:10.1142/S0217751X14600033.

== See also ==
- Ozone depletion
