= 1,2,3-Cyclohexatriene =

Names
- Preferred IUPAC name Cyclohexa-1,2,3-triene

Identifiers
CAS Number	90866-90-3
3D model (JSmol)	Interactive image
ChEBI	CHEBI:195206
PubChem CID	22138104
CompTox Dashboard (EPA)	DTXSID70622773
- InChI: InChI=1S/C6H6/c1-2-4-6-5-3-1/h1,6H,2,4H2 Key: LQABCMYNMHGWFU-UHFFFAOYSA-N
- SMILES: C1CC=C=C=C1

Properties
Chemical formula	C_{6}H_{6}
Molar mass	78.114 g·mol^{−1}
- Except where otherwise noted, data are given for materials in their standard state (at 25 °C [77 °F], 100 kPa). Infobox references

1,2,3-Cyclohexatriene is an unstable chemical compound with the molecular formula C_{2}(CH)_{2}(CH_{2})_{2}. It is an unusual isomer of benzene in which the three double bonds are cumulated.

This highly strained compound was first prepared in 1990, by reacting a cyclohexadiene derivative with cesium fluoride. The product was too reactive to be isolated on its own, so its existence was confirmed by trapping via a cycloaddition reaction.

Preparation and trapping of 1,2,3-cyclohexatriene

1,2,3-Cyclohexatriene and its derivatives undergo a variety of reactions including cycloadditions, nucleophilic additions, and σ-bond insertions, and therefore they can be versatile reagents for organic synthesis.
