= Wutöschingen =

- Municipality
- Coat of arms

- Location of Wutöschingen within Waldshut district
- Interactive map of Wutöschingen
- Location within Germany Location within Baden-Württemberg
- Coordinates: 47°39′49″N 08°22′08″E
- Country: Germany
- State: Baden-Württemberg
- Admin. region: Freiburg
- District: Waldshut

Government
  - Mayor (2023–31): Rainer Stoll

Area
  - Total: 26.47 km^{2} (10.22 sq mi)
- Elevation: 393 m (1,289 ft)

Population (2025-12-31)
  - Total: 6,820
  - Density: 258/km^{2} (667/sq mi)
- Time zone: UTC+01:00 (CET)
  - Summer (DST): UTC+02:00 (CEST)
- Postal codes: 79793
- Dialling codes: 07746
- Vehicle registration: WT
- Website: www.wutoeschingen.de

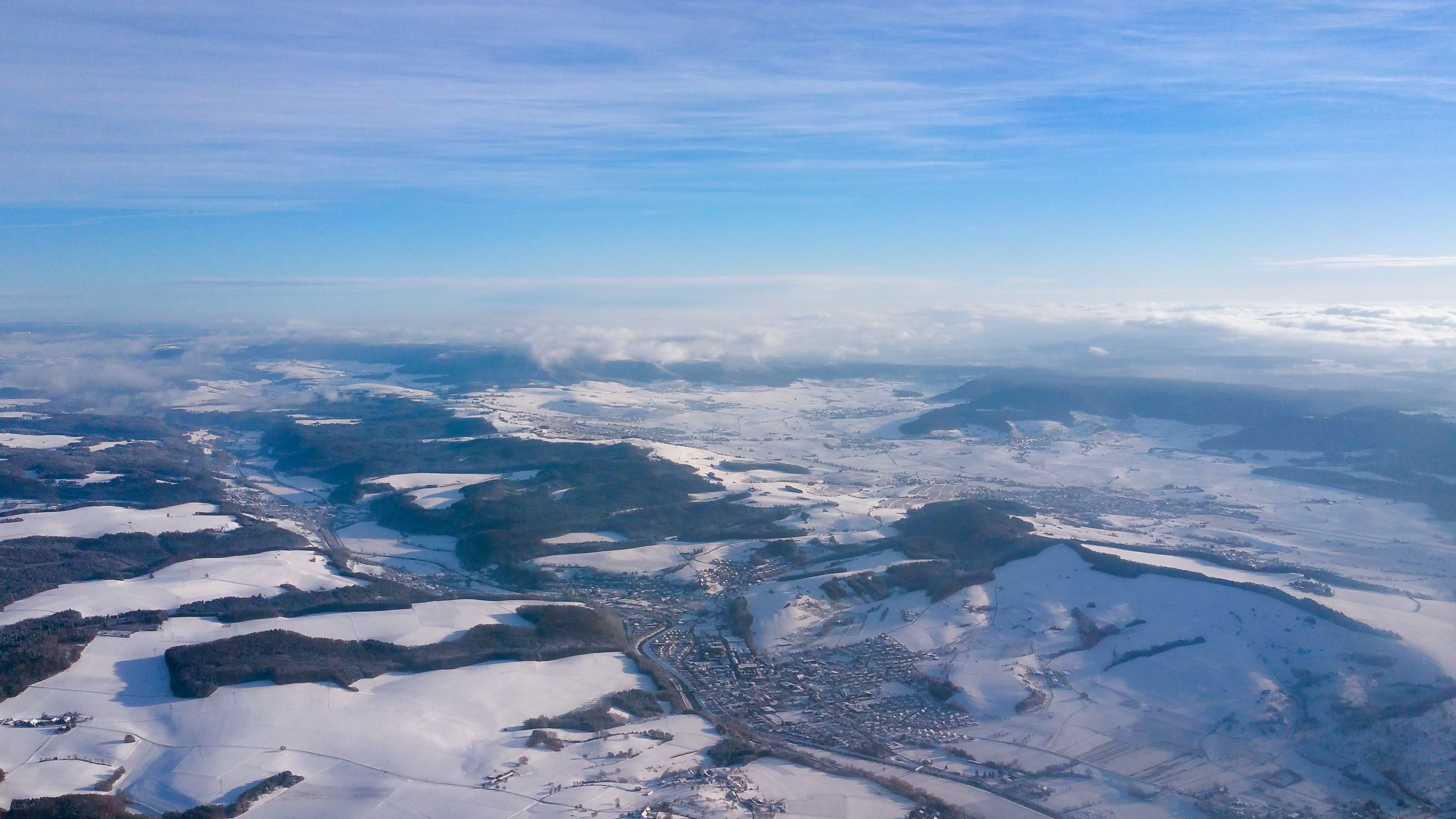
Aerial view of Wutöschingen

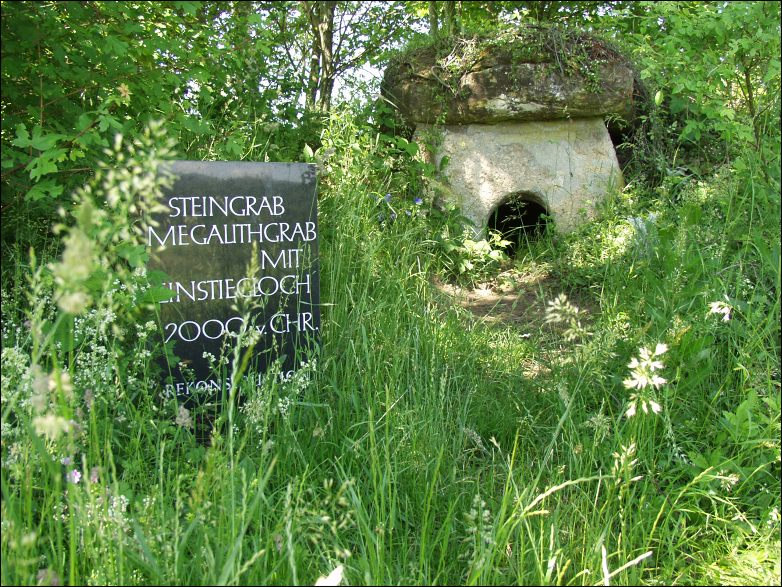
The reconstructed dolmen near Degernau in Wutöschingen, Baden-Württemberg, Germany.

Wutöschingen (German pronunciation: [ˈvuːtʔøːʃɪŋən]) is one of the 25 municipalities in the Waldshut district (Kreis) of Baden-Württemberg, Germany.
