= Kekulé Program =

Kekulé was a computer program named after the chemist Friedrich August Kekulé von Stradonitz. The program was created starting in about 1990 by Joe McDaniel and Jason Balmuth while at Fein-Marquart Associates with funding from the National Cancer Institute under a Small Business Innovative Research Grant.

== Overview ==
The program was created to satisfy a need at the NCI for entering chemical structures into a database. The format required for the database was a connection table while the published form of a structure was a drawing. The program could take a scanned image of the drawn structure and automatically read the atom labels (characters) and lines between atoms (bonds) to create the connection table for input into the database.

NCI has ceased to use the program.

Several articles describing the internal operation of the program were written and published in refereed journals such as the Journal of Chemical Information and Computer Sciences.
