= Claus' benzene =

Names
- Preferred IUPAC name Tetracyclo[2.2.0.0^{2,5}.0^{3,6}]hexane

Identifiers
CAS Number	127296-09-7
3D model (JSmol)	Interactive image
PubChem CID	85607149
CompTox Dashboard (EPA)	DTXSID101336196
- InChI: InChI=1S/C6H6/c1-2-5-3(1)6(2)4(1)5/h1-6H Key: GXPNORVYYCJOAP-UHFFFAOYSA-N
- SMILES: C12C3C4C2C3C41

Properties
Chemical formula	C_{6}H_{6}
Molar mass	78.114 g·mol^{−1}
- Except where otherwise noted, data are given for materials in their standard state (at 25 °C [77 °F], 100 kPa). Infobox references

Claus' benzene (C_{6}H_{6}) is a hypothetical hydrocarbon and an isomer of benzene. It was proposed by Adolf Karl Ludwig Claus in 1867 as a possible structure for benzene at a time when the structure of benzene was still being debated. The molecule can be described as a hexagon with carbon atoms positioned at the corners, with each carbon connected to its two ortho carbons (the nearest carbons) and the one para carbon connected diametrically. High strain energy makes its synthesis impossible. Although it is often referred to alongside Dewar benzene and prismane, it is not possible to synthesize it, while Dewar benzene and prismane can be.
