= Albert Ladenburg =

German chemist (1842–1911)

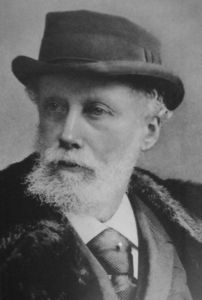
- Born: 2 July 1842; Mannheim, Grand Duchy of Baden (now Germany)
- Died: 15 August 1911 (aged 69); Breslau, Germany (now Poland)
- Education: University of Heidelberg
- Children: Rudolf Ladenburg
- Awards: Davy Medal, 1905

Albert Ladenburg (2 July 1842 – 15 August 1911) was a German chemist. He was the first person to isolate Scopolamine. He worked with August Kekulé on structures of Benzene and incorrectly suggested a prismatic structure, though it was eventually realised in 1973 with the synthesis of Prismane, which is also known as Ladenburg Benzene. He was the father of atomic physicist Rudolf Ladenburg.

== Early life and education ==
Ladenburg was a member of the well-known Jewish Ladenburg family in Mannheim. He was educated at a Realgymnasium at Mannheim and then, after the age of 15, at the technical school of Karlsruhe, where he studied mathematics and modern languages. He then proceeded to the University of Heidelberg where he studied chemistry and physics with Robert Bunsen. He also studied physics in Berlin. He got his Ph.D. in Heidelberg.

== Academic career ==
In 1873, Ladenburg went to Kiel as professor of chemistry and director of the laboratory, remaining there until 1889 when he went to the University of Breslau in the same capacity. He was made an honorary member of the Pharmaceutical Society of Great Britain in 1886 and received the Hanbury Medal for original research in chemistry in 1889. In 1892 the Manchester Literary and Philosophical Society awarded Ladenburg honorary membership of the Society. From June 1910, he was corresponding member of the Prussian Academy of Sciences.

Ladenburg isolated hyoscine, also known as scopolamine for the first time in 1880. In 1900 Ladenburg founded the Chemische Gesellschaft Breslau, which he managed until 1910. He was also awarded the prestigious Davy Medal in 1905 "for his researches in organic chemistry, especially in connection with the synthesis of natural alkaloids".

Ladenburg also addressed the relation of religion and science in a book he published in 1904, where he dealt with the topics of "Science and spiritual life" and Christianity.

== Research ==
Prismane (isomer of benzene)

In Ghent, Ladenburg worked for 6 months with August Kekulé who introduced him to structural theory. They worked on the structure of Benzene. Ladenburg's theory that benzene was a prismatic molecule turned out to be wrong. His proposed structure was eventually realised in 1973 in the molecule prismane.

Ladenburg visited England, and then went on to work for 18 months in Paris with Charles-Adolphe Wurtz and Charles Friedel on organosilicon compounds and tin compounds. He then returned to Heidelberg to teach.

== Family ==
His son Rudolf (1882–1952) became an atomic physicist. His other son Eric died in a boating accident in the early 1900s.

== Publications ==
- Entwicklungsgeschichte der Chemie von Lavoisier bis zur Gegenwart (History of the development of chemistry from Lavoisier to the present; 1868)
- Vorträge über die Entwicklungsgeschichte der Chemie in den letzten hundert Jahren. Vieweg, Braunschweig 1869. Digital edition of the University and State Library Düsseldorf.
- Handwörterbuch der Chemie (Handy Dictionary of Chemistry; collaborator, 13 vols., 1882–96)
- Religion und Naturwissenschaft: eine Antwort an Professor Ladenburg (1904)
- Vortraege ueber die Entwicklungsgeschichte der Chemie von Lavoisier bis zur Gegenwart . Vieweg, Braunschweig 4th ed. 1907 Digital edition of the University and State Library Düsseldorf
- Lebenserinnerungen (Reminiscences; 1912)
