= Prismane =

Chemical structure of prismane
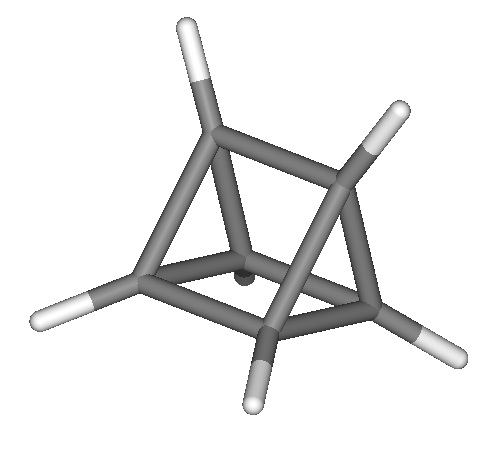
Chemical structure of prismane
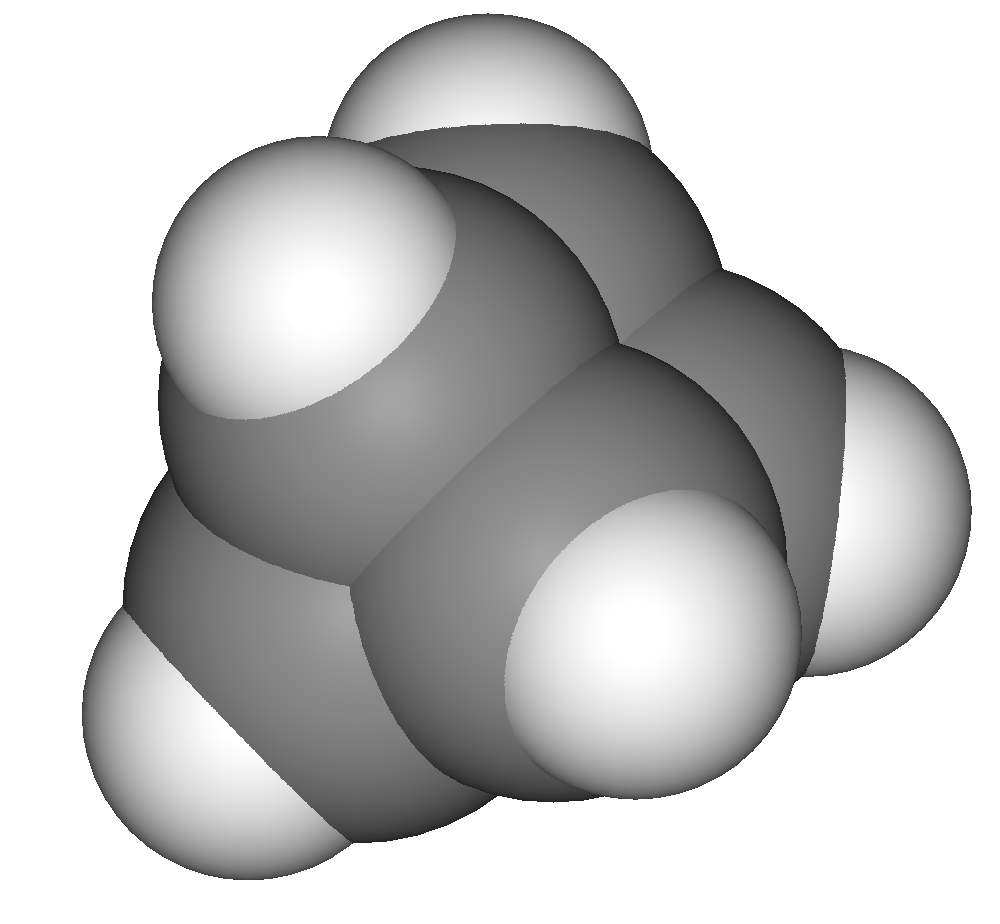
- CPK model of prismane

Names
- Preferred IUPAC name Tetracyclo[2.2.0.0^{2,6}.0^{3,5}]hexane

Identifiers
CAS Number	650-42-0
3D model (JSmol)	Interactive image
ChemSpider	16736515
PubChem CID	12305738
CompTox Dashboard (EPA)	DTXSID90486733
- InChI: InChI=1S/C6H6/c1-2-3(1)6-4(1)5(2)6/h1-6H Key: RCJOMOPNGOSMJU-UHFFFAOYSA-N; InChI=1/C6H6/c1-2-3(1)6-4(1)5(2)6/h1-6H Key: RCJOMOPNGOSMJU-UHFFFAOYAA
- SMILES: C12C3C1C4C2C34

Properties
Chemical formula	C_{6}H_{6}
Molar mass	78.114 g·mol^{−1}
- Except where otherwise noted, data are given for materials in their standard state (at 25 °C [77 °F], 100 kPa). verify (what is ?) Infobox references

Prismane or Ladenburg benzene is a polycyclic hydrocarbon with the formula C_{6}H_{6}. It is an isomer of benzene, specifically a valence isomer. Prismane is far less stable than benzene. The carbon (and hydrogen) atoms of the prismane molecule are arranged in the shape of a six-atom triangular prism—this compound is the parent and simplest member of the prismanes class of molecules. Albert Ladenburg proposed this structure for the compound now known as benzene. The compound was not synthesized until 1973.

== History ==
In the mid 19th century, investigators proposed several possible structures for benzene which were consistent with its empirical formula, C_{6}H_{6}, which had been determined by combustion analysis. The first, which was proposed by Friedrich August Kekulé von Stradonitz in 1865, later proved to be closest to the true structure of benzene. This structure inspired several others to draw structures that were consistent with benzene's empirical formula; for example, Albert Ladenburg proposed prismane, James Dewar proposed Dewar benzene, and Koerner and Claus proposed Claus' benzene. Some of these structures would be synthesized in the following years. Prismane, like the other proposed structures for benzene, is still often cited in the literature, because it is part of the historical struggle toward understanding the mesomeric structures and resonance of benzene. Some computational chemists still research the differences between the possible isomers of C_{6}H_{6}.

== Properties ==
Prismane is a colourless liquid at room temperature. Studying its properties and reactivity is difficult, because all known syntheses have rather low yields.

The deviation of the carbon-carbon bond angle from 109° to 60° in a triangle leads to a high ring strain, reminiscent of that of cyclopropane but greater. The compound is explosive, which is unusual for a hydrocarbon. Due to this ring strain, the bonds have a low bond energy and break at a low activation energy, which makes synthesis of the molecule difficult; Woodward and Hoffmann noted that prismane's thermal rearrangement to benzene is symmetry-forbidden, comparing it to "an angry tiger unable to break out of a paper cage". On account of its strain energy and the aromatic stabilization of benzene, the molecule is estimated to be 90 kcal/mole less stable than benzene, but the activation of this highly exothermic transformation is a surprisingly high 33 kcal/mol, making it persistent at room temperature.

Substituted derivatives appear more stable, probably because of steric hindrance against decomposition.

== Synthesis ==
Synthesis of prismane:

Katz and Acton's original synthesis starts from benzvalene (1) and 4-phenyltriazolidone (2), which is a strong dienophile. The reaction is a stepwise Diels-Alder like reaction, forming a carbocation as intermediate. The adduct (3) is then hydrolyzed under basic conditions and afterwards transformed into a copper(II) chloride derivative with acidic copper(II) chloride. Neutralized with a strong base, the azo compound (5) could be crystallized with 65% yield. The last step is a photolysis of the azo compound. This photolysis leads to a biradical which forms prismane (6) and nitrogen with a yield of less than 10% (in Katz and Acton's work, 1.8%, but subsequently improved). The compound was isolated by preparative gas chromatography.

The stabler hexamethylprismane (in which all six hydrogens are substituted by methyl groups) and was synthesized by rearrangement reactions in 1966. Other derivatives are formed in low (≈15%) yield from direct irradiation of Dewar benzenes, and tert-butylfluoroacetylene trimerizes directly to the corresponding prismane.

== See also ==
- Prismane C8, a C_{8} allotrope of carbon
- Cubane
