= Dewar benzene =

- The conjoined cyclobutene rings of Dewar benzene form an obtuse angle.

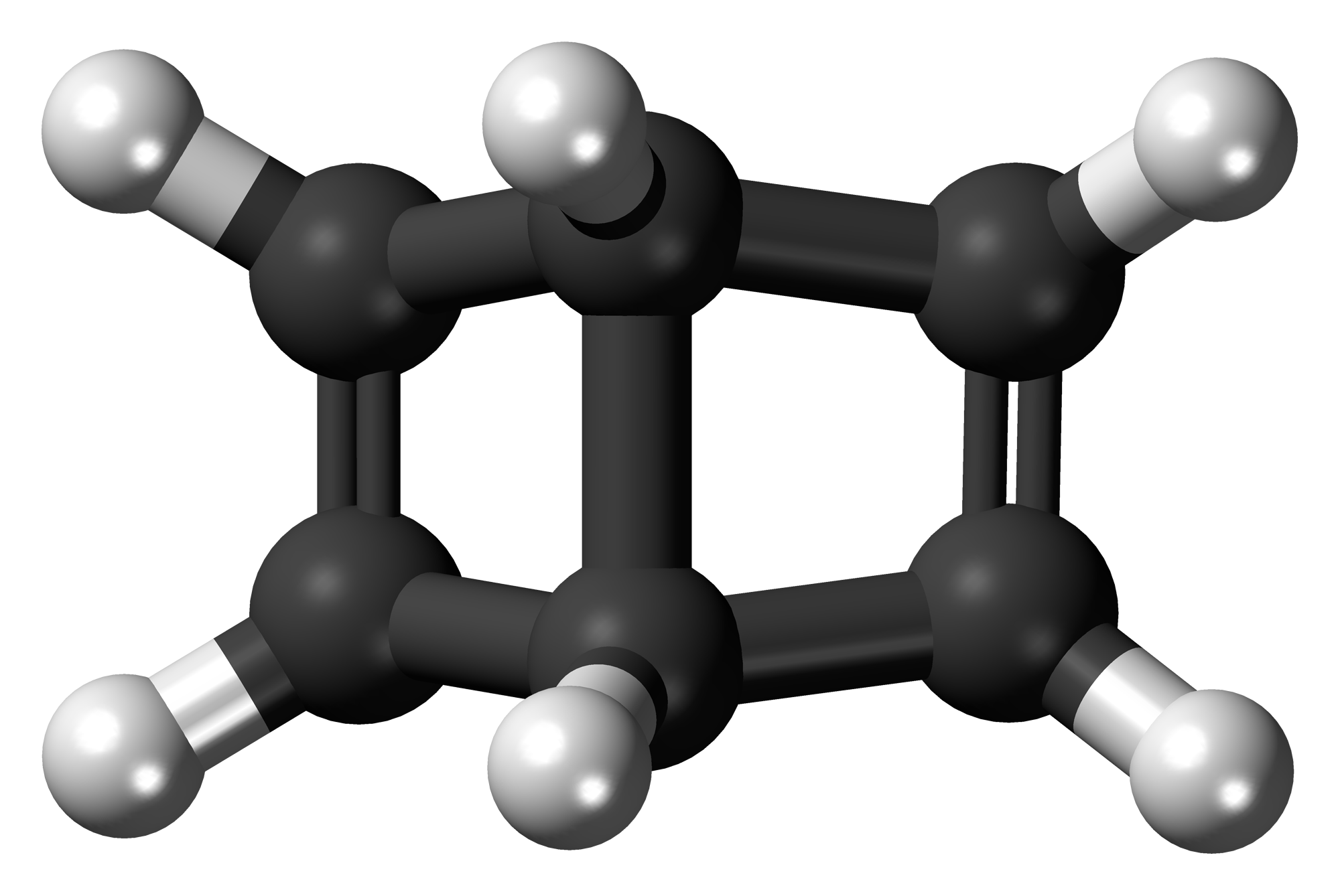

Names
- Preferred IUPAC name Bicyclo[2.2.0]hexa-2,5-diene

Identifiers
CAS Number	5649-95-6
3D model (JSmol)	Interactive image
ChemSpider	89242
PubChem CID	98808
UNII	885QNL8RTB
CompTox Dashboard (EPA)	DTXSID00205033
- InChI: InChI=1S/C6H6/c1-2-6-4-3-5(1)6/h1-6H Key: CTLSARLLLBZBRV-UHFFFAOYSA-N; InChI=1/C6H6/c1-2-6-4-3-5(1)6/h1-6H Key: CTLSARLLLBZBRV-UHFFFAOYAO
- SMILES: C\1=C\C2/C=C\C/12

Properties
Chemical formula	C_{6}H_{6}
Molar mass	78.1 g·mol^{−1}
- Except where otherwise noted, data are given for materials in their standard state (at 25 °C [77 °F], 100 kPa). Infobox references

Dewar benzene (also spelled dewarbenzene) or bicyclo[2.2.0]hexa-2,5-diene is a bicyclic isomer of benzene with the molecular formula C_{6}H_{6}. The compound is named after James Dewar who included this structure in a list of possible C_{6}H_{6} structures in 1869. However, he did not propose it as the structure of benzene, and in fact he supported the correct structure previously proposed by August Kekulé in 1865.

== Structure and properties ==
Unlike benzene, Dewar benzene is not flat because the carbons where the rings join are bonded to four atoms rather than three. These carbons tend toward tetrahedral geometry, and the two cyclobutene rings make an angle where they are cis-fused to each other. The compound has considerable strain energy and reverts to benzene with a chemical half-life of two days. This thermal conversion is relatively slow because orbital symmetries forbid it.

== Synthesis and derivatives ==
The first synthesis of a compound containing a Dewar benzene core was a tri-tert-butyl derivative, by photoisomerization of the analogous benzene structure in 1962. The large groups ortho to each other have a destabilizing effect in the planar benzene-ring isomer more-so than in the non-planar Dewar benzene structure.

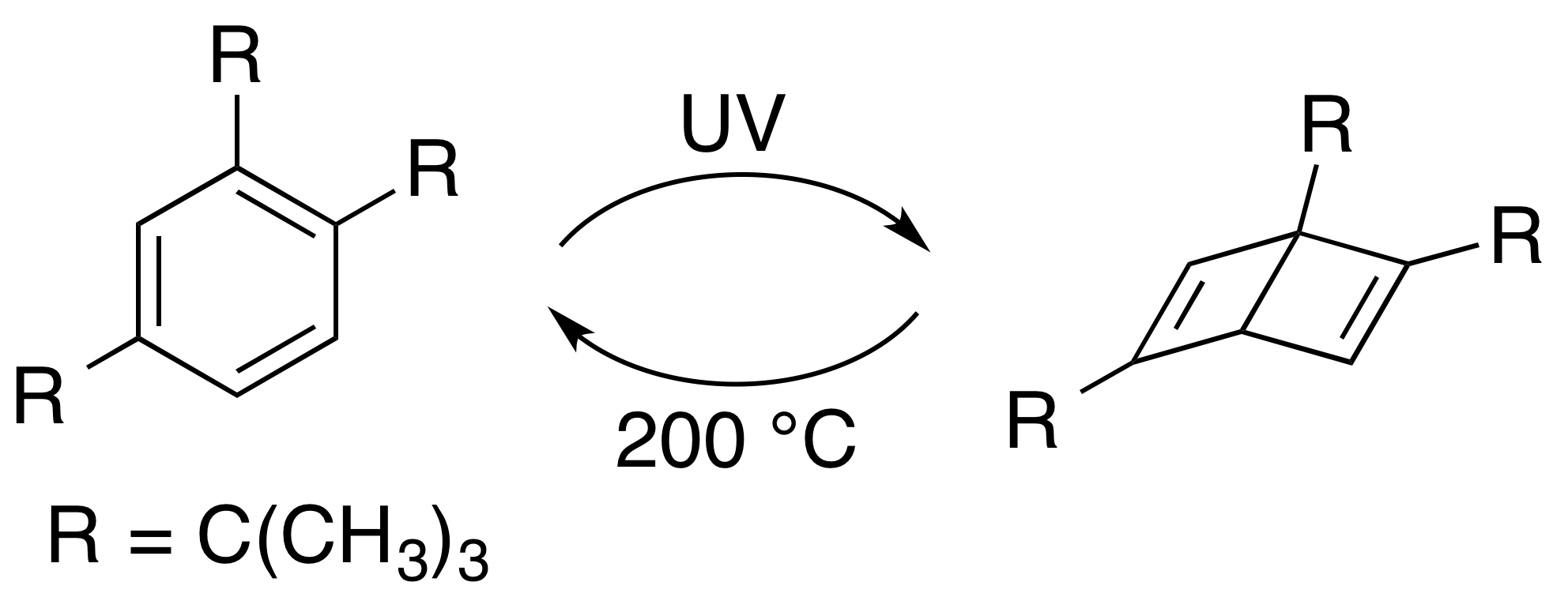

The next year, the unsubstituted Dewar benzene itself was synthesized by photoisomerization of the cis-1,2-dihydro derivative of phthalic anhydride followed by oxidation with lead tetraacetate.

Hexamethyl Dewar benzene has been prepared by bicyclotrimerization of dimethylacetylene with aluminium chloride.

== "Dewar benzene" and benzene ==
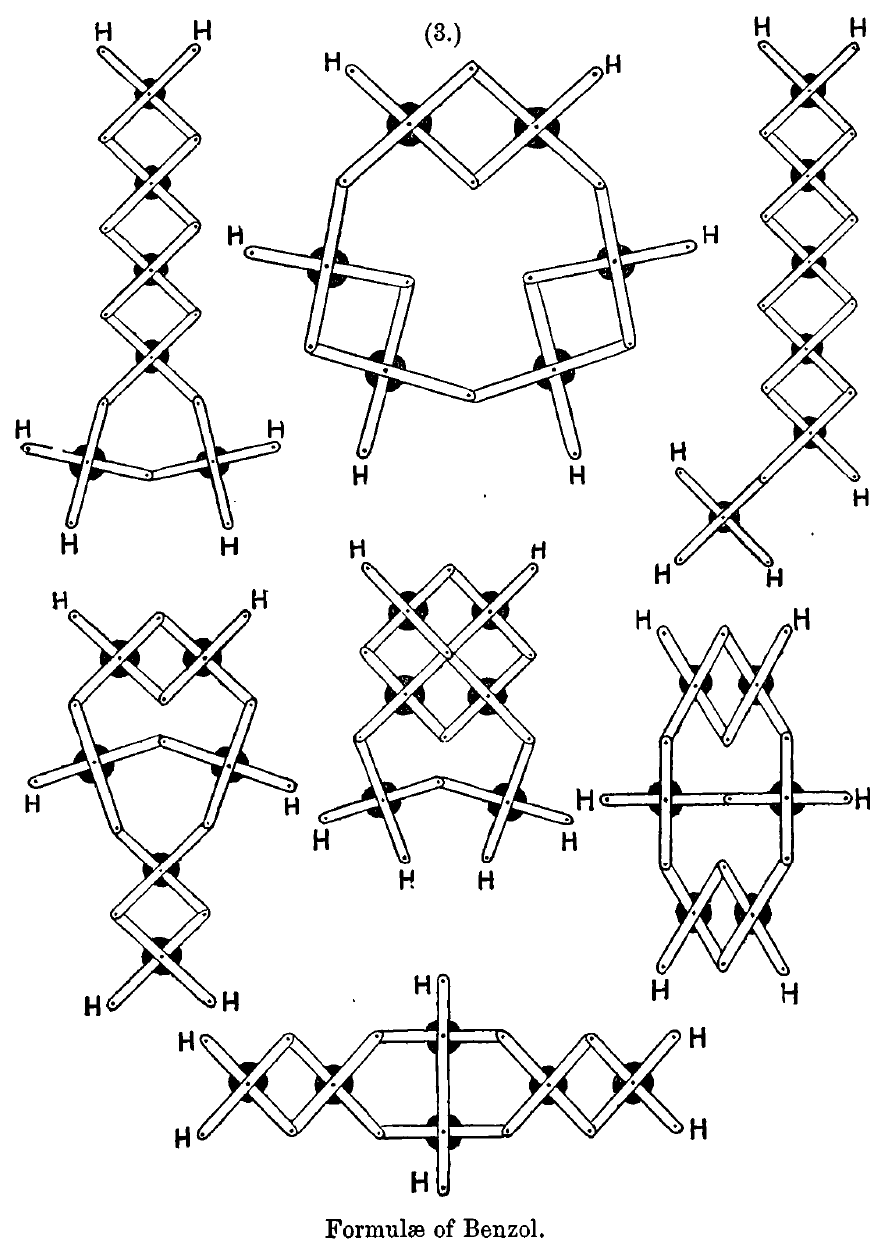
Seven possible isomers proposed by Dewar, with "Dewar benzene" in second row, right

It is sometimes incorrectly claimed that Dewar proposed his structure as the true structure of benzene. In fact, Dewar merely wrote the structure as one of seven example isomers and believed that his experiments on benzene supported the (correct) structure that had been proposed by Friedrich August Kekulé von Stradonitz.

After the development of valence bond theory in 1928, benzene was described primarily using its two major resonance contributors, the two Kekulé structures. The three possible Dewar structures were considered as minor resonance contributors in the overall description of benzene, alongside other classic structures such as the isomers prismane, benzvalene and Claus' benzene. Prismane and benzvalene were synthesized in the 1970s; Claus' benzene is impossible.

== Related structures ==
Other chemicals with a similar bicyclo[2.2.0] motif are sometimes described as having a "Dewar" structure.

One class of compounds having the Dewar structure are produced by the photoisomerization of pyrimidinones, which is found in some of the pyrimidine dimers formed when ultraviolet light damages DNA.

A mixture of cyclotriphosphazene—an inorganic benzene analog consisting of alternating phosphorus and nitrogen atoms—and its Dewar-type isomer were formed by a solid-phase reaction of ammonia and phosphine when irradiated with an electron beam.

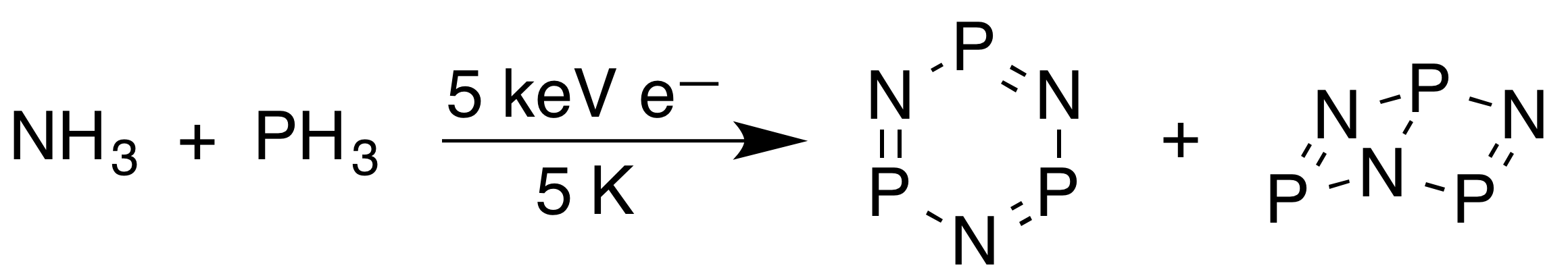

A Dewar core of four boron atoms and two nitrogen atoms has also been synthesized. Hexafluorobenzene undergoes isomerization to the corresponding Dewar benzene structure when irradiated with high energy UV light.
