= Benzvalene =

Names
- Preferred IUPAC name Tricyclo[3.1.0.0^{2,6}]hex-3-ene

Identifiers
CAS Number	659-85-8
3D model (JSmol)	Interactive image
ChemSpider	120239
PubChem CID	136470
CompTox Dashboard (EPA)	DTXSID00216109
- InChI: InChI=1S/C6H6/c1-2-4-5-3(1)6(4)5/h1-6H Key: VMQPMGHYRISRHO-UHFFFAOYSA-N; InChI=1/C6H6/c1-2-4-5-3(1)6(4)5/h1-6H Key: VMQPMGHYRISRHO-UHFFFAOYAJ
- SMILES: C1=CC2C3C1C23

Properties
Chemical formula	C_{6}H_{6}
Molar mass	78.114 g·mol^{−1}
- Except where otherwise noted, data are given for materials in their standard state (at 25 °C [77 °F], 100 kPa). verify (what is ?) Infobox references

Benzvalene is an organic compound and one of several isomers of benzene. It was first synthesized in 1967 by K. E. Wilzbach et al. via photolysis of benzene and the synthesis was later improved by Thomas J. Katz et al.

The 1971 synthesis consisted of treating cyclopentadiene with methyllithium in dimethyl ether and then with dichloromethane and methyllithium in dimethyl ether at −45 °C. It can also be formed in low yield (along with fulvene and Dewar benzene) by irradiation of benzene at 237 to 254 nm. The hydrocarbon in solution was described as having an extremely foul odor. Due to the high steric strain present in benzvalene, the pure compound (~71 kcal/mol higher in energy than benzene) easily detonates, for example by scratching.

The compound converts to benzene with a chemical half-life of approximately 10 days. This symmetry-forbidden transition is believed to take place through a diradical intermediate.

== Polybenzvalene ==
Benzvalene can be polymerized in a ring opening metathesis polymerisation to polybenzvalene. This polymer contains highly strained bicyclobutane rings which again makes it a sensitive material. The rings can be isomerized to 1,3-dienes and for this reason polybenzvalene has been investigated as a precursor to polyacetylene.
