= Carl Schorlemmer =

German and British chemist (1834–1892)

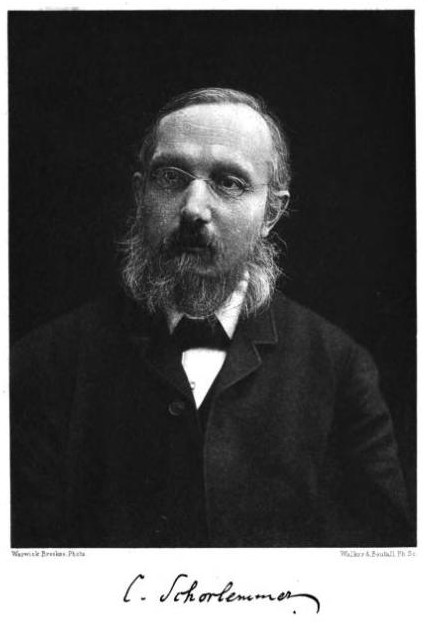
- Born: 30 September 1834; Darmstadt, German Confederation
- Died: 27 June 1892 (aged 57); Manchester, England
- Education: University of Heidelberg, University of Giessen
- Known for: Alkane isomerism; History of organic chemistry
- Scientific career
- Fields: Organic chemistry
- Workplaces: Owens College (1860–1892; now University of Manchester)

Carl Schorlemmer FRS (30 September 1834 – 27 June 1892) was a German and British chemist who did research on hydrocarbons, particularly paraffins, and was a pioneer in the study of the history of chemistry. He was a professor of chemistry at Owens College, Manchester and a fellow of the Royal Society (1871) and the American Philosophical Society (1878). He was also a revolutionary of 1848, an early Communist, and a personal friend of Karl Marx and Friedrich Engels who was one of the thirteen people to attend Marx's funeral; he is sometimes known as "the red chemist."

== Early life and education ==
Schorlemmer was born on 30 September 1834 in Darmstadt, German Confederation, the son of a joiner. He was able to visit Realschule and later — against the will of his poor father — trade school. As a teenager, he participated in the German revolutions of 1848–1849 in Baden.

Schorlemmer started his training to become a pharmacist in 1853 in Groß-Umstadt. During his training he made own chemical experiments in the laboratory and was interested in astronomy and botany. After two and a half years he passed his exam, became an assistant pharmacist and worked in the Schwanen pharmacy in Heidelberg. Having attended some lectures of Robert Wilhelm Bunsen, he studied pharmacy and chemistry in Heidelberg and in Giessen (where he attended lectures of Heinrich Will and Hermann Franz Moritz Kopp, a historian of chemistry).

== Career ==
At age 24 he moved to Manchester as a private assistant to chemist Henry Roscoe. Three years later, c. 1860, he became demonstrator at Owens College in Manchester. His first research was on the distillation of halide acids, and in 1861 he began the work on paraffins, now known as alkanes, for which he would become known best. This followed up the work of Hermann Kolbe and Edward Frankland introducing alkane isomerism from 1848–1850. In 1864 he proved that their "ethane" and "ethyl hydride" were identical. In 1868 he developed a method to convert a secondary alcohol into a primary alcohol.

He was elected to membership of the Manchester Literary and Philosophical Society on 13 December 1870. In 1874, Schorlemmer became a chaired professor of organic chemistry at Owens College in Manchester. He continued his research on paraffin hydrocarbons, particularly their chlorides and bromides and isomerism, he studied the compounds aurin, rosaniline, suberone, azelaic acid, and safranin, and he also began to publish on the history of chemistry. His "Chemistry of the Carbon Compounds" (1874) was considered by his contemporaries to be "the first systematic treatise on modern organic chemistry in the English language."

He became a member of the Royal Society in the UK in 1871, and in 1878, he was elected as a member of the American Philosophical Society. He became a citizen of Britain on 20 May 1879.

== Death ==
Towards the end of Schorlemmer's life, his health worsened. He died due to a lung disease at his house in Manchester, England on June 27, 1892. He was unmarried.

After his death, Owens College endowed a Carl Schorlemmer Memorial Laboratory for organic chemistry, the first of its kind in Britain.

== Connections with Marx and Engels ==
Schorlemmer was a friend of Karl Marx and Friedrich Engels, who asked him for advice on scientific questions. Schorlemmer was one of the thirteen people at Marx's funeral. His sociological analysis of the history of chemistry had a significant influence on Engels and Marx's views on the development of natural sciences. He met Marx in 1868 after meeting Engels in or before March 1865.

At Schorlemmer's death, Engels published an obituary in Vorwärts, the central organ of the Social Democratic Party of Germany. Engels said that Schorlemmer spent his holidays regularly in London with Marx and Engels when he did not visit Germany. Engels also claimed in his obituary that Schorlemmer was open about his allegiance to the Communist cause, and that Schorlemmer was unusual in that he held the German philosopher Hegel in high regard at a time when the latter was "much despised". Engels added that, "What we know today about paraffins, we owe mainly to Schorlemmer... Thus he became one the joint founders of today's scientific organic chemistry." For this connection with Marx and Engels, Schorlemmer is sometimes referred to as the "red" chemist.

== Writings ==
Schorlemmer wrote several books about organic chemistry, the most important one being A Treatise on Chemistry (1874), which he co-authored with Henry Roscoe. Schorlemmer is considered to have made an essential contribution to the history of chemistry as an academic field in his later works, culminating in his book Rise and Development of Organic Chemistry (1879).

Towards the end of his life, Schorlemmer began to write a book about the history of chemistry from antiquity to the 17th century. He died before finishing his work, so it was never published. The manuscript covers about 1,100 pages and is stored in John Rylands Library.

=== Selected writings ===
- A Manual of Chemistry of the Carbon Compounds; or, Organic Chemistry (1874)
- A Treatise on Chemistry (1877) - with Henry Roscoe
- Rise and Development of Organic Chemistry (1879)

== See also ==
- List of German chemists
