= Sodium ethoxide =

Ionic compound made of a C2H5–O anion and a sodium cation

- Ball-and-stick model of the sodium cation

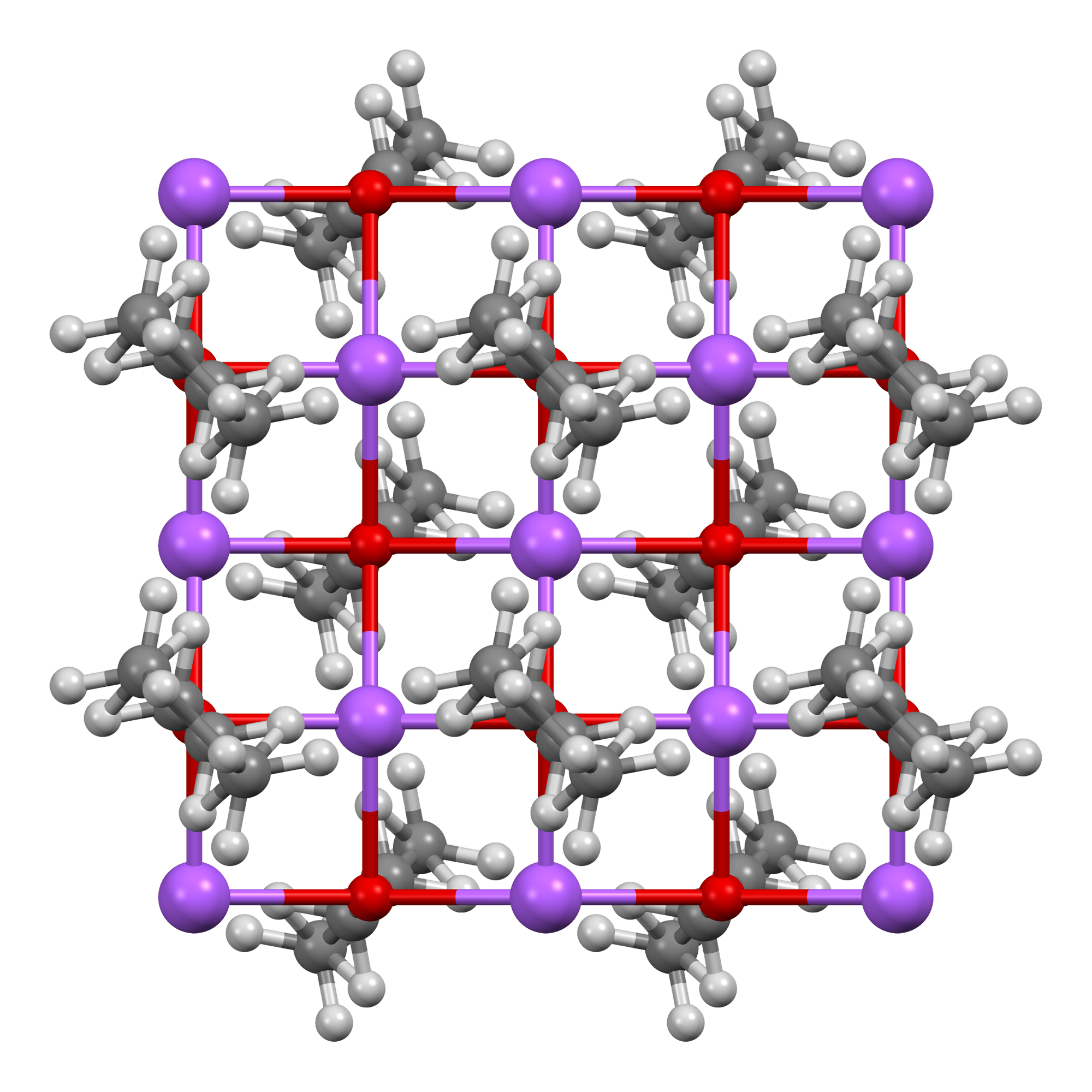

Names
- IUPAC name Sodium ethoxide
- Other names Sodium ethanolate, sodium ethylate (obsolete)

Identifiers
| CAS Number | 141-52-6 |
| 3D model (JSmol) | Interactive image |
| Abbreviations | EtONa |
| Beilstein Reference | 3593646 |
| ChEBI | CHEBI:52096 |
| ChemSpider | 8516 |
| ECHA InfoCard | 100.004.989 |
| EC Number | 205-487-5 |
| PubChem CID | 2723922 |
| UNII | 1I9504387J |
| CompTox Dashboard (EPA) | DTXSID3027089 |
- InChI: InChI=1S/C2H5O.Na/c1-2-3;/h2H2,1H3;/q-1;+1 Key: QDRKDTQENPPHOJ-UHFFFAOYSA-N; InChI=1/C2H5O.Na/c1-2-3;/h2H2,1H3;/q-1;+1 Key: QDRKDTQENPPHOJ-UHFFFAOYAQ
- SMILES: [Na+].[O-]CC

Properties
| Chemical formula | C_{2}H_{5}NaO |
| Molar mass | 68.051 g·mol^{−1} |
| Appearance | White hygroscopic powder |
| Density | 0.868 g/cm^{3} (of a 21 wt% solution in ethanol) |
| Melting point | 260 °C (500 °F; 533 K) |
| Solubility in water | Reacts |
| Solubility | ethanol and methanol |
| Acidity (pK_{a}) | 15.5 |

Hazards
- GHS labelling
| Pictograms | (GHS02: Flammable) (GHS05: Corrosive) (GHS07: Exclamation mark) |
| Signal word | Danger |
| Hazard statements | H228, H251, H302, H314 |
| Precautionary statements | P210, P235+P410, P240, P241, P260, P264, P270, P280, P301+P312, P301+P330+P331, P303+P361+P353, P304+P340, P305+P351+P338, P310, P321, P330, P363, P370+P378, P405, P407, P413, P420, P501 |
| NFPA 704 (fire diamond) | 2 2 1 W |
| Safety data sheet (SDS) | Oxford MSDS |
- Except where otherwise noted, data are given for materials in their standard state (at 25 °C [77 °F], 100 kPa). verify (what is ?) Infobox references

Sodium ethoxide, also referred to as sodium ethanolate, is the ionic, organic compound with the formula CH_{3}CH_{2}ONa, C_{2}H_{5}ONa, or NaOEt (Et = ethyl). It is a white solid, although impure samples appear yellow or brown. It dissolves in polar solvents such as ethanol. It is commonly used as a strong base.

== Preparation ==
Few procedures have been reported to prepare the anhydrous solid. Instead the material is typically prepared in a solution with ethanol. It is commercially available and as a solution in ethanol. It is easily prepared in the laboratory by treating sodium metal with absolute ethanol:

2 CH_{3}CH_{2}OH + 2 Na → 2 CH_{3}CH_{2}ONa + H_{2}

The reaction of sodium hydroxide with anhydrous ethanol suffers from incomplete conversion to the ethoxide, but can still produce dry NaOEt by precipitation using acetone, or by drying using additional NaOH.

== Reactions ==
Sodium ethoxide is commonly used as a base in the Claisen condensation and malonic ester synthesis. Sodium ethoxide may either deprotonate the α-position of an ester molecule, forming an enolate, or the ester molecule may undergo a nucleophilic substitution called transesterification. If the starting material is an ethyl ester, trans-esterification is irrelevant since the product is identical to the starting material. In practice, the alcohol/alkoxide solvating mixture must match the alkoxy components of the reacting esters to minimize the number of different products.

Many alkoxides are prepared by salt metathesis from sodium ethoxide.

== Stability ==
Sodium ethoxide is prone to reaction with both water and carbon dioxide in the air. This leads to degradation of stored samples over time, even in solid form. The physical appearance of degraded samples may not be obvious, but samples of sodium ethoxide gradually turn dark on storage. It has been reported that even newly-obtained commercial batches of sodium ethoxide show variable levels of degradation, and responsible as a major source of irreproducibility when used in Suzuki reactions.

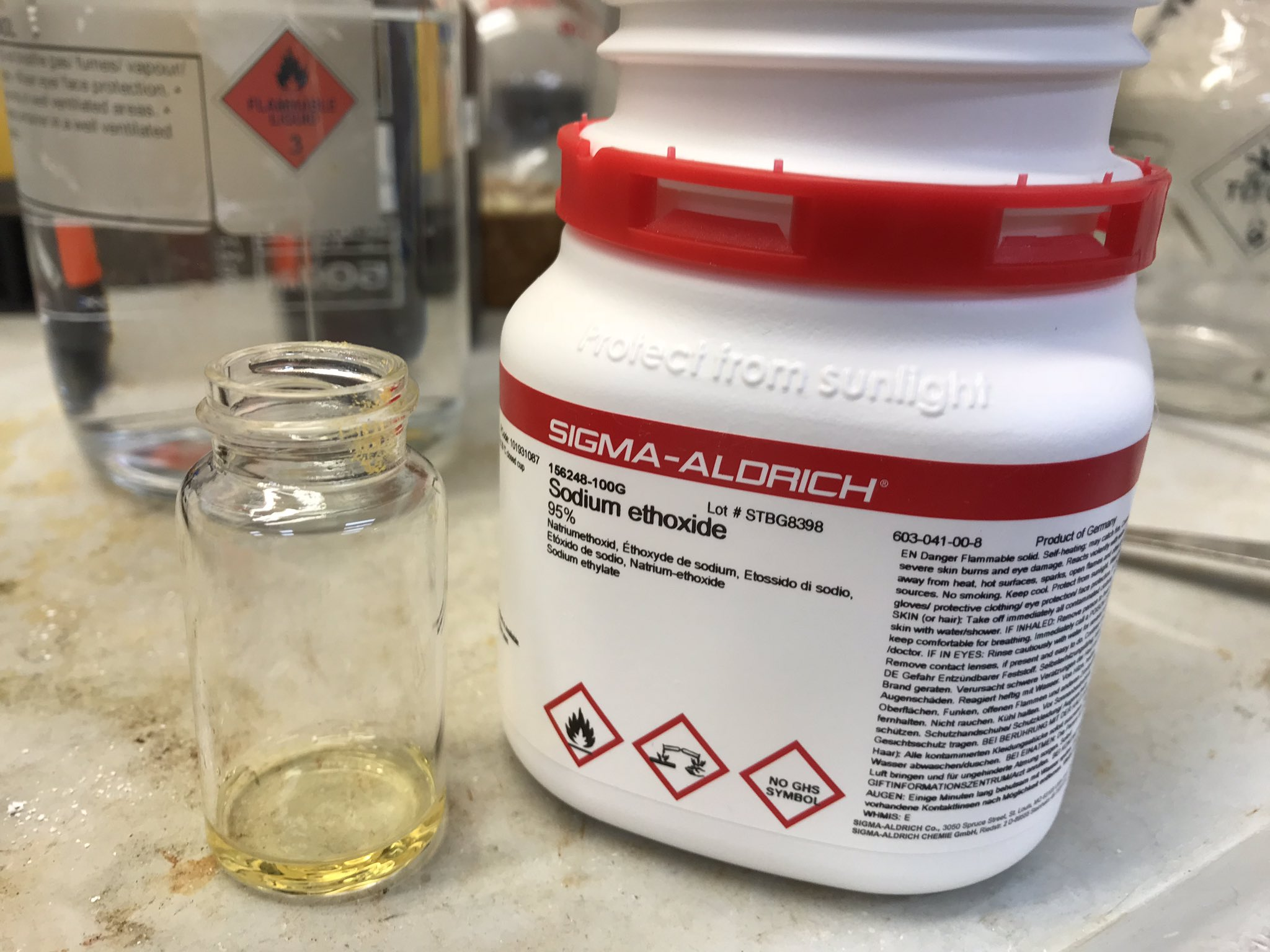
New bottle of sodium ethoxide from Sigma-Aldrich

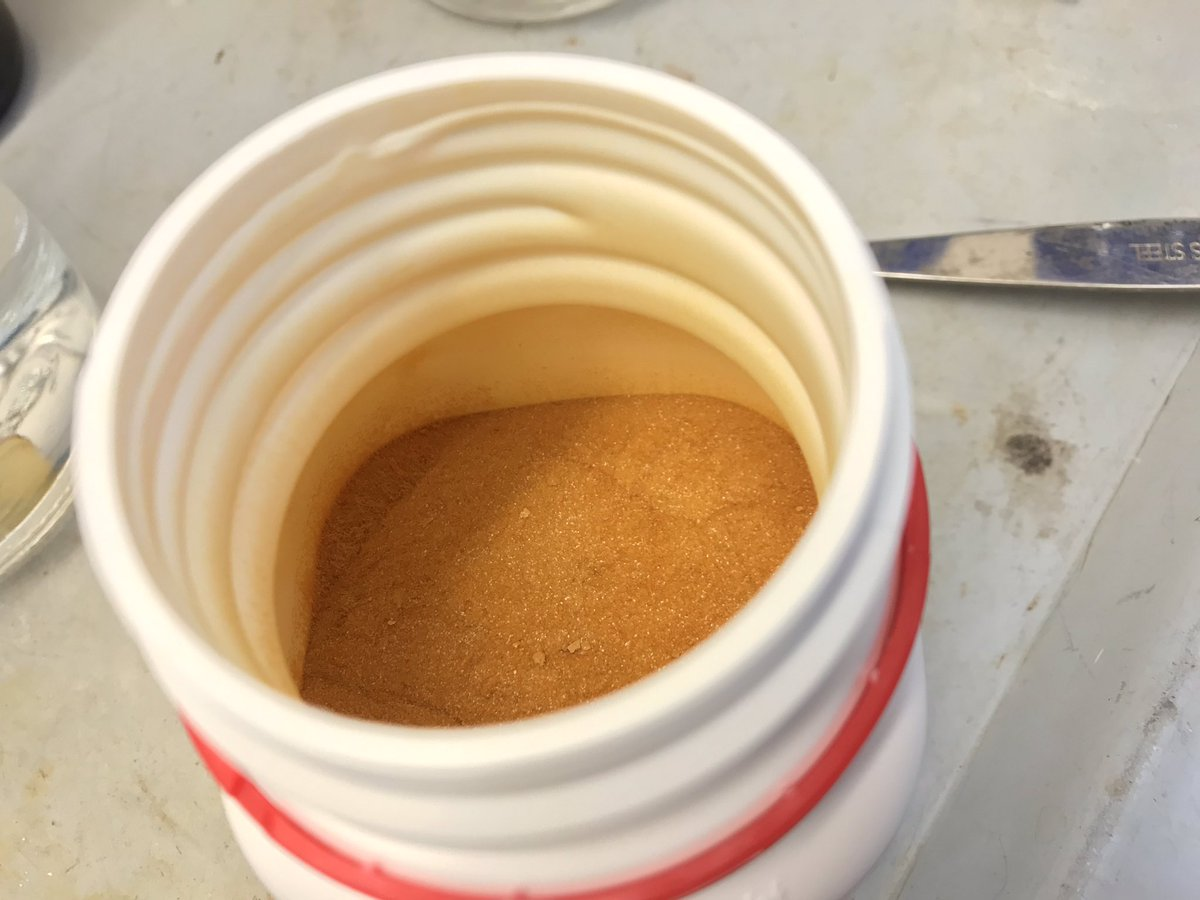
Freshly opened container of sodium ethoxide showing discoloration caused by degradation when stored over oxygen and carbon dioxide.

In moist air, CH_{3}CH_{2}ONa hydrolyses rapidly to sodium hydroxide (NaOH). The conversion is not obvious and typical samples of CH_{3}CH_{2}ONa are contaminated with NaOH.

In moisture-free air, solid sodium ethoxide can form sodium ethyl carbonate from fixation of carbon dioxide from the air. Further reactions lead to degradation into a variety of other sodium salts and diethyl ether.

This instability can be prevented by storing sodium ethoxide under an inert atmosphere (e.g., N_{2}).

== Structure ==
The crystal structure of sodium ethoxide has been determined by X-ray crystallography. It consists of layers of alternating Na^{+} and O^{−} centres with disordered ethyl groups covering the top and bottom of each layer. The ethyl layers pack back-to-back resulting in a lamellar structure. The reaction of sodium and ethanol sometimes forms other products such as the disolvate CH_{3}CH_{2}ONa·2CH_{3}CH_{2}OH. Its crystal structure has been determined, although the structure of other phases in the CH_{3}CH_{2}ONa/CH_{3}CH_{2}OH system remain unknown.

| ball-and-stick model of layer stacking in the crystal structure of CH_{3}CH_{2}ONa | coordination geometry at Na | coordination geometry at O |

== Safety ==
Sodium ethoxide is a strong base, and is therefore corrosive.

== See also ==
- Alkoxide
- Phenolate
- Sodium methoxide
- Sodium phenoxide
- Potassium methoxide
- Potassium ethoxide
