= Azuline =

Type of dye

Azuline is a coal-tar blue dye that became popular for colouring silk in 1861. It was one of the first synthetic dyes. The name was a combination of "azure" and "aniline". A variant of the name was "Azurine". The word was introduced as a colour term about the same time as "mauve" and "magenta", but it has not survived in the English language.

The dye is made from phenol, first oxidising it with oxalic acid and sulfuric acid to make a red substance called rosolic acid. By treating this with ammonia, a dye called red coralline or péonine was made. When reacted with aniline, the blue azuline was produced. This was invented by Jules Persoz in Paris. A company in Lyon called Guinon, Marnas & Bonnet bought the process and established a patent. In 1862 azuline was selling for 450 francs per kilogram.

Chemists at first did not know the structure of the molecules in the coal tar dyes including azuline.

Use of azuline was superseded by aniline blue.

== Properties ==
As a solid, azuline has a metallic appearance with a copper red colour. It hardly dissolves in water, but does dissolve in alcohol. In alcohol it has a strong blue colour, but still has a red tinge. The dye is colourfast, resisting fading by light. Sulfuric acid solution gives a red solution. Iodine destroys the substance. Ammonium sulfide reduces the colour to pale yellowish-brown.
