= Ethane =

Organic compound (H_{3}C–CH_{3})

- Skeletal formula of ethane with all hydrogens and carbons shown Molecular geometry of ethane based on rotational spectroscopy.

- Skeletal formula of ethane with all implicit carbons shown, and all explicit hydrogens added

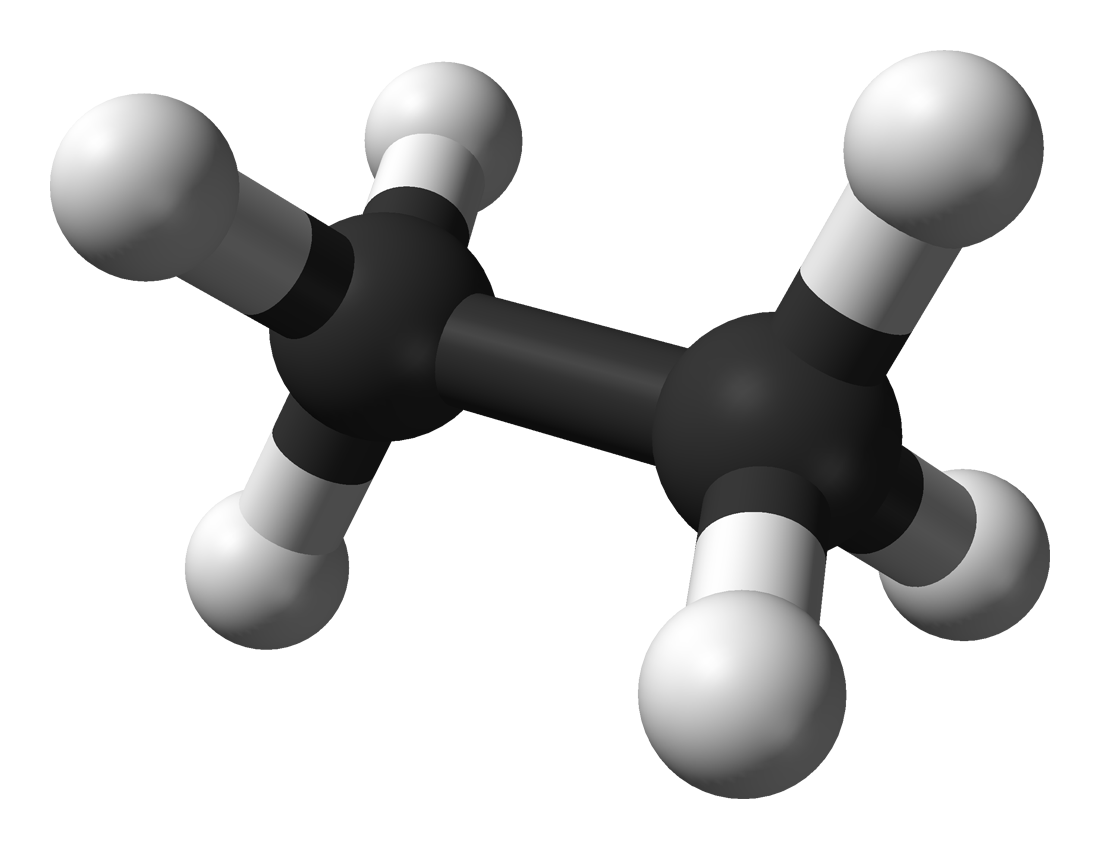
Ball and stick model of ethane
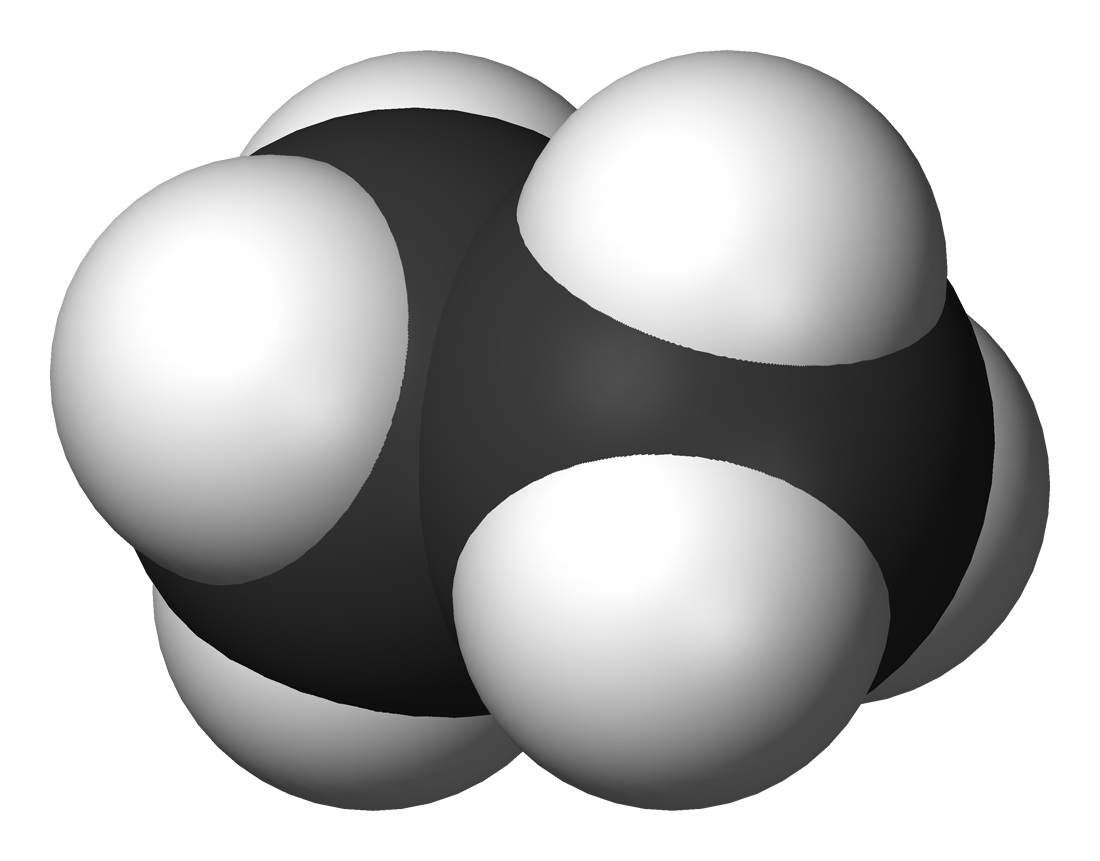
Spacefill model of ethane

Names
- Preferred IUPAC name Ethane
- Systematic IUPAC name Dicarbane (never recommended)
- Other names: Dimethyl (CH_{3}CH_{3}, Me_{2} or (CH_{3})_{2}); Ethyl hydride

Identifiers
| CAS Number | 74-84-0 |
| 3D model (JSmol) | Interactive image |
| Beilstein Reference | 1730716 |
| ChEBI | CHEBI:42266 |
| ChEMBL | ChEMBL135626 |
| ChemSpider | 6084 |
| ECHA InfoCard | 100.000.741 |
| EC Number | 200-814-8 |
| Gmelin Reference | 212 |
| MeSH | Ethane |
| PubChem CID | 6324 |
| RTECS number | KH3800000 |
| UNII | L99N5N533T |
| UN number | 1035 |
| CompTox Dashboard (EPA) | DTXSID6026377 |
- InChI: InChI=1S/C2H6/c1-2/h1-2H3 Key: OTMSDBZUPAUEDD-UHFFFAOYSA-N
- SMILES: CC

Properties
| Chemical formula | C_{2}H_{6} |
| Molar mass | 30.070 g·mol^{−1} |
| Appearance | Colorless gas |
| Odor | Odorless |
| Density | 1.3562 kg/m^{3} (gas at 0 °C); 544.0 kg/m^{3} (liquid at -88.5 °C); 206 kg/m^{3} (at critical point 305.322 K) |
| Melting point | −182.8 °C; −296.9 °F; 90.4 K |
| Boiling point | −88.5 °C; −127.4 °F; 184.6 K |
| Critical point (T, P) | 305.32 K (32.17 °C; 89.91 °F) 48.714 bars (4,871.4 kPa) |
| Solubility in water | 56.8 mg/L |
| Vapor pressure | 3.8453 MPa (at 21.1 °C) |
| Henry's law constant (k_{H}) | 19 nmol Pa^{−1} kg^{−1} |
| Acidity (pK_{a}) | 50 |
| Basicity (pK_{b}) | −36 |
| Conjugate acid | Ethanium |
| Magnetic susceptibility (χ) | −37.37·10^{−6} cm^{3}/mol |

Thermochemistry
| Heat capacity (C) | 52.14± 0.39 J K^{−1} mol^{−1} at 298 Kelvin |
| Std enthalpy of formation (Δ_{f}H^{⦵}_{298}) | −84 kJ mol^{−1} |
| Std enthalpy of combustion (Δ_{c}H^{⦵}_{298}) | −1561.0–−1560.4 kJ mol^{−1} |
| Enthalpy of fusion (Δ_{f}H^{⦵}_{fus}) | 9.76 kJ/mol at −182 °C |
| Enthalpy of vaporization (Δ_{f}H_{vap}) | 14.703 kJ/mol at −89.0 °C |

Hazards
- GHS labelling
| Pictograms | (GHS02: Flammable) (GHS04: Compressed Gas) |
| Signal word | Danger |
| Hazard statements | H220 |
| Precautionary statements | P203, P210, P222, P280, P377, P381, P403 |
| NFPA 704 (fire diamond) | 1 4 0 SA |
| Flash point | −135 °C (−211 °F; 138 K) |
| Autoignition temperature | 472 °C (882 °F; 745 K) |
| Explosive limits | 2.9–13% |
| Safety data sheet (SDS) | inchem.org |

Related compounds
| Related alkanes | Methane; Propane; Butane |
| Related compounds | Disilane; Digermane |

Supplementary data page
- Ethane (data page)
- Except where otherwise noted, data are given for materials in their standard state (at 25 °C [77 °F], 100 kPa). verify (what is ?) Infobox references

Ethane (US: /ˈɛθeɪn/ ETH-ayn, UK: /ˈiːθeɪn/ EE-thayn) is a naturally occurring organic chemical compound with the chemical formula C_{2}H_{6}. At standard temperature and pressure, ethane is a colorless, odorless gas. Natural gas consists of 1–6% ethane by volume, second only to methane. Like many hydrocarbons, ethane is isolated on an industrial scale from natural gas and as a petrochemical by-product of petroleum refining. Its chief use is as feedstock for ethylene production. The ethane molecule adopts an staggered conformation, in which the methyl groups are rotated so that the hydrogen atoms are interleaved, and there is an energy barrier to twisting the methyl groups relative to each other. The ethyl group is formally, although rarely in practice, derived from ethane.

== History ==
Ethane was first synthesised in 1834 by Michael Faraday, applying electrolysis of a potassium acetate solution. He mistook the hydrocarbon product of this reaction for methane and did not investigate it further. The process is now called Kolbe electrolysis:

CH_{3}COO^{−} → CH_{3}• + CO_{2} + e^{−}
CH_{3}• + •CH_{3} → C_{2}H_{6}

During the period 1847–1849, in an effort to vindicate the radical theory of organic chemistry, Hermann Kolbe and Edward Frankland produced ethane by the reductions of propionitrile (ethyl cyanide) and ethyl iodide with potassium metal, and, as did Faraday, by the electrolysis of aqueous acetates. They mistook the product of these reactions for the methyl radical (CH_{3}), of which ethane (C_{2}H_{6}) is a dimer.

This error was corrected in 1864 by Carl Schorlemmer, who showed that the product of all these reactions was in fact ethane. Ethane was discovered dissolved in Pennsylvanian light crude oil by Edmund Ronalds in 1864.

== Properties ==
At standard temperature and pressure, ethane is a colorless, odorless gas. It has a boiling point of −88.5 °C (−127.4 °F; 184.6 K) and melting point of −182.8 °C (−296.9 °F; 90.4 K). Ethane is only very sparingly soluble in water.

The bond parameters of ethane have been measured to high precision by microwave spectroscopy and electron diffraction: r_{C−C} = 1.528(3) Å, r_{C−H} = 1.088(5) Å, and ∠CCH = 111.6(5)° by microwave and r_{C−C} = 1.524(3) Å, r_{C−H} = 1.089(5) Å, and ∠CCH = 111.9(5)° by electron diffraction (the numbers in parentheses represents the uncertainties in the final digits).

=== Rotational barrier ===
Ethane (shown in Newman projection) barrier to rotation about the carbon-carbon bond. The curve is potential energy as a function of rotational angle.

Ethane adopts an staggered conformation, in which the methyl groups are rotated relative to each other so that the hydrogen atoms are interleaved when viewed along the C−C axis. The rotational barrier, the energy barrier for the methyl groups to twist about the C−C bond so as to pass through the eclipsed conformation, is 12 kJ/mol (2.9 kcal/mol). As early as 1890–1891, chemists proposed that ethane molecules preferred the staggered conformation.

Rotating a molecular substructure about a twistable bond usually requires energy. Ethane gives a classic, simple example of such a rotational barrier, sometimes called the "ethane barrier". Among the earliest experimental evidence of this barrier (see diagram at left) was obtained by modelling the entropy of ethane. The three hydrogens at each end are free to pinwheel about the central carbon–carbon bond when provided with sufficient energy to overcome the barrier. The physical origin of the barrier is still not completely settled, although the overlap (exchange) repulsion between the hydrogen atoms on opposing ends of the molecule is perhaps the strongest candidate, with the stabilizing effect of hyperconjugation on the staggered conformation contributing to the phenomenon. Theoretical methods that use an appropriate starting point (orthogonal orbitals) find that hyperconjugation is the most important factor in the origin of the ethane rotation barrier.

=== Solid phases ===
Ethane exists in several solid phases. On cooling at normal pressure, it freezes into phase I, a body-centered cubic structure (space group Im3m). In this form, the positions of the hydrogen atoms are not fixed and the molecules rotate readily around the C−C axis, making it a plastic crystal. In the very narrow temperature range between 89.78 K (−183.37 °C) and 89.68 K (−183.47 °C) it exhibits a metastable state (phase II) that is orthorhombic. In phase II the molecules are orientationally ordered, meaning that the methyl groups do not rotate freely. When cooled further (below 89.68 K), it forms the low-temperature monoclinic phase, phase III (space group P2_{1}/n), which is also orientationally ordered. At room temperature and pressures above 2.46 gigapascals (24,600 bar), it forms phase IV, a tetragonal crystal (space group P4_{2}/mnm).

=== Atmospheric ===
Ethane occurs as a trace gas in the Earth's atmosphere, currently having a concentration at sea level of 0.5 ppb. Global ethane quantities have varied over time, likely due to flaring at natural gas fields. Global ethane emission rates declined from 1984 to 2010, though increased shale gas production at the Bakken formation in the U.S. has arrested the decline by half.

Although ethane is a greenhouse gas, it is much less abundant than methane, has a lifetime of only a few months compared to over a decade, and is less efficient at absorbing radiation relative to mass.

=== Extraterrestrial ===
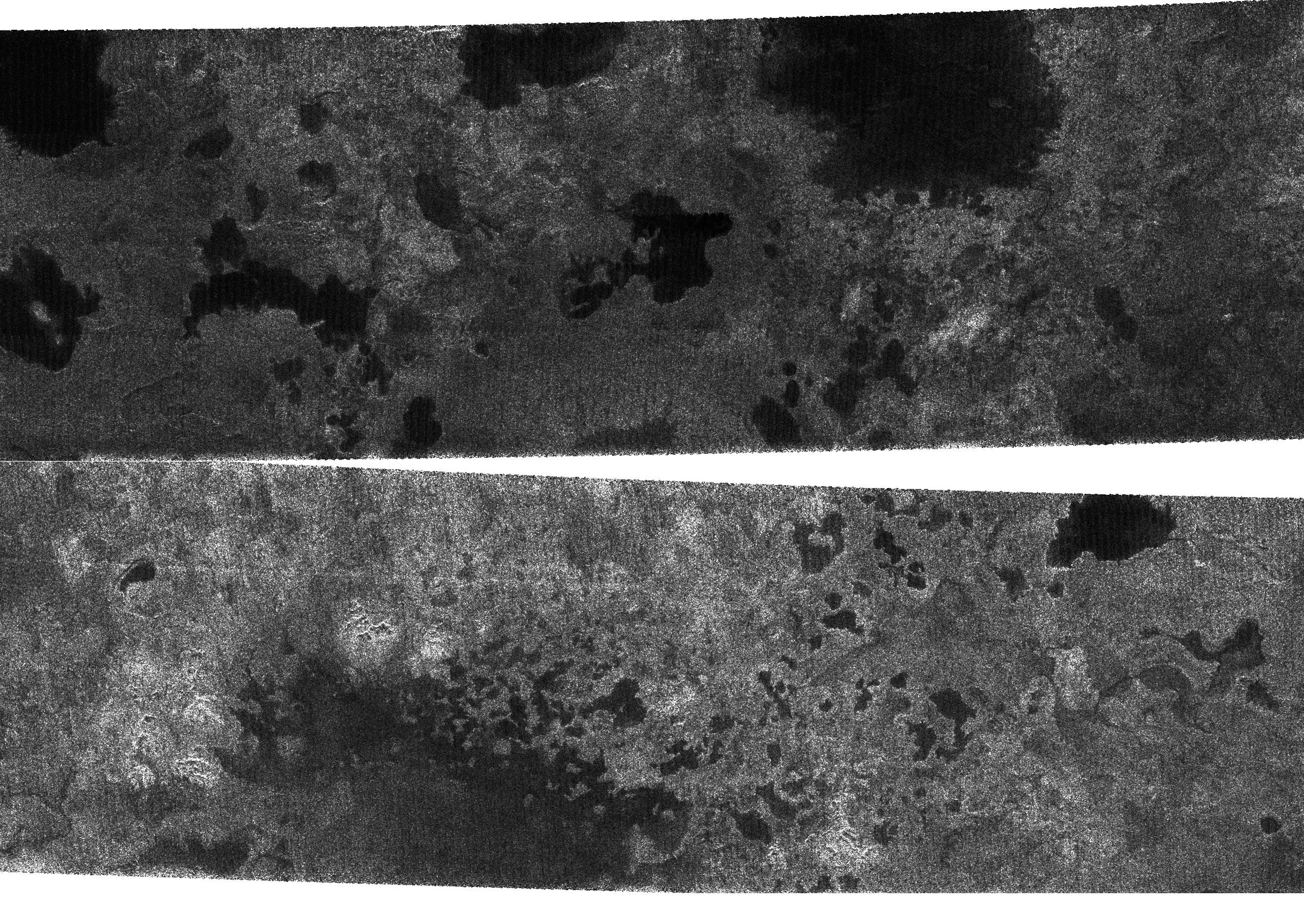
A photograph of Titan's northern latitudes. The dark features are hydrocarbon lakes containing ethane.

Ethane has been detected as a trace component in the atmospheres of all four giant planets, and in the atmosphere of Saturn's moon Titan. Atmospheric ethane results from the Sun's photochemical action on methane gas, which is also present in the atmospheres of these bodies. The conversion from methane to ethane results from ultraviolet photons of wavelengths shorter than 160 nm that photo-dissociate the methane molecule into a methyl radical and a hydrogen atom. When two methyl radicals recombine, the result is ethane:

CH_{4} → CH_{3}• + •H
CH_{3}• + •CH_{3} → C_{2}H_{6}

It is suspected that ethane produced on Titan by photochemical conversion from methane rains back onto the moon's surface, and over time has accumulated into hydrocarbon seas covering much of the moon's polar regions. In mid-2005, the Cassini orbiter discovered Ontario Lacus in Titan's south polar regions. Further analysis of infrared spectroscopic data presented in July 2008 provided additional evidence for the presence of liquid ethane in Ontario Lacus. Several significantly larger hydrocarbon lakes, Ligeia Mare and Kraken Mare being the two largest, were discovered near Titan's north pole using radar data gathered by Cassini. These lakes are believed to be filled primarily by a mixture of liquid ethane and methane. Surface temperatures of Titan are roughly 89–94 K, which is close to the melting points of pure ethane (90.4 K) and pure methane (90.7 K). Ethane and methane form a eutectic mixture at molar fractions of 36% ethane and 64% methane having a melting point of 72 K, which is well below the melting points of either component alone, which may allow these lakes to remain liquid even below 90 K.

In 1996, ethane was detected in Comet Hyakutake, and it has since been detected in some other comets. The existence of ethane in these distant solar system bodies may implicate ethane as a primordial component of the solar nebula from which the sun and planets are believed to have formed.

In 2006, Dale Cruikshank of NASA/Ames Research Center (a New Horizons co-investigator) and his colleagues announced the spectroscopic discovery of ethane on Pluto's surface.

== Chemistry ==
The reactions of ethane involve chiefly free radical reactions. Ethane can react with the halogens, especially chlorine and bromine, by free-radical halogenation. This reaction proceeds through the propagation of the ethyl radical:

Cl_{2} → 2 Cl•
C_{2}H_{6} + Cl• → C_{2}H_{5}• + HCl
C_{2}H_{5}• + Cl_{2} → C_{2}H_{5}Cl + Cl•

The combustion of ethane releases 1559.7 kJ/mol, or 51.9 kJ/g, of heat, and produces carbon dioxide and water according to the chemical equation:

2 C_{2}H_{6} + 7 O_{2} → 4 CO_{2} + 6 H_{2}O + 3120 kJ

Combustion may also occur without an excess of oxygen, yielding carbon monoxide, acetaldehyde, methane, methanol, and ethanol. At higher temperatures, especially in the range 600–900 °C (1,112–1,652 °F), ethylene is a significant product:

2 C_{2}H_{6} + O_{2} → 2 C_{2}H_{4} + 2 H_{2}O

Such oxidative dehydrogenation reactions are relevant to the production of ethylene.

== Production ==
After methane, ethane is the second-largest component of natural gas. Natural gas from different gas fields varies in ethane content from less than 1% to more than 6% by volume. Prior to the 1960s, ethane and larger molecules were typically not separated from the methane component of natural gas, but simply burnt along with the methane as a fuel. Today, ethane is an important petrochemical feedstock and is separated from the other components of natural gas in most well-developed gas fields. Ethane can also be separated from petroleum gas, a mixture of gaseous hydrocarbons produced as a byproduct of petroleum refining.

Ethane is most efficiently separated from methane by liquefying it at cryogenic temperatures. Various refrigeration strategies exist: the most economical process presently in wide use employs a turboexpander, and can recover more than 90% of the ethane in natural gas. In this process, chilled gas is expanded through a turbine, reducing the temperature to approximately −100 °C (−148 °F). At this low temperature, gaseous methane can be separated from the liquefied ethane and heavier hydrocarbons by distillation. Further distillation then separates ethane from the propane and heavier hydrocarbons.

== Usage ==
The chief use of ethane is the production of ethylene (ethene) by steam cracking. Steam cracking of ethane is fairly selective for ethylene, while the steam cracking of heavier hydrocarbons yields a product mixture poorer in ethylene and richer in heavier alkenes (olefins), such as propene (propylene) and butadiene, and in aromatic hydrocarbons.

Ethane has been investigated as a feedstock for other commodity chemicals. Oxidative chlorination of ethane has long appeared to be a potentially more economical route to vinyl chloride than ethylene chlorination. Many patents exist on this theme, but poor selectivity for vinyl chloride and corrosive reaction conditions have discouraged the commercialization of most of them. Presently, Ineos operates a 1000 t/a (tonnes per annum) ethane-to-vinyl chloride pilot plant at Wilhelmshaven in Germany.

SABIC operates a 34,000 t/a plant at Yanbu to produce acetic acid by ethane oxidation. The economic viability of this process may rely on the low cost of ethane near Saudi oil fields, and it may not be competitive with methanol carbonylation elsewhere in the world.

Ethane can be used as a refrigerant in cryogenic refrigeration systems.

=== In the laboratory ===
On a much smaller scale, in scientific research, liquid ethane is used to vitrify water-rich samples for cryo-electron microscopy. A thin film of water quickly immersed in liquid ethane at −150 °C (−238 °F) or colder freezes too quickly for water to crystallize.

== Health and safety ==
At room temperature, ethane is an extremely flammable gas. When mixed with air at 3.0–12.5% by volume, it forms an explosive mixture.

Ethane is not a carcinogen.

== See also ==
- Biogas: carbon-neutral alternative to natural gas
- Biorefining
- Biodegradable plastic
- Drop-in bioplastic
