= Indole-3-carboxylate decarboxylase =

Class of enzymes

Identifiers
- EC no.: 4.1.1.92

Databases
- BRENDA: enzyme data
- ExPASy: NiceZyme view
- KEGG: enzyme entry
- MetaCyc: metabolic pathway
- Rhea: reactions
- PDB structures: RCSB PDB PDBe PDBsum
Search
- PMC: articles
- PubMed: articles
- NCBI: proteins

Indole-3-carboxylate decarboxylase (EC 4.1.1.92) is an enzyme characterised from Arthrobacter nicotianae with systematic name indole-3-carboxylate carboxy-lyase. It catalyses the decarboxylation of indole-3-carboxylic acid to indole and carbon dioxide. It can also perform carboxylation in the reverse direction, which is analogous to the Kolbe–Schmitt reaction.

indole-3-carboxylic acid
CO_{2}
CO_{2}
indole

The enzyme is activated by zinc, manganese or magnesium as Zn^{2+}, Mn^{2+} or Mg^{2+} respectively. Biosynthetic pathways involving this enzyme have been suggested for the sustainable production of aromatic derivatives.
