= Aurin =

- Skeletal formula of aurin

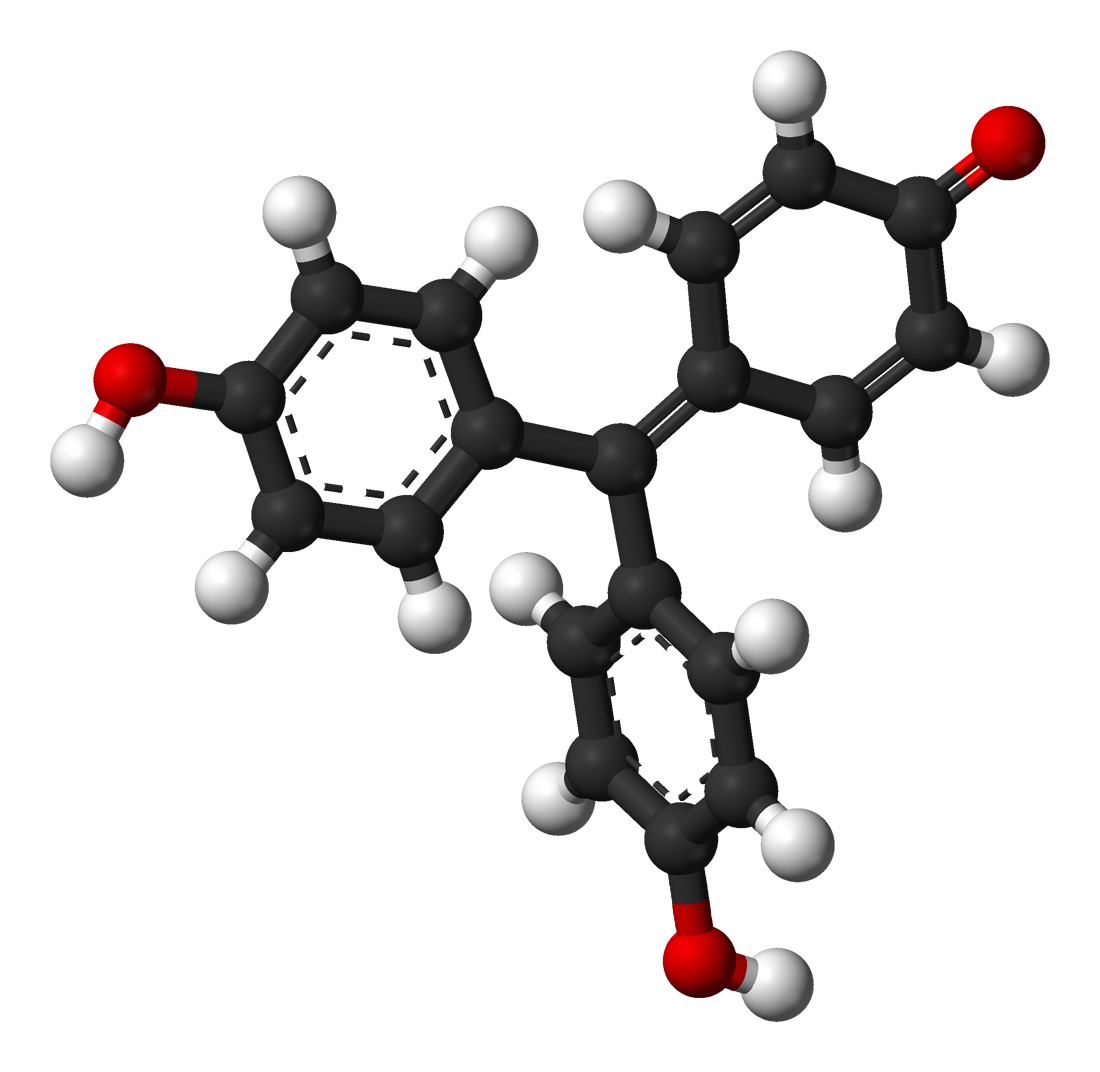
- Ball-and-stick model

Names
- Preferred IUPAC name 4-[Bis(4-hydroxyphenyl)methylidene]cyclohexa-2,5-dien-1-one
- Other names: Aurin; Corallin; p-rosolic acid; C.I. 43800

Identifiers
CAS Number	603-45-2
3D model (JSmol)	Interactive image
Beilstein Reference	2055205
ChEMBL	ChEMBL210868
ChemSpider	4921
ECHA InfoCard	100.009.129
EC Number	210-041-8
PubChem CID	5100
UNII	85N4AK3JAU
CompTox Dashboard (EPA)	DTXSID2022387
- InChI: InChI=1S/C19H14O3/c20-16-7-1-13(2-8-16)19(14-3-9-17(21)10-4-14)15-5-11-18(22)12-6-15/h1-12,20-21H Key: FYEHYMARPSSOBO-UHFFFAOYSA-N; InChI=1/C19H14O3/c20-16-7-1-13(2-8-16)19(14-3-9-17(21)10-4-14)15-5-11-18(22)12-6-15/h1-12,20-21H Key: FYEHYMARPSSOBO-UHFFFAOYAG
- SMILES: C1=CC(=O)C=CC1=C(C2=CC=C(C=C2)O)C3=CC=C(C=C3)O

Properties
Chemical formula	C_{19}H_{14}O_{3}
Molar mass	290.318 g·mol^{−1}
Appearance	see text
Density	1.283 g/cm^{3}
Melting point	308 °C (586 °F; 581 K) (decomposes)
Solubility in water	Insoluble
UV-vis (λ_{max})	482 nm
Magnetic susceptibility (χ)	−161.4·10^{−6} cm^{3}/mol

Hazards
- GHS labelling
Pictograms	(GHS07: Exclamation mark)
Signal word	Danger
Hazard statements	H315, H319, H335
Precautionary statements	P261, P305+P351+P338
NFPA 704 (fire diamond)	1 1 0
- Except where otherwise noted, data are given for materials in their standard state (at 25 °C [77 °F], 100 kPa). verify (what is ?) Infobox references

Aurin (C.I. 43800), sometimes named rosolic acid or corallin is an organic compound, forming yellowish or deep-red crystals with greenish metallic luster. It is practically insoluble in water, freely soluble in alcohol. It is soluble in strong acids to form yellow solution, or in aqueous alkalis to form carmine red solutions.

Aurin (pH indicator)
below pH 5.0		above pH 6.8
(yellow) 5.0	⇌	6.8 (carmine)

Due to this behaviour it can be used as pH indicator with pH transition range 5.0 - 6.8. It is used as an intermediate in manufacturing of dyes.

== Synthesis ==
Aurin was first prepared in 1834 by the German chemist Friedlieb Ferdinand Runge, who obtained it by distilling coal tar. He named it Rosölsäure or Rosaölsäure (red oil acid). In 1861, the German chemists Hermann Kolbe and Rudolf Schmitt presented the synthesis of aurin by heating oxalic acid and creosote (which contains phenol) in the presence of concentrated sulfuric acid. (Gradually, chemists realized that commercial aurin was not a pure compound, but was actually a mixture of similar compounds.)

Aurin is formed by heating of phenol and oxalic acid in concentrated sulfuric acid.

== Safety ==
Aurin may cause eye, skin, and respiratory tract irritation. Ingestion and inhalation should be avoided.

Aurin was reported to have endocrine disruptor chemical (EDC) properties.
