= Ethane (data page) =

Chemical data page

This page provides supplementary chemical data on ethane.

== Material Safety Data Sheet ==
The handling of this chemical may incur notable safety precautions. It is highly recommended that you seek the Material Safety Datasheet (MSDS) for this chemical from a reliable source such as SIRI, and follow its directions.

== Structure and properties ==
Structure and properties
Surface tension	21.16 dyn/cm at −119.9 °C

== Thermodynamic properties ==
Phase behavior
Triple point	91 K (−182 °C), 1.1 Pa
Std entropy change of fusion, Δ_{fus}S^{~~o~~}	6.46 J/(mol·K) at −182 °C
Std enthalpy change of vaporization, Δ_{vap}H^{~~o~~} crystal I → liquid	14.703 kJ/mol at −89.0 °C
Std entropy change of vaporization, Δ_{vap}S^{~~o~~} crystal I → liquid	79.87 J/(mol·K) at −89.0 °C
Std enthalpy change of state transition, Δ_{trs}H^{~~o~~} crystal II → crystal I	2.282 kJ/mol at −183.3 °C
Std entropy change of state transition, Δ_{trs}S^{~~o~~} crystal II → crystal I	25.48 kJ/mol at −183.3 °C
Solid properties
Std enthalpy change of formation, Δ_{f}H^{~~o~~}_{solid}	? kJ/mol
Standard molar entropy, S^{~~o~~}_{solid}	? J/(mol K)
Heat capacity, c_{p}	? J/(mol K)
Liquid properties
Std enthalpy change of formation, Δ_{f}H^{~~o~~}_{liquid}	? kJ/mol
Standard molar entropy, S^{~~o~~}_{liquid}	126.7 J/(mol K)
Heat capacity, c_{p}	68.5 J/(mol K) at −179 °C
Gas properties
Std enthalpy change of formation, Δ_{f}H^{~~o~~}_{gas}	−83.8 kJ/mol
Standard molar entropy, S^{~~o~~}_{gas}	229.6 J/(mol K)
Enthalpy of combustion, Δ_{c}H^{~~o~~}	−1560.7 kJ/mol
Heat capacity, c_{p}	52.49 J/(mol K) at 25 °C
van der Waals' constants	a = 556.2 L^{2} kPa/mol^{2} b = 0.06380 L/mol

== Vapor pressure of liquid ==
P in mm Hg	1	10	40	100	400	760	1520	3800	7600	15200	30400	45600
T in °C	−159.5	−142.9	−129.8	−119.3	−99.6	−88.6	−75.0	−52.8	−32.0	−6.4	23.6	—

Table data obtained from CRC Handbook of Chemistry and Physics 44th ed.

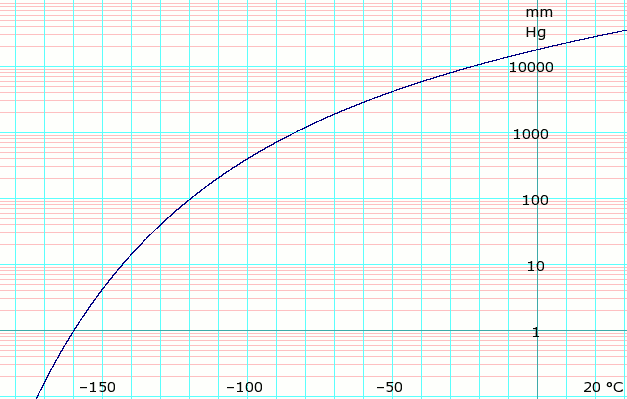
Ethane vapor pressure vs. temperature. Uses formula $\ln P_\text{mm Hg} =$$\ln\frac{760}{101.325} - 5.381564 \ln T - \frac{2626.728}{T} + 46.39131 + 1.601858 \times 10^{-05} T^2$ (with T in kelvins) obtained from CHERIC

== Melting point data ==
Mean value for acceptable data: −183.01 °C (90.14 K).

Sources used, from ONS Open Melting Point Collection:

- −183.33 °C
- −182.85 °C from CHERIC
- −182.78 °C
- −182.79 °C from PHYSPROP
- −183.28 °C

Values considered "outliers", not included in averaging:

- −172 °C from Oxford MSDS
- −172.15 °C
