= Rudolf Schmitt =

German chemist (1830–1898)

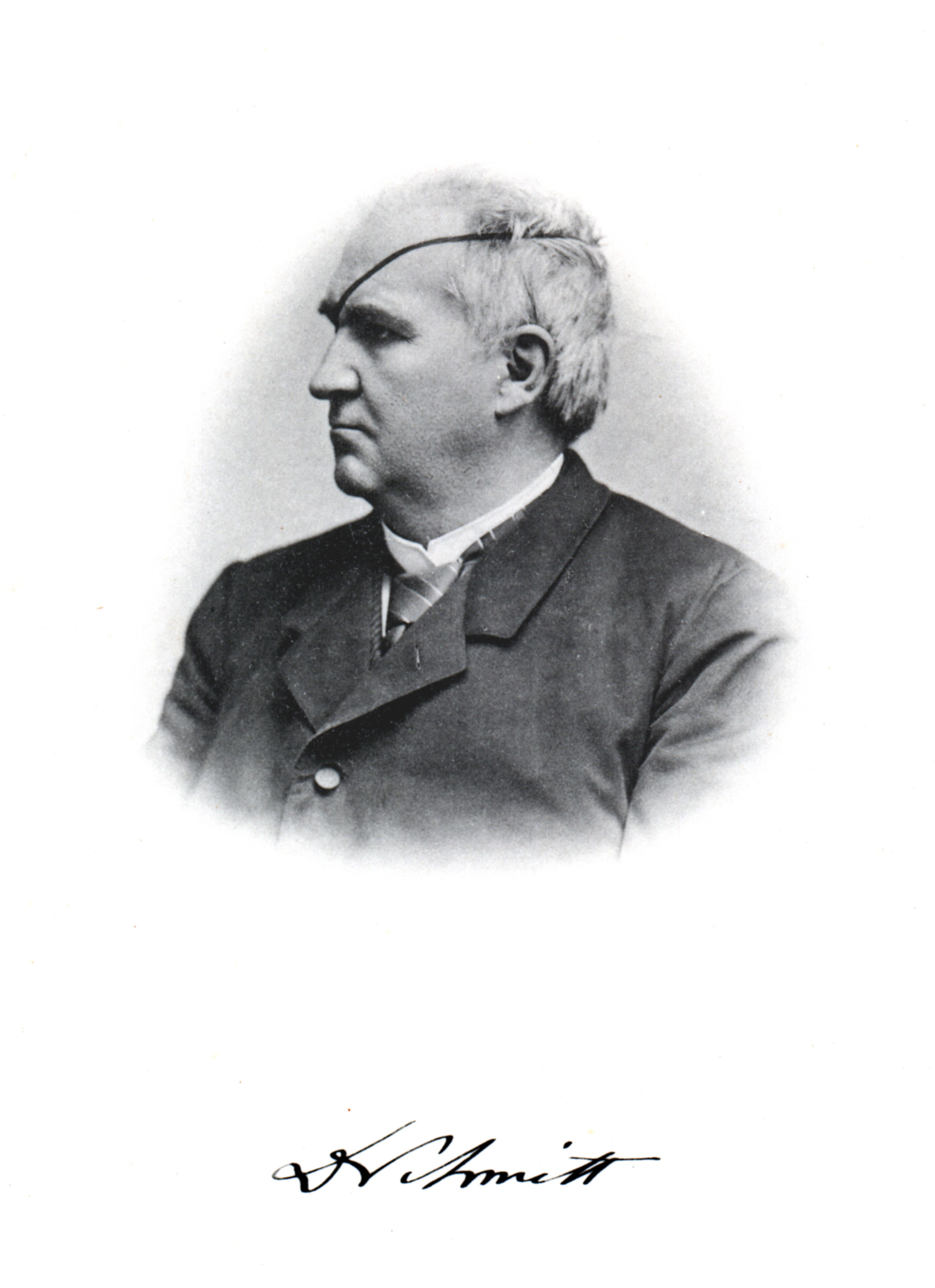
- Rudolf Schmitt
- Born: August 5, 1830; Wippershain, Electorate of Hesse
- Died: February 18, 1898 (aged 67); Radebeul, Kingdom of Saxony
- Education: University of Marburg
- Known for: Kolbe-Schmitt reaction
- Scientific career
- Workplaces: Dresden University of Technology
- Doctoral advisor: Adolph Wilhelm Hermann Kolbe
- Doctoral students: Richard Seifert

Rudolf Schmitt (August 5, 1830 – February 18, 1898) was a German chemist who together with Adolph Wilhelm Hermann Kolbe discovered the Kolbe-Schmitt reaction.

== Biography ==
Schmitt was born in the small village Wippershain in the Hesse-Kassel as the second of eight siblings as son of a preacher. He moved several times during his childhood and entered the Gymnasium as boarding pupil in Marburg. He received his Abitur in 1853 and entered the University of Marburg the same year. He started studying mathematics, theology and chemistry, but later concentrated on chemistry. After 8 Semesters he joined Hermann Fehling at the University of Stuttgart but returned to work with Adolph Kolbe in 1857.

For his work on Sulfanilic acid he received his PhD in 1861 and for his work on Salicylic acid he received his habilitation in 1863.

He worked at the University of Kassel and later the commercial school in Nuremberg. Due to an explosion of a glass tube filled with hydrogen sulfide he lost his right eye in 1869.

He spent most of his academic career at the Dresden University of Technology which was promoted from to a Polytechnicum and in 1890 to a Technische Hochschule during his stay. He was elected Director of the University in 1891, but had to renounce due to his bad health. He stopped teaching in 1893 for the same reason. Schmitt died at his house in Radebeul in 1898.
