= Peter Griess =

German chemist who discovered the diazotization reaction (1829–1888)

Johann Peter Griess
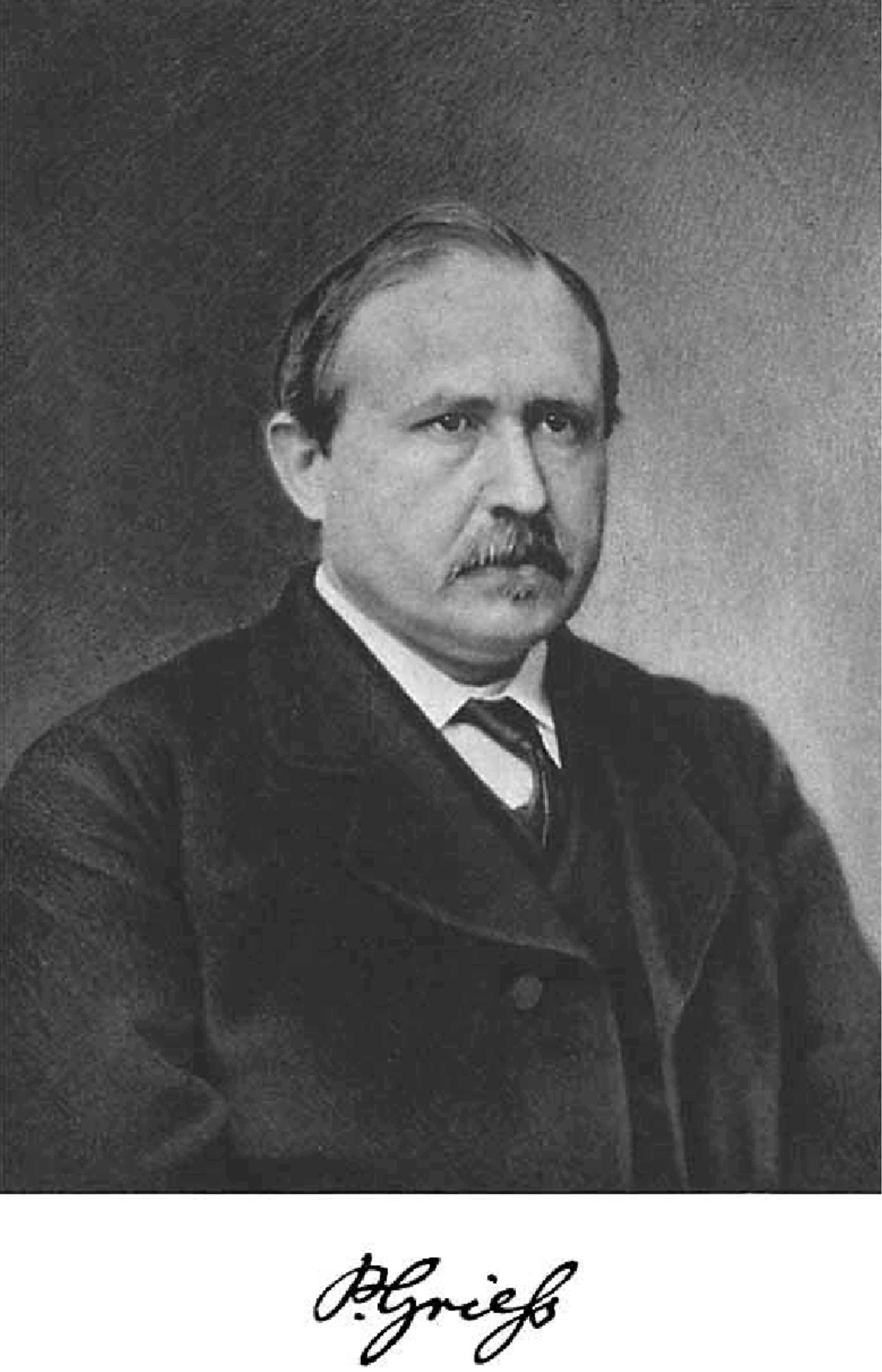
- Born: 6 September 1829; Kirchhosbach (now part of Waldkappel), Germany
- Died: 30 August 1888 (aged 58); Bournemouth, England
- Education: Marburg University
- Known for: diazotization reaction
- Scientific career
- Fields: Chemist
- Workplaces: Marburg University; Royal College of Chemistry
- Doctoral advisor: Hermann Kolbe, August Wilhelm von Hofmann

Johann Peter Griess (6 September 1829 – 30 August 1888) was an industrial chemist and a pioneer of organic chemistry. Griess was influential in the development of the dye industry. He discovered the diazotization reaction and subsequently discovered azo coupling. The resulting azo dyes comprise about 50% of synthetic dyes.

== Life ==
After he finished at an agricultural private school, he joined the Hessian cavalry, but left the military shortly after. He started his studies at the University of Jena in 1850, but changed to Marburg University in 1851. During his student life he was several times sentenced to the Karzer (campus jail) and was also banned from the city for one year, during which time he listened to lectures of Justus Liebig at the Ludwig-Maximilians-Universität München.

After most of the family possession had been spent, Griess had to start working at the chemical factory of Oehler in Offenbach am Main in 1856. This was only possible after the recommendation of Hermann Kolbe, who was head of the chemistry department in Marburg. The devastating fire of 1857 ended the production of chemicals at the factory and a changed Peter Griess rejoined Hermann Kolbe at Marburg University. His new enthusiasm for chemistry yielded the discovery of diazonium salts in 1858. The discovery of a new class of chemicals convinced August Wilhelm von Hofmann to invite Griess to join him at his new position at the Royal College of Chemistry. During his time at the Royal College, he studied the reactions of nitrogen-rich organic molecules. It took him quite long to become accustomed to his new home in England, but the fact that he married in 1869 and founded a family made it clear that he did not intend to return to Germany, even though he was offered a position at the BASF. He left and started a position at the Samuel Allsopp & Sons brewery in 1862 where he worked until his retirement. His wife died after a long, severe illness in 1886; he survived her for two years and died on August 30, 1888. He is buried in Burton upon Trent.

== Work ==
In 1858, he described the Griess diazotization reaction which would form the basis for the Griess test for detection of Nitrite. Most of his work related to brewing remained confidential, but his additional work on organic chemistry was published by him in several articles.

== See also ==
- Carl Alexander von Martius
- William Christopher Zeise
