= Kolbe electrolysis =

Organic reaction

The Kolbe electrolysis or Kolbe reaction is an organic reaction named after Hermann Kolbe. The Kolbe reaction is formally a decarboxylative dimerisation of two carboxylic acids (or carboxylate ions). The overall reaction is:

== Mechanism and side-reactions ==
The reaction mechanism involves a two-stage radical process: electrochemical oxidation first gives an alkylcarboxyl radical, which decarboxylates almost immediately to give an alkyl radical intermediate. The alkyl radicals which combine to form a covalent bond. As an example, electrolysis of acetic acid yields ethane and carbon dioxide:

CH_{3}COOH → CH_{3}COO^{−} → CH_{3}COO· → CH_{3}· + CO_{2}
2CH_{3}· → CH_{3}CH_{3}

Another example is the synthesis of 2,7-dimethyl-2,7-dinitrooctane from 4-methyl-4-nitrovaleric acid:

Other compounds can trap the radicals formed by decarboxylation, and the Kolbe reaction has also been occasionally used in cross-coupling reactions. If a mixture of two different carboxylates are used, the radical cross-coupling reaction generally gives all combinations of them:

R_{1}COO^{−} + R_{2}COO^{−} → R_{1}−R_{1} and/or R_{1}−R_{2} and/or R_{2}−R_{2}

The reaction process can be enhanced and the Hofer–Moest reaction alternative suppressed, by performing the reaction under weakly acidic conditions in protic solvents, and using a high current density and a platinum anodic electrode.

In 2022, it was discovered that the Kolbe electrolysis is enhanced if an alternating square wave current is used instead of a direct current.

=== Hofer–Moest reaction ===
In the Hofer–Moest reaction, the alkyl radical undergo further oxidation to form a carbocation, rather than coupling with another alkyl radical, which then reacts with an available nucleophile. The Hofer–Moest reaction, rather than Kolbe radical-coupling, always occurs if the carboxylic acid bears a carbocation-stabilizing side-substituent at the α position, but only sometimes otherwise.

== Applications ==
Kolbe electrolysis has a few industrial applications. The reaction typically yields <50%.

In one example, sebacic acid has been produced commercially by Kolbe electrolysis of adipic acid.

Kolbe electrolysis has been examined for converting biomass into biodiesel and for grafting of carbon electrodes.

== See also ==
- Electrosynthesis
- Wurtz reaction
- Hunsdiecker reaction
