= Phenolates =

Salts or other derivatives of phenols

Structural formula of the phenolate ion

Phenolates (also called phenoxides) are anions, salts, and esters of phenols, containing the phenolate ion. They may be formed by reaction of phenols with strong base.

== Properties ==
Alkali metal phenolates, such as sodium phenolate hydrolyze in aqueous solution to form basic solutions. At pH = 10, phenol and phenolate are in approximately 1:1 proportions.

The phenoxide anion (aka phenolate) is a strong nucleophile with a comparable to the one of carbanions or tertiary amines. Generally, oxygen attack of phenoxide anions is kinetically favored, while carbon-attack is thermodynamically preferred (see Thermodynamic versus kinetic reaction control). Mixed oxygen/carbon attack and by this a loss of selectivity is usually observed if the reaction rate reaches diffusion control.

== Uses ==
Alkyl aryl ethers can be synthesized through the Williamson ether synthesis by treating sodium phenolate with an alkyl halide:

C_{6}H_{5}ONa + CH_{3}I → C_{6}H_{5}OCH_{3} + NaI
C_{6}H_{5}ONa + (CH_{3}O)_{2}SO_{2} → C_{6}H_{5}OCH_{3} + (CH_{3}O)SO_{3}Na

=== Production of salicylic acid ===
Salicylic acid is produced in the Kolbe–Schmitt reaction between carbon dioxide and sodium phenolate.

== See also ==
- Sodium phenolate
