= Constantin Fahlberg =

Russian chemist (1850–1910)

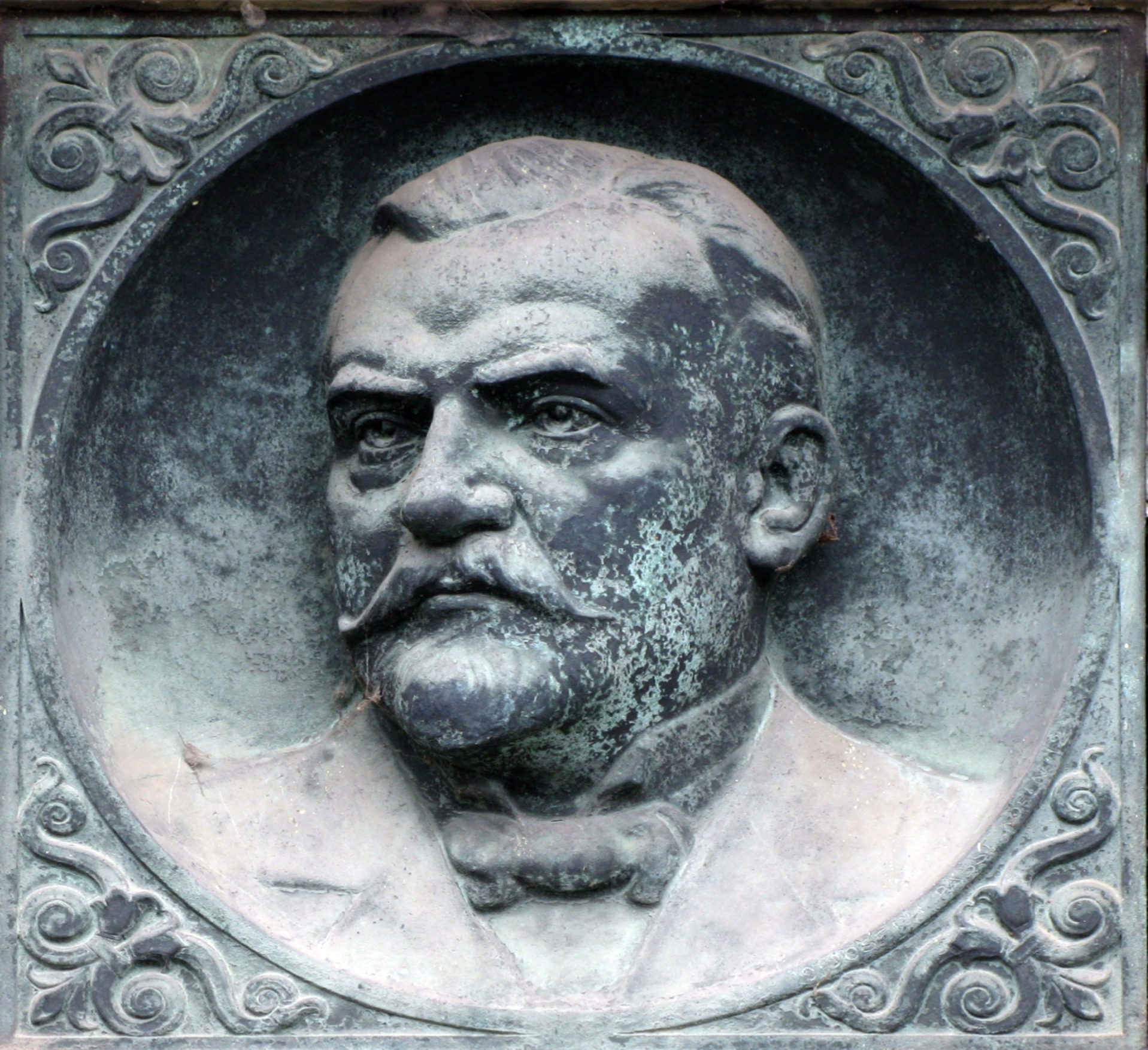
Cenotaph for Constantin Fahlberg in Magdeburg, Germany

Signature of Constantin Fahlberg

Constantin Fahlberg (Russian: Константин Фальберг; 22 December 1850 in Tambov – 15 August 1910 in Nassau) was a Russian chemist who discovered the sweet taste of anhydroorthosulphaminebenzoic acid in 1877–78 when analysing the chemical compounds in coal tar at Johns Hopkins University for Professor Ira Remsen (1846–1927, aged 81). Later Fahlberg gave this chemical "body" the trade name Saccharin.
