= Maxwell Simpson =

Irish chemist (1815-1902)

Maxwell Simpson (15 March 1815 – 26 February 1902) was an eminent Irish chemist.

== Life ==
He was born in Beach Hill, County Armagh, Ireland, son of Thomas Simpson. He attended Dr. Henderson's school at Newry before continuing to Trinity College, Dublin in 1832. He graduated in 1837 and travelled on the continent. After attending a lecture in Paris by Dumas on chemistry he decided to study that subject, which he did at University College, London.

In 1847 he became lecturer in chemistry at the Park Street Medical School (later Ledwich School of Medicine) in Dublin. Upon closure of that school he lectured at the Peter St. School of Medicine. He then took three years leave of absence in order to study in Germany, returned to Dublin in 1854, spent two further years in Paris and returned again in 1860. At this point he built a laboratory in his Dublin home in which he worked for the next seven years. During this early part of his life he had started making the discoveries that placed him in the first rank of chemists of his time. These included improvements in the determination of nitrogen in organic compounds, determination of the structure of polyhydric alcohols and the synthesis of Succinic and other acids from the corresponding cyanides.

He was elected a Fellow of the Royal Society in June 1862.

In 1872 he was appointed Professor of Chemistry at Queen's College, Cork, a position he held until his retirement in 1892.

He married Mary Martin, daughter of Samuel Martin of Loughorne, County Down. He died in London in 1902 and was buried at Fulham cemetery.
