= Hermann Kolbe =

German chemist (1818–1884)

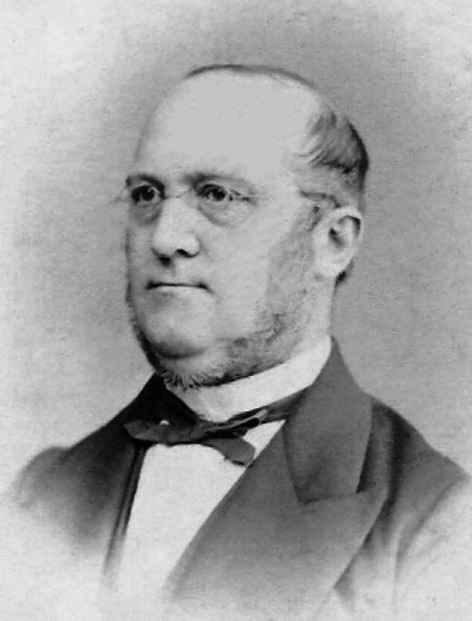
- Kolbe, c. 1860
- Born: Adolph Wilhelm Hermann Kolbe; 27 September 1818; Elliehausen, Kingdom of Hanover
- Died: 25 November 1884 (aged 66); Leipzig, Kingdom of Saxony, German Empire
- Education: University of Marburg
- Known for: Kolbe electrolysis, Kolbe–Schmitt reaction Kolbe nitrile synthesis
- Awards: Davy Medal (1884)
- Scientific career
- Fields: Chemist
- Workplaces: University of Marburg; University of Leipzig
- Doctoral advisor: Robert Bunsen; Friedrich Wöhler
- Doctoral students: Peter Griess; Aleksandr Mikhailovich Zaitsev; Theodor Curtius; Ernst Otto Beckmann; Carl Graebe; Oscar Loew; Constantin Fahlberg; Nikolai Menshutkin; Vladimir Markovnikov; Jacob Volhard; Ludwig Mond; Alexander Crum Brown; Maxwell Simpson; Frederick Guthrie [Note, not primary advisor for all in this list]

Adolph Wilhelm Hermann Kolbe (27 September 1818 – 25 November 1884) was a German chemist and academic, and a major contributor to the birth of modern organic chemistry. He was a professor at Marburg and Leipzig. Kolbe was the first to apply the term synthesis in a chemical context, and contributed to the philosophical demise of vitalism through synthesis of the organic substance acetic acid from carbon disulfide, and also contributed to the development of structural theory. This was done via modifications to the idea of "radicals" and accurate prediction of the existence of secondary and tertiary alcohols, and to the emerging array of organic reactions through his Kolbe electrolysis of carboxylate salts, the Kolbe-Schmitt reaction in the preparation of aspirin and the Kolbe nitrile synthesis. After studies with Wöhler and Bunsen, Kolbe was involved with the early internationalization of chemistry through work in London (with Frankland). He was elected to the Royal Swedish Academy of Sciences, and won the Royal Society of London's Davy Medal in the year of his death. Despite these accomplishments and his training important members of the next generation of chemists (including Zaitsev, Curtius, Beckmann, Graebe, Markovnikov, and others), Kolbe is best remembered for editing the Journal für Praktische Chemie for more than a decade, in which his vituperative essays on Kekulé's structure of benzene, van't Hoff's theory on the origin of chirality and Baeyer's reforms of nomenclature were personally critical and linguistically violent. Kolbe died of a heart attack in Leipzig at age 66, six years after the death of his wife, Charlotte.

== Life ==
Kolbe was born in Elliehausen, near Göttingen, Kingdom of Hanover (Germany) as the eldest son of a Protestant pastor. At the age of 13, he entered the Göttingen Gymnasium, residing at the home of one of the professors. He obtained the leaving certificate (the Abitur) six years later. He had become passionate about the study of chemistry, matriculating at the University of Göttingen in the spring of 1838 in order to study with the famous chemist Friedrich Wöhler.

In 1842, he became an assistant to Robert Bunsen at the Philipps-Universität Marburg. He took his doctoral degree in 1843 at the same university. A new opportunity arose in 1845, when he became assistant to Lyon Playfair at the new Museum of Economic Geology in London and a close friend of Edward Frankland. From 1847, he was engaged in editing the Handwörterbuch der reinen und angewandten Chemie (Dictionary of Pure and Applied Chemistry) edited by Justus von Liebig, Wöhler, and Johann Christian Poggendorff, and he also wrote an important textbook. In 1851, Kolbe succeeded Bunsen as professor of chemistry at Marburg and, in 1865, he was called to the Universität Leipzig. In 1864, he was elected a foreign member of the Royal Swedish Academy of Sciences. He was elected as a member of the American Philosophical Society in 1874.

In 1853, he married Charlotte, the daughter of General-Major Wilhelm von Bardeleben. His wife died in 1876 after 23 years of happy marriage. They had four children.

== Work in chemical research ==
As late as the 1840s, and despite Friedrich Wöhler's synthesis of urea in 1828, some chemists still believed in the doctrine of vitalism, according to which a special life-force was necessary to create "organic" (i.e., in its original meaning, biologically derived) compounds. Kolbe promoted the idea that organic compounds could be derived from substances clearly sourced from outside this "organic" context, directly or indirectly, by substitution processes. (Hence, while by modern definitions, he was converting one organic molecule to another, by the parlance of his era, he was converting "inorganic"—anorganisch—substances into "organic" ones only thought accessible through vital processes.) He validated his theory by converting carbon disulfide (CS_{2}) to acetic acid (CH_{3}COOH) in several steps (1843–45). Kolbe also introduced a modified idea of structural radicals, so contributing to the development of structural theory. A dramatic success came when his theoretical prediction of the existence of secondary and tertiary alcohols was confirmed by the synthesis of the first of these classes of organic molecules. Kolbe was the first person to use the word synthesis in its present-day meaning, and contributed a number of new chemical reactions.

In particular, Kolbe developed procedures for the electrolysis of the salts of fatty and other carboxylic acids (Kolbe electrolysis) and prepared salicylic acid, a building block of aspirin in a process called Kolbe synthesis or Kolbe-Schmitt reaction. His method for the synthesis of nitriles is called the Kolbe nitrile synthesis, and with Edward Frankland he found that nitriles can be hydrolyzed to the corresponding acids. In addition to his own bench research and scholarly and editorial work, Kolbe oversaw student research at Leipzig and especially at Marburg; students spending time under his tutelage included Peter Griess, Aleksandr Mikhailovich Zaitsev (known for Zaitsev's rule predicting the product composition of elimination reactions), Theodor Curtius (discoverer of diazo compounds, hydrazines, and the Curtius rearrangement), Ernst Otto Beckmann (discoverer of the Beckmann rearrangement), Carl Graebe (discoverer of alizarin), Oscar Loew, Constantin Fahlberg, Nikolai Menshutkin, Vladimir Markovnikov (first to describe carbocycles smaller and larger than cyclohexane, and known for Markovnikov's rule describing addition reactions to alkenes), Jacob Volhard, Ludwig Mond, Alexander Crum Brown (first to describe the double bond of ethylene), Maxwell Simpson, and Frederick Guthrie.

== Work as journal editor ==
Besides his work for periodicals, he wrote numerous books. Kolbe served for more than a decade as what, in modern terms, would be understood the senior editor of the Journal für Praktische Chemie (Journal of practical chemistry, from 1870 to 1884), Kolbe was sometimes so severely critical of the work of others, especially after about 1874, that some wondered whether he might have been suffering a mental illness. He was intolerant of what he regarded as loose speculation parading as theory, and sought through his writings to save his beloved science of chemistry from what he regarded as the scourge of modern structural theory.

His rejection of structural chemistry, especially the theories of the structure of benzene by August Kekulé, the theory of the asymmetric carbon atom by J. H. van't Hoff, and the reform of chemical nomenclature by Adolf von Baeyer, was expressed in his vituperative articles in the Journal für Praktische Chemie. Some translated quotes illustrate his manner of articulating the deep conflict between his interpretation of chemistry and that of the structural chemists:

Baeyer is an excellent experimentor, but he is only an empiricist, lacking sense and capability, and his interpretations of his experiments show particular deficiency in his familiarity with the principles of true science.

The violence of his language worked to limit his posthumous reputation.

== Publications ==
- Untersuchungen über die Elektrolyse organischer Verbindungen. Edinburgh: Livingstone. 1947.

== Sources ==
- Rocke, Alan J. (1993). The Quiet Revolution: Hermann Kolbe and the Science of Organic Chemistry. University of California Press. ISBN 978-0-520-08110-9.
- von Meyer, E. (1884). "Zur Erinnerung an Hermann Kolbe". Journal für Praktische Chemie. 30 (1): 417–467. doi:10.1002/prac.18850300143.
