= Kolbe–Schmitt reaction =

Carboxylation chemical reaction

Kolbe reaction
| Named after | Hermann Kolbe; Rudolf Schmitt |
| Reaction type | halogenation reaction |

Identifiers
| Organic Chemistry Portal | kolbe-schmitt-reaction |
| RSC ontology ID | RXNO:0000182 |

The Kolbe–Schmitt reaction or Kolbe process (named after Hermann Kolbe and Rudolf Schmitt) is a carboxylation chemical reaction that proceeds by treating phenol with sodium hydroxide to form sodium phenoxide, then heating sodium phenoxide with carbon dioxide under pressure (100 atm, 125 °C), then treating the product with sulfuric acid. The final product is an aromatic hydroxy acid which is also known as salicylic acid (the precursor to aspirin).

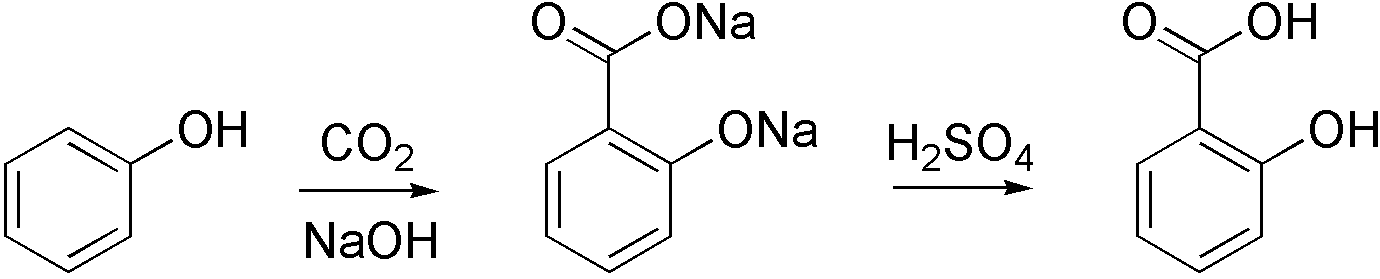
The Kolbe–Schmitt reaction

This reaction can also be performed using potassium hydroxide which yields both Salicylic acid and 4-Hydroxybenzoic acid.

The methodology is also used in the industrial synthesis of 3-hydroxy-2-naphthoic acid; the regiochemistry of the carboxylation in this case is sensitive to temperature.

== Reaction mechanism ==
The Kolbe–Schmitt reaction proceeds via the nucleophilic addition of a phenoxide, classically sodium phenoxide (NaOC_{6}H_{5}), to carbon dioxide to give the salicylate. The final step is the reaction (protonation) of the salicylate anion with an acid to form the desired salicylic acids (ortho- and para- isomers).

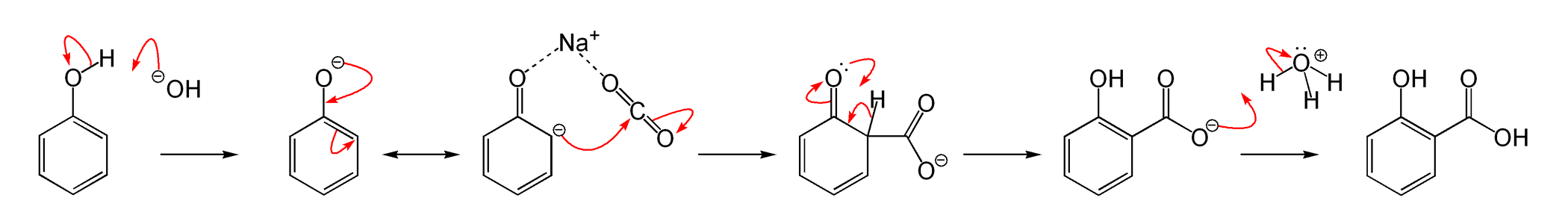
Kolbe–Schmitt reaction

(animation)

== Homogeneous Kolbe-Schmitt Reaction ==
A modification of the classical solid-phase Kolbe-Schmitt reaction, where the solvent play a role of active media dissolving reagents and solvating cations and anions. Typical solvents for homogeneous Kolbe-Schmitt reaction are DMSO, DMF, HMPTA. Carboxylation of sodium and potassium phenoxides in solution of DMSO proceeds under milder temperature (100 °C) with high para-regioselectivity (up to 97:3) producing 4-hydroxybenzoic acid (4HBA) instead of 2-hydroxybenzoic (salicylic) acid (SA). Addition into the reaction mixture of basic sodium salts like mesytolate, isopropylcarbonate, tert-butylcarbonate increase the chemical yield of a mixture 4HBA&SA up to two fold.

Screening of various metal cations, different substituted phenoxides, solvents (DMSO and DMF) in combination with activating additive (mesytolate) provide a general and effective method of homogeneous carboxylation.

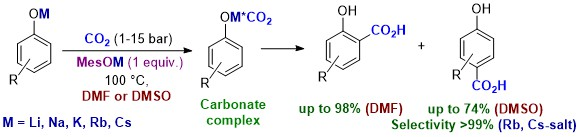
Homogeneous carboxylation

Particularly, rubidium and cesium salts directed carboxylation into para-position of phenoxides with unprecedented regioselectivity. It is suggested that the mechanism of the reaction involves molecular associates which are responsible for decreasing the activation energy barrier of carboxylation. Carboxylation of potassium phenoxide was shown to occur rapidly under atmospheric CO₂ pressure at 113°C in a gasometric study.
