= Structural theory =

In chemistry, structural theory explains the large variety in chemical compounds in terms of atoms making up molecules, the arrangement of atoms within molecules and the electrons that hold them together. According to structural theory, from the structural formula of a molecule it is possible to derive physical and spectroscopic data and to predict chemical reactivity.

Beginning from about 1858, many scientists from several countries took part in the early development of structural theory, including August Kekule, Archibald Scott Couper, and Aleksandr Mikhailovich Butlerov. It was Butlerov who coined the phrase "chemical structure" in the following quotation from an article published in 1861:

…the chemical nature of a compound molecule depends on the nature and quantity of its elementary constituents and its chemical structure.
