= Sodium phenoxide =

Chemical Compound

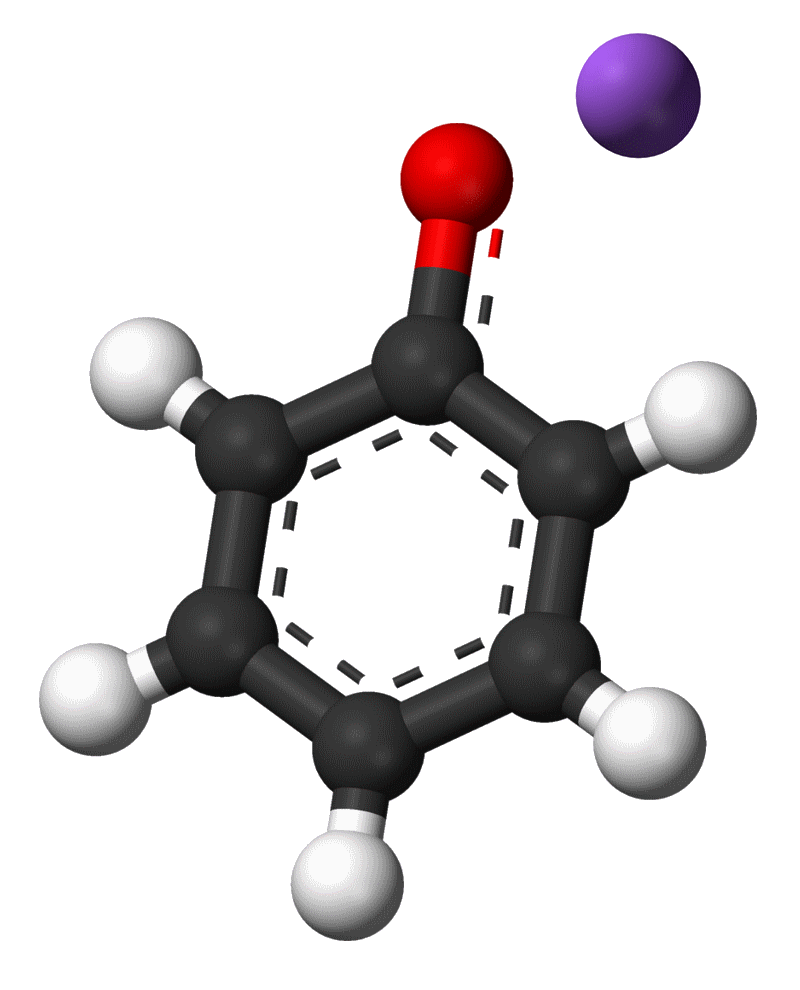

Names
- Preferred IUPAC name Sodium phenoxide
- Other names Sodium phenolate

Identifiers
CAS Number	139-02-6
3D model (JSmol)	Interactive image
Abbreviations	PhONa
ChemSpider	8420
ECHA InfoCard	100.004.862
PubChem CID	4445035
UNII	4NC0T56V35
CompTox Dashboard (EPA)	DTXSID4027072
- InChI: InChI=1S/C6H6O.Na/c7-6-4-2-1-3-5-6;/h1-5,7H;/q;+1/p-1 Key: NESLWCLHZZISNB-UHFFFAOYSA-M; InChI=1/C6H6O.Na/c7-6-4-2-1-3-5-6;/h1-5,7H;/q;+1/p-1 Key: NESLWCLHZZISNB-REWHXWOFAP
- SMILES: [Na+].[O-]c1ccccc1

Properties
Chemical formula	C_{6}H_{5}NaO
Molar mass	116.095 g·mol^{−1}
Appearance	White solid

Hazards
- Occupational safety and health (OHS/OSH)
Main hazards	Harmful, Corrosive
Flash point	Non-flammable
Autoignition temperature	Non-flammable
- Except where otherwise noted, data are given for materials in their standard state (at 25 °C [77 °F], 100 kPa). Infobox references

Sodium phenoxide (sodium phenolate) is an organic compound with the formula NaOC_{6}H_{5}. It is a white crystalline solid. Its anion, phenoxide, also known as phenolate, is the conjugate base of phenol. It is used as a precursor to many other organic compounds, such as aryl ethers.

== Synthesis and structure ==
Most commonly, solutions of sodium phenoxide are produced by treating phenol with sodium hydroxide. Anhydrous derivatives can be prepared by combining phenol and sodium. A related, updated procedure uses sodium methoxide instead of sodium hydroxide:

NaOCH_{3} + HOC_{6}H_{5} → NaOC_{6}H_{5} + HOCH_{3}

Sodium phenoxide can also be produced by the "alkaline fusion" of benzenesulfonic acid, whereby the sulfonate groups are displaced by hydroxide:

C_{6}H_{5}SO_{3}Na + 2 NaOH → C_{6}H_{5}OH + Na_{2}SO_{3}

This route once was the principal industrial route to phenol.

== Structure ==
Like other sodium alkoxides, solid sodium phenoxide adopts a complex structure involving multiple Na-O bonds. Solvent-free material is polymeric, each Na center being bound to three oxygen ligands as well as the phenyl ring. Adducts of sodium phenoxide are molecular, such as the cubane-type cluster [NaOPh]_{4}(HMPA)_{4}.

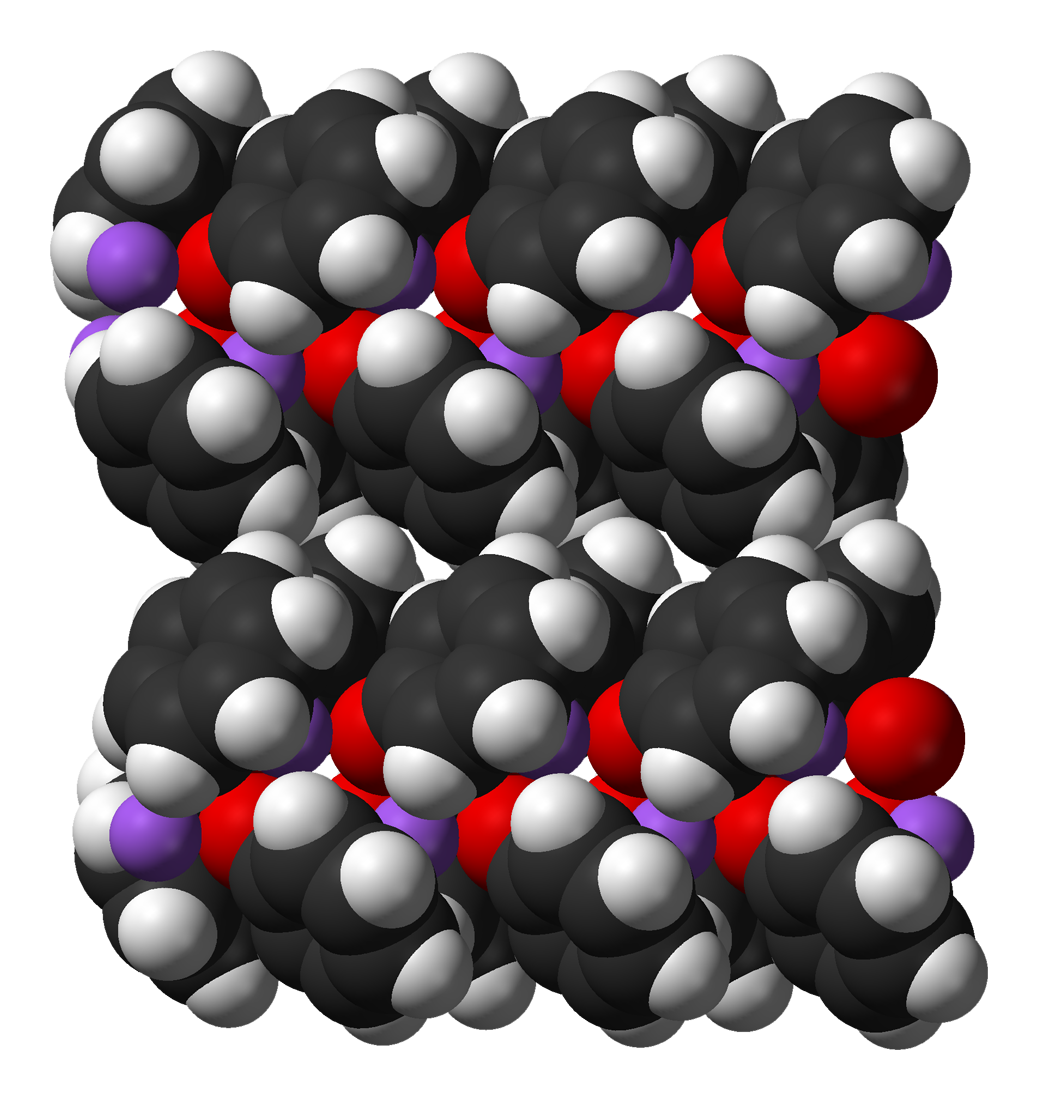
Part of the crystal structure of pure sodium phenoxide

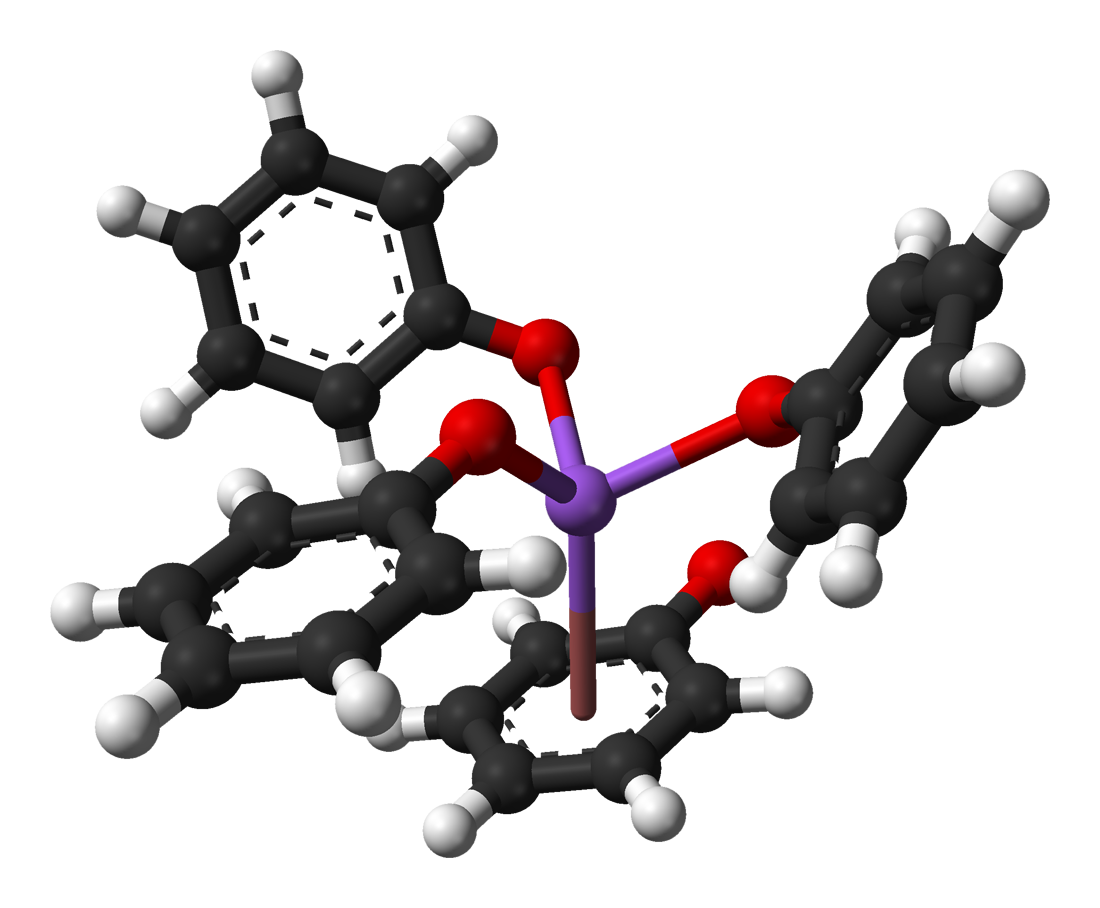
Subunit of the crystal structure of pure sodium phenoxide, illustrating the binding of phenoxide ions to sodium through both the oxygen and the arene.

== Reactions ==
Sodium phenoxide is a moderately strong base. Acidification gives phenol:

C_{6}H_{5}OH ⇌ C_{6}H_{5}O^{−} + H^{+} (K = 10^{−10})

The acid-base behavior is complicated by homoassociation, reflecting the association of phenol and phenoxide.

Sodium phenoxide reacts with alkylating agents to afford alkyl phenyl ethers:

NaOC_{6}H_{5} + RBr → ROC_{6}H_{5} + NaBr

The conversion is an extension of the Williamson ether synthesis. With acylating agents, one obtains phenyl esters:

NaOC_{6}H_{5} + RC(O)Cl → RCO_{2}C_{6}H_{5} + NaCl

Sodium phenoxide is susceptible to certain types of electrophilic aromatic substitutions. For example, it reacts with carbon dioxide to form 2-hydroxybenzoate, the conjugate base of salicylic acid. In general however, the oxygen center in phenoxide irreversibly attacks electrophiles.

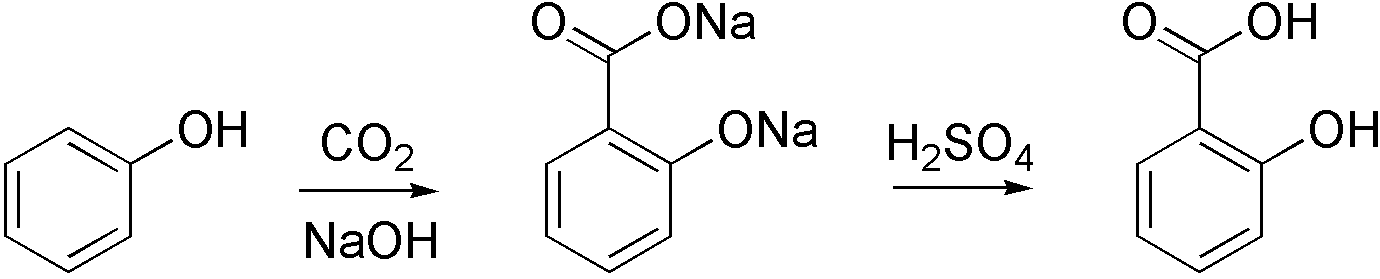
The Kolbe–Schmitt reaction.
