= Jiannan Butterfly Garden =

Butterfly garden in Taipei, Taiwan

- 劍南蝶園
- Common butterflies at JBG
- Interactive map of Jiannan Butterfly Garden
- Type: Municipal
- Location: Taipei, Taiwan
- Coordinates: 25°5′14″N 121°33′14″E
- Area: 11.5 ha (28 acres)
- Elevation: 122 m (400 ft)
- Established: 2008
- Administrator: Butterfly Conservation Society of Taiwan
- Open: year-round
- Hiking trails: 1.7 km.
- Species: 160 butterfly species
- Public transit: Taipei Metro Jiannan station, Taipei Bus 203, 204, 205, 208, 279, 605 Jiannan Road.

Jiannan Butterfly Garden (JBG, Chinese: 劍南蝶園) is a public park dedicated to the conservation of butterflies. Located in Taipei, it is the only outdoor butterfly preserve in Taiwan, and is open to the public year-round, free of charge.

The garden is accessed via the Jiannan Butterfly Garden Trail, climbing a series of steep stairs up the hillside of Mt. Jiannan. At the top of the climb is a canopy-covered pavilion that offers a view of the city below. The garden and trail encompass an area of 28 acres.

== History ==
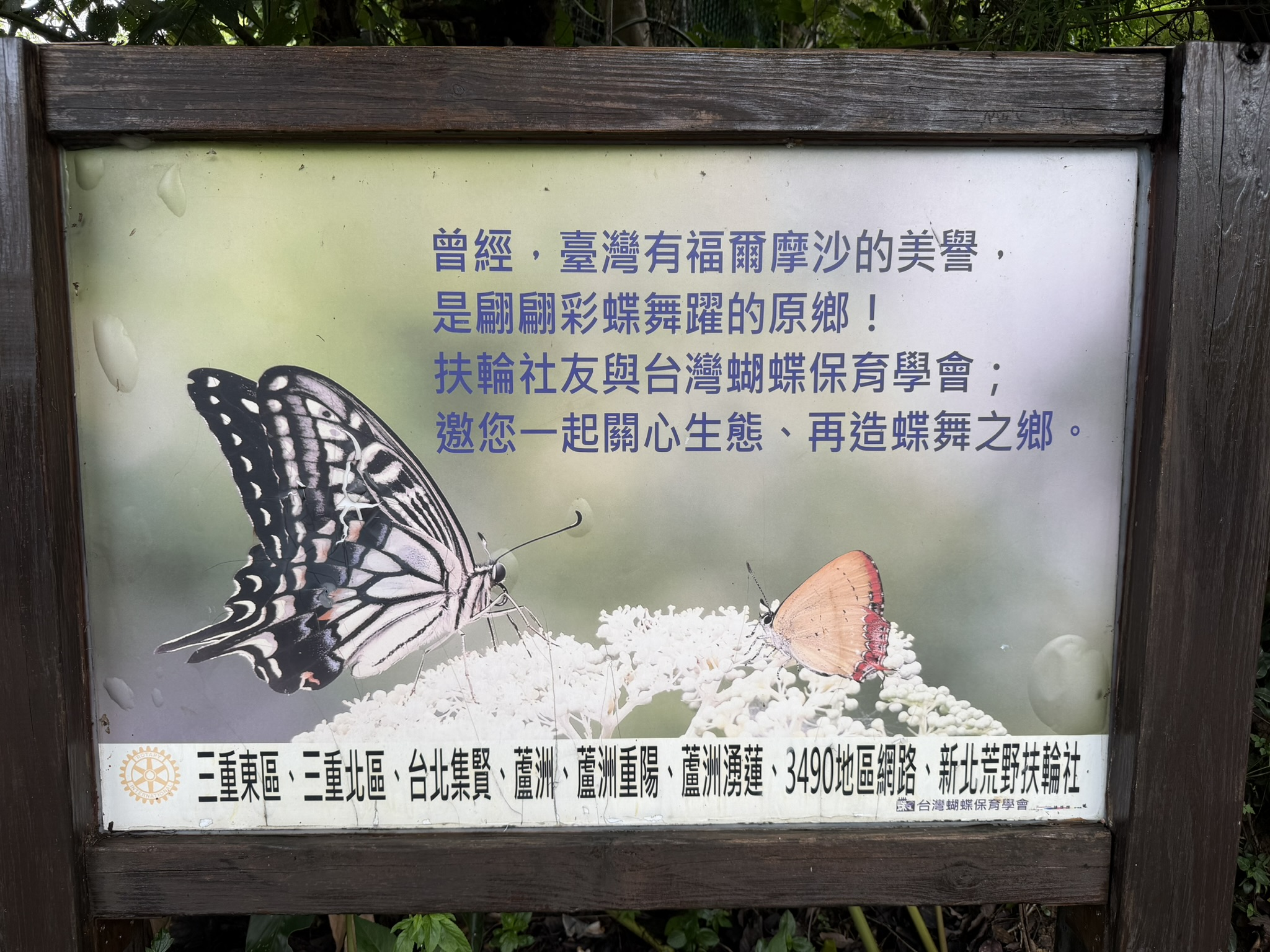
Welcome sign

In 1995, the Butterfly Conservation Society of Taiwan (BCST) started planning a butterfly research and conservation project along Jiannan Road. In 2002, the Forestry and Nature Conservation Agency assigned BCST to lead the development of Jiannan Butterfly Garden Trail on the hillside adjacent to Jiannan Road; the mission was restoring native habitats for the conservation of butterflies, taking periodic inventories of butterflies, and developing educational outreach programs. In 2008, the Jiannan Butterfly Garden was formally established by Taipei City Government Department of Economic Development. The restoration emphasized planting butterfly host plants and nectar plants, creating a suitable habitat for native butterflies.

In 2012, Rotary International local districts 3520 and 3490 started partnering with BCST in conservation and education efforts, including planting trees, removing invasive species, and installing interpretive signs along the trail.

In 2014, BCST volunteers started offering free guided tours on the first Sunday of each month; the tours usually attract 50-plus participants. Visitors choosing to explore the park on their own can find information about resident flora and fauna with the assistance of many interpretive signs, some of which have QR codes that can be scanned for further details.

== Species ==
Taiwan is known internationally as a "butterfly kingdom". There are a total of more than 400 butterfly species, or more than 30 species per 1,000 square miles, including 50 species that are endemic to Taiwan. By the end of 2016, volunteers at Jiannan Butterfly Garden had recorded 156 butterfly species, including these families:

- Hesperiidae: 27 species
- Lycaenidae: 27 species
- Nymphalidae: 74 species
- Papilionidae: 17 species
- Pieridae: 11 species

Important host and nectar plants targeted for preservation include the following:

- Ampelopsis brevipedunculata (Porcelain Berry) var. hancei: tiny flowers form platform-like inflorescences that attract butterflies in summer
- Clerodendrum cyrtophyllum (Mayflower Glorybower): flowers form flat panicles, blooming in summer
- Crateva adansonii formosensis (Taiwan Garlic Pear), a Taiwan endemic subspecies): attracts many Pieridae native butterflies
- Iris domestica (locally Belamcanda Chinensis Blackberry Lily): a Taiwan native species that is also widely cultivated as an ornamental in gardens
- Pittosporum tobira (Japanese Cheesewood): highly fragrant flowers attract many insects
- Premna serratifolia (Malbau, or "headache tree"): clusters of small flowers form a nectar platform, an excellent nectar source for butterflies in summer
- Rhaphiolepis indica (Indian Hawthorn) var. tashiroi: flowers form terminal panicles, blooming in spring
- Sapindus mukorossi (Reetha): the only host plant for Satyrium formosanum (Chinese: 臺灣灑灰蝶)
- Schefflera octophylla (Ivy Tree): flowers cluster into multiple umbels to form a large panicle for butterflies to perch on, an excellent nectar source for butterflies in winter
- Tetradium glabrifolium: a host plant for swallowtail butterflies and also a nectar plant for many other butterflies

== Plants gallery ==
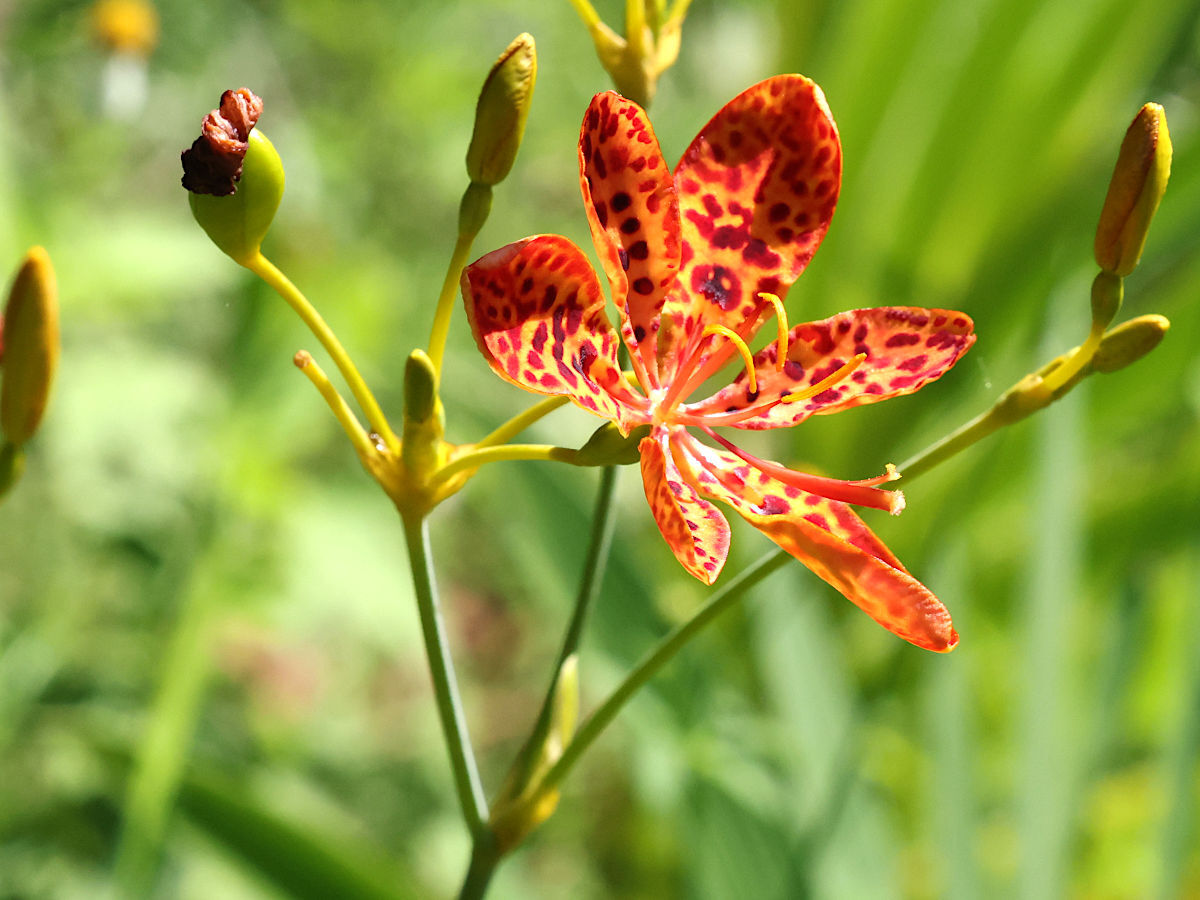
Iris domestica (Blackberry Lily)

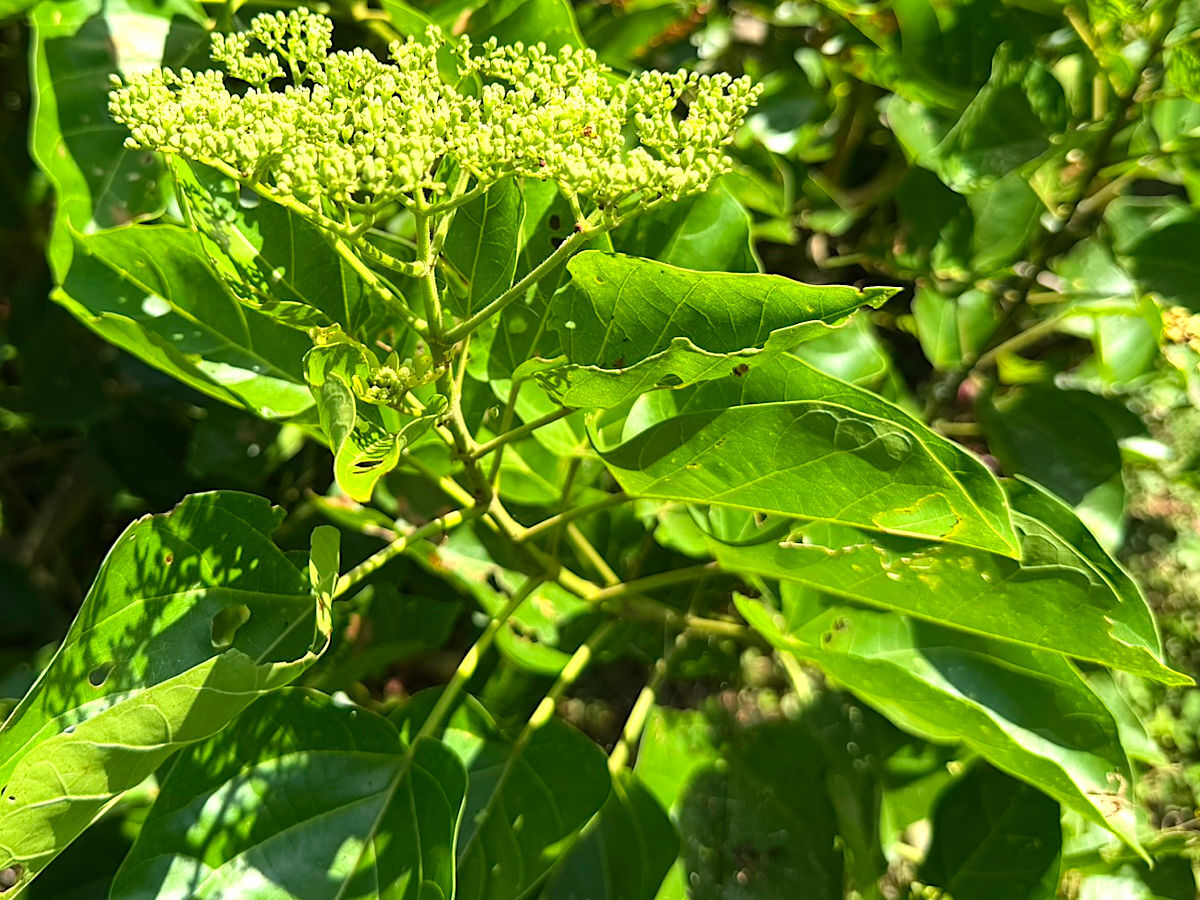
Premna serratifolia (Malbau)

== Butterflies gallery ==
=== Taiwan endemic ===
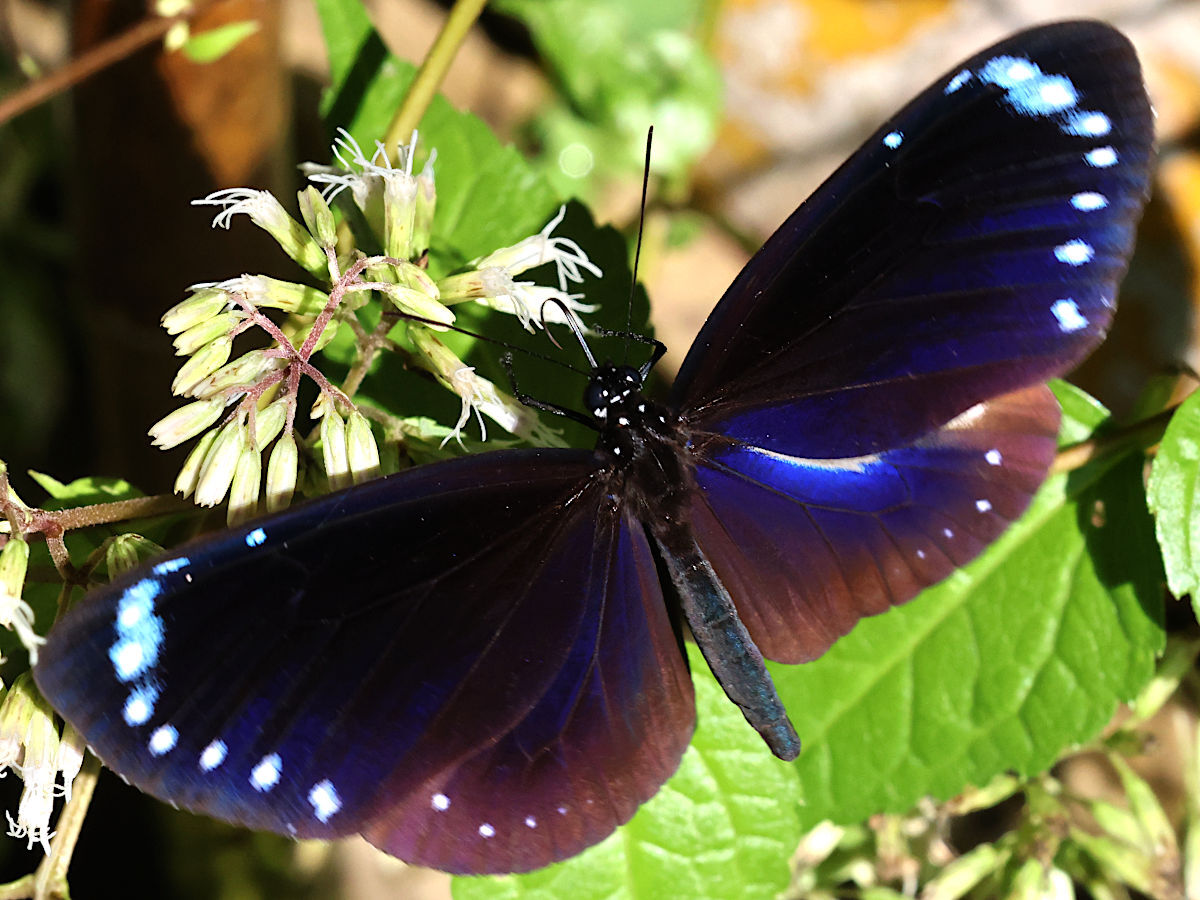
Euploea tulliolus koxinga (Purple Crow Butterfly)

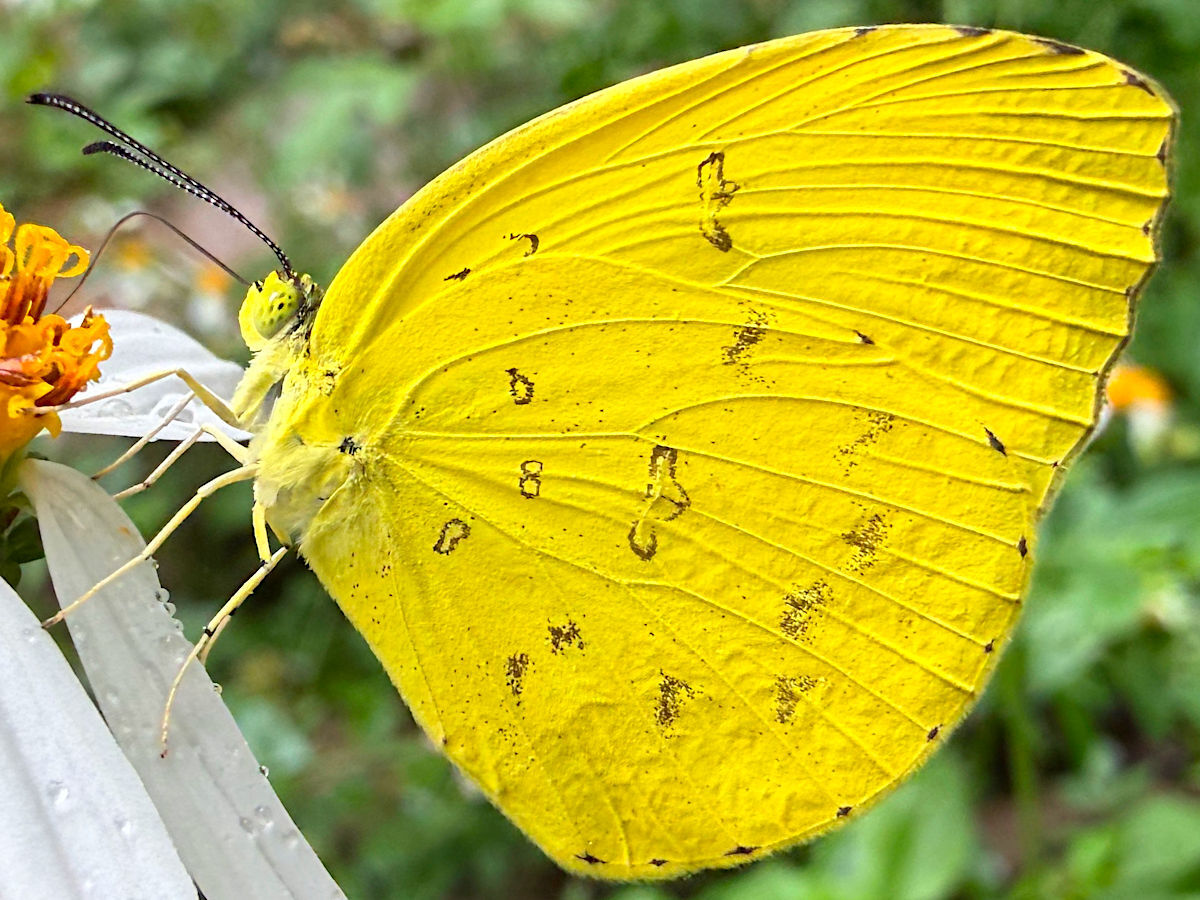
Eurema blanda arsakia (Three-spotted Grass Yellow)

Graphium sarpedon connectens (Common Bluebottle) video

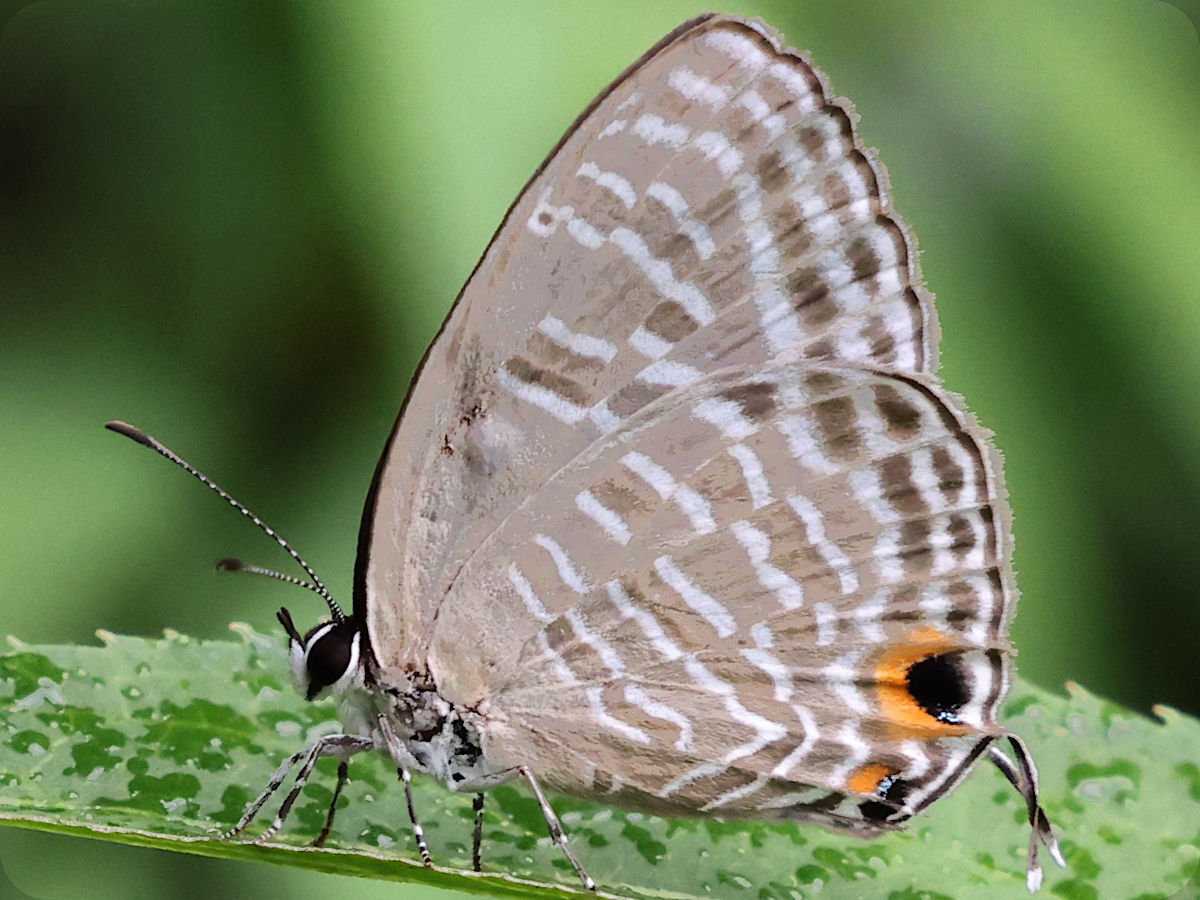
Jamides alecto dromicus (Metallic Cerulean)

Papilio bianor thrasymedes (Chinese Peacock Swallowtail)

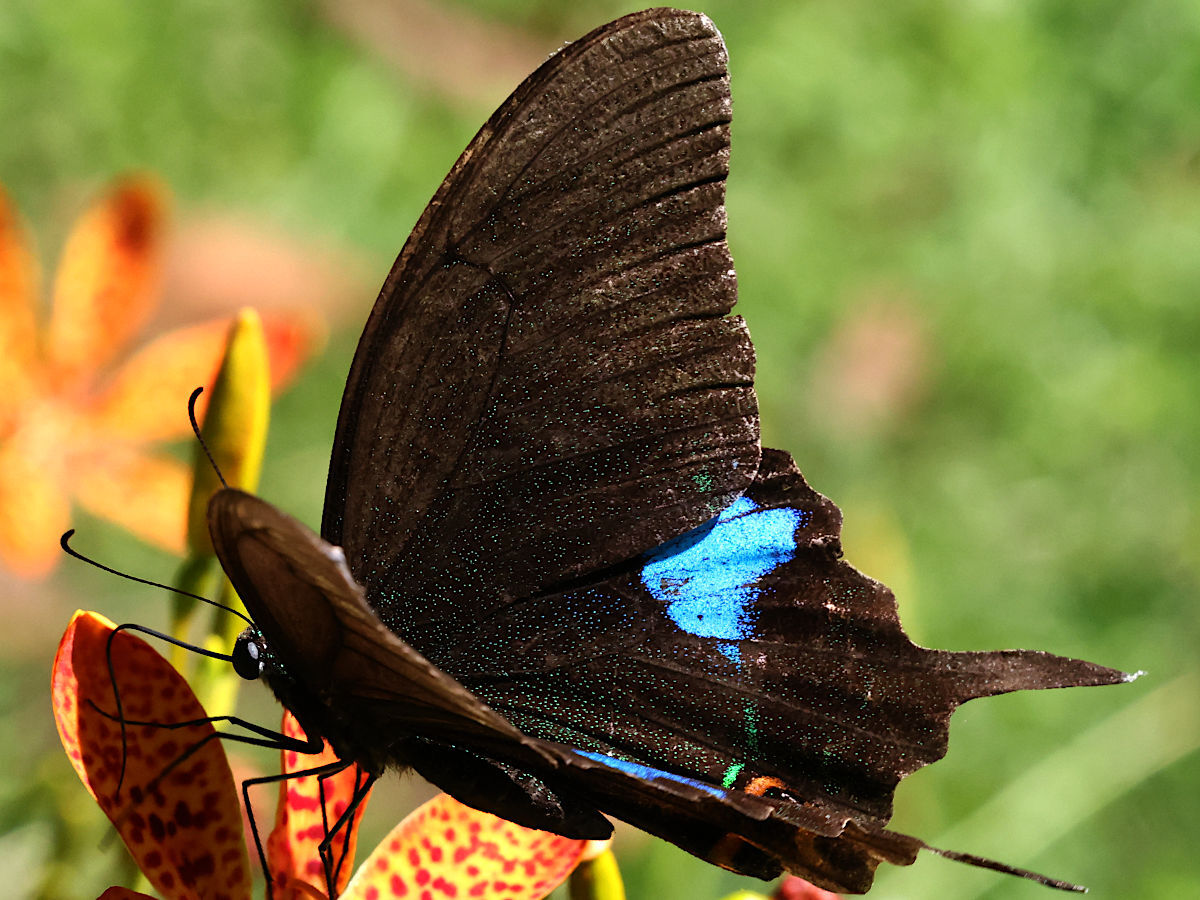
Papilio paris nakaharai (Paris Peacock Swallowtail)

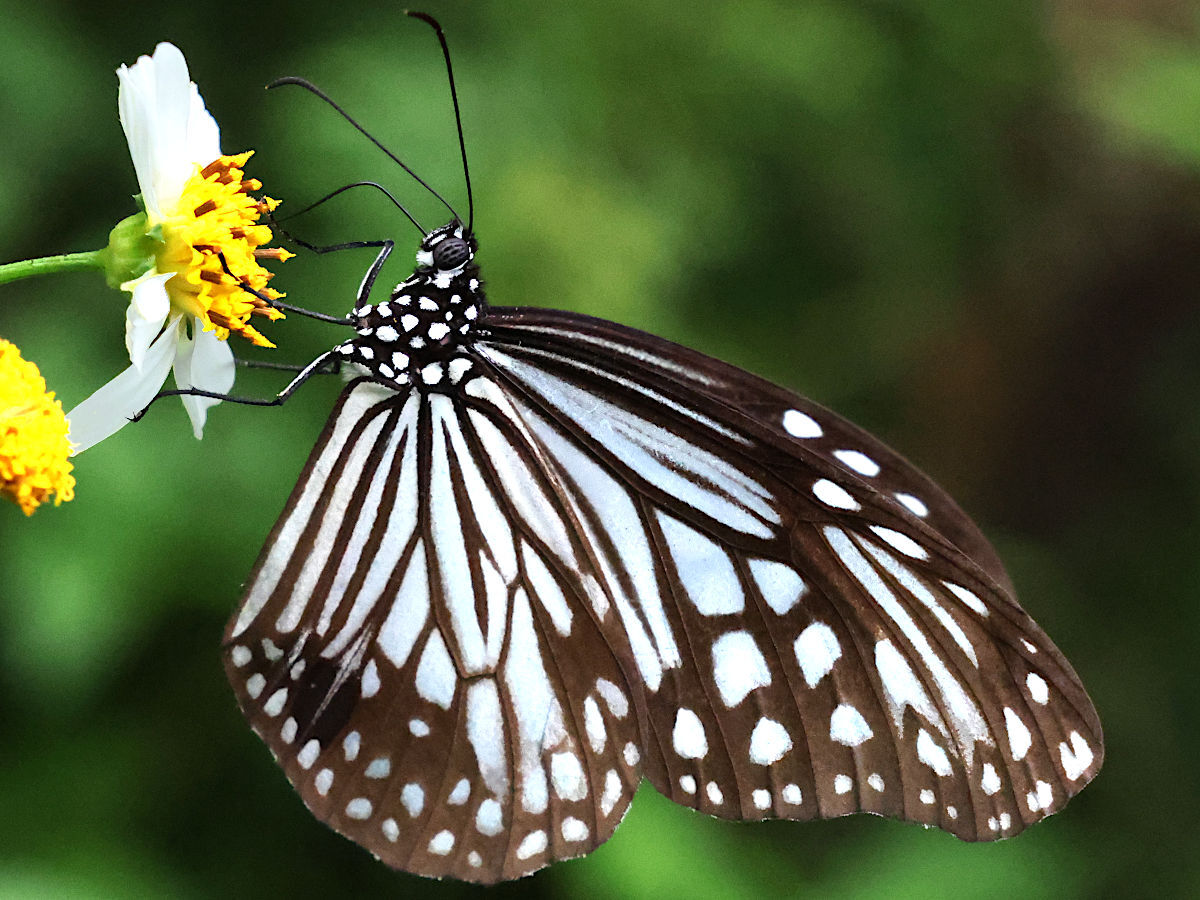
Parantica aglea maghaba (Glassy Tiger)

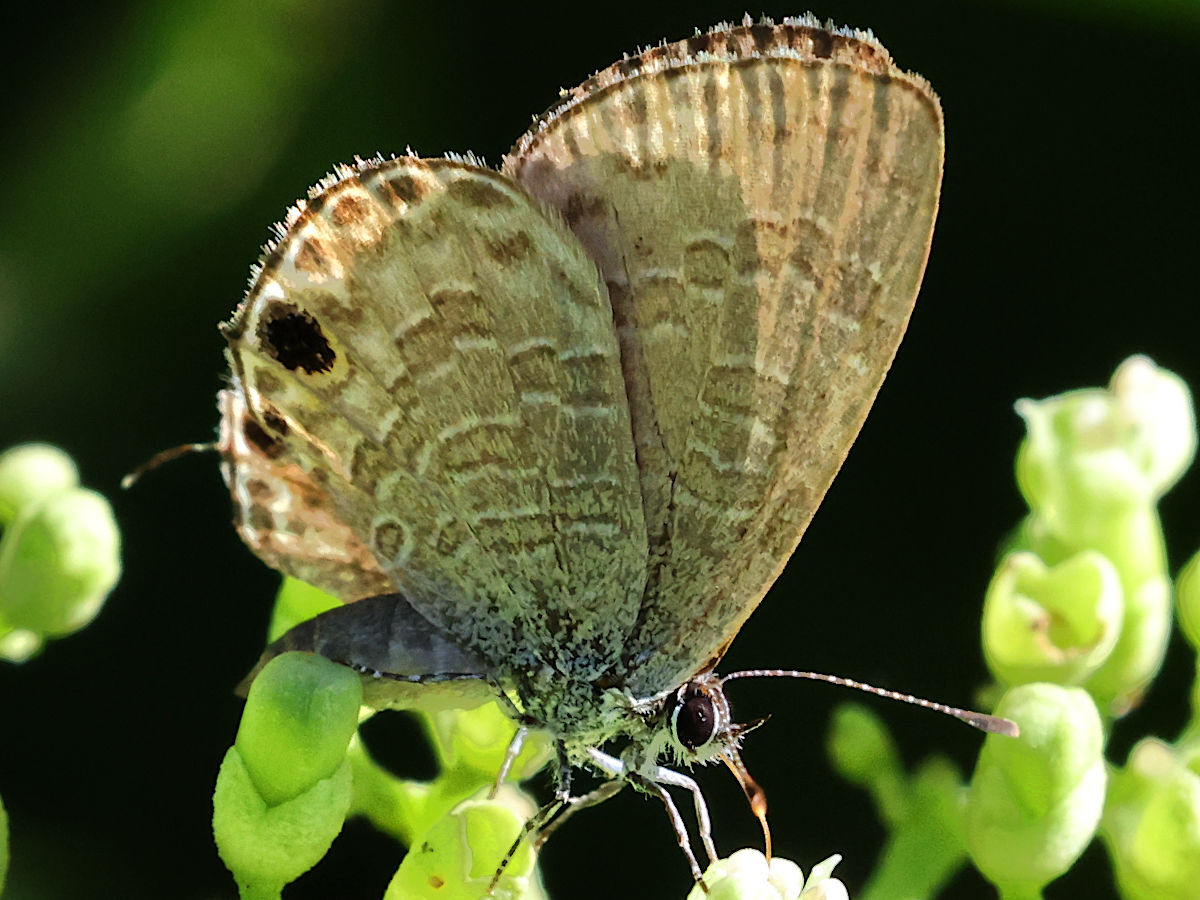
Prosotas nora formosana (Common Line Blue)

=== Non endemic ===
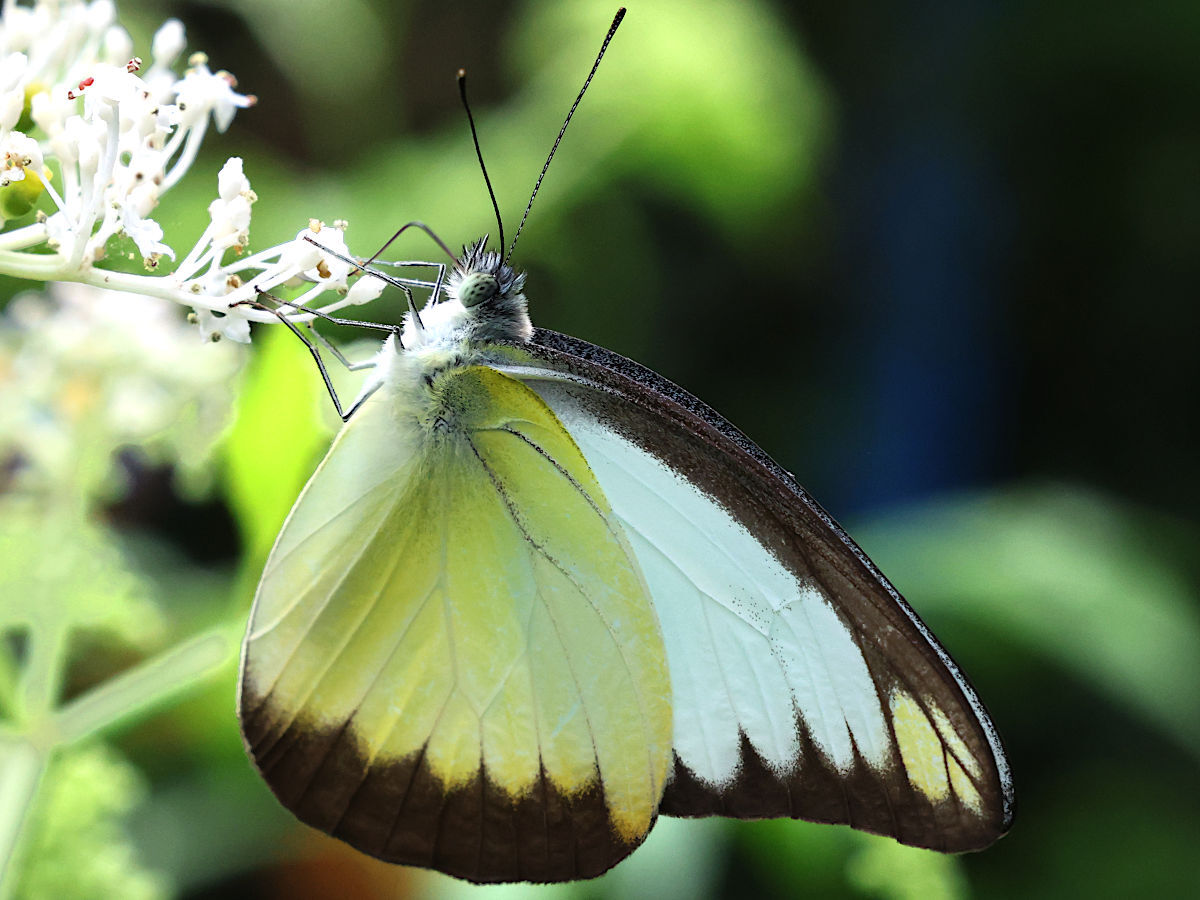
Appias lyncida eleonora (Indo-Chinese Chocolate Albatross)

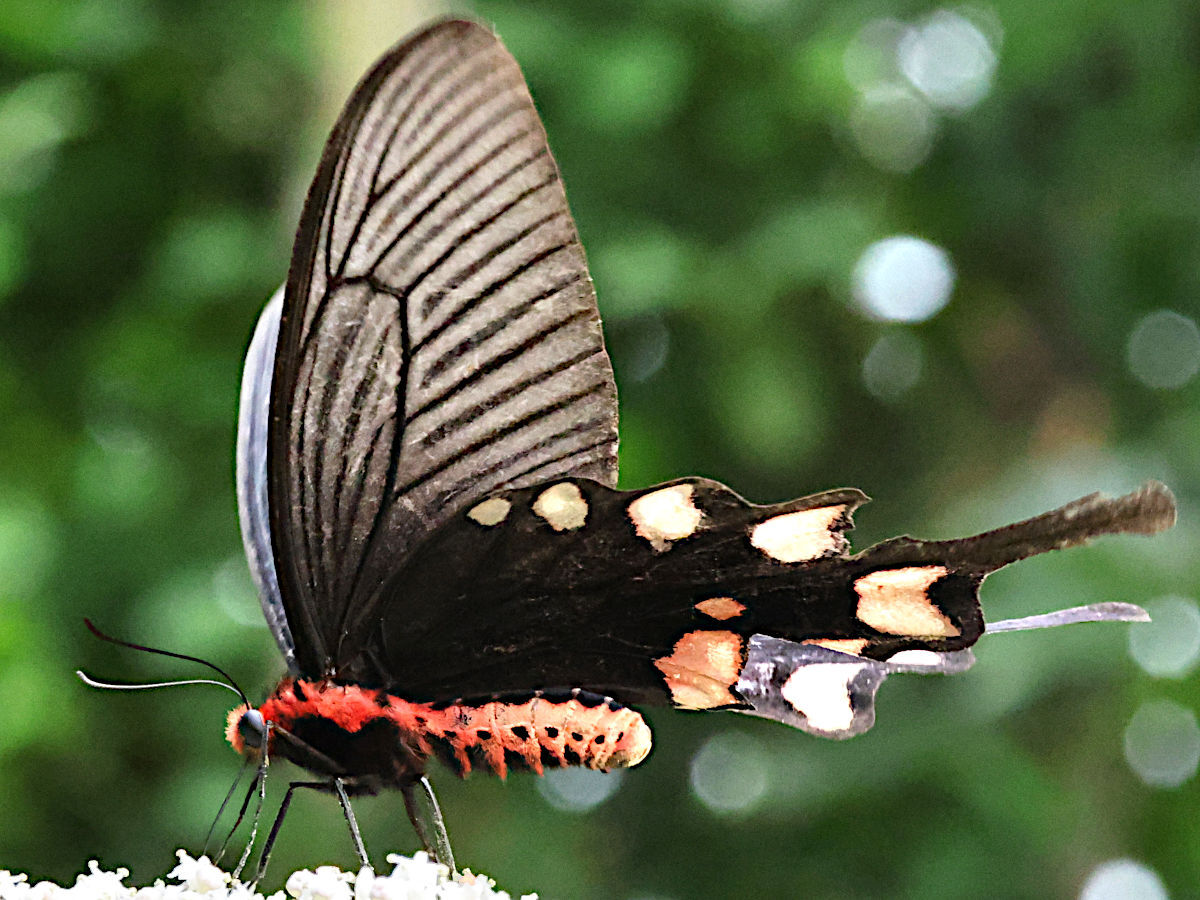
Byasa impediens febanus (Pink-spotted Windmill)

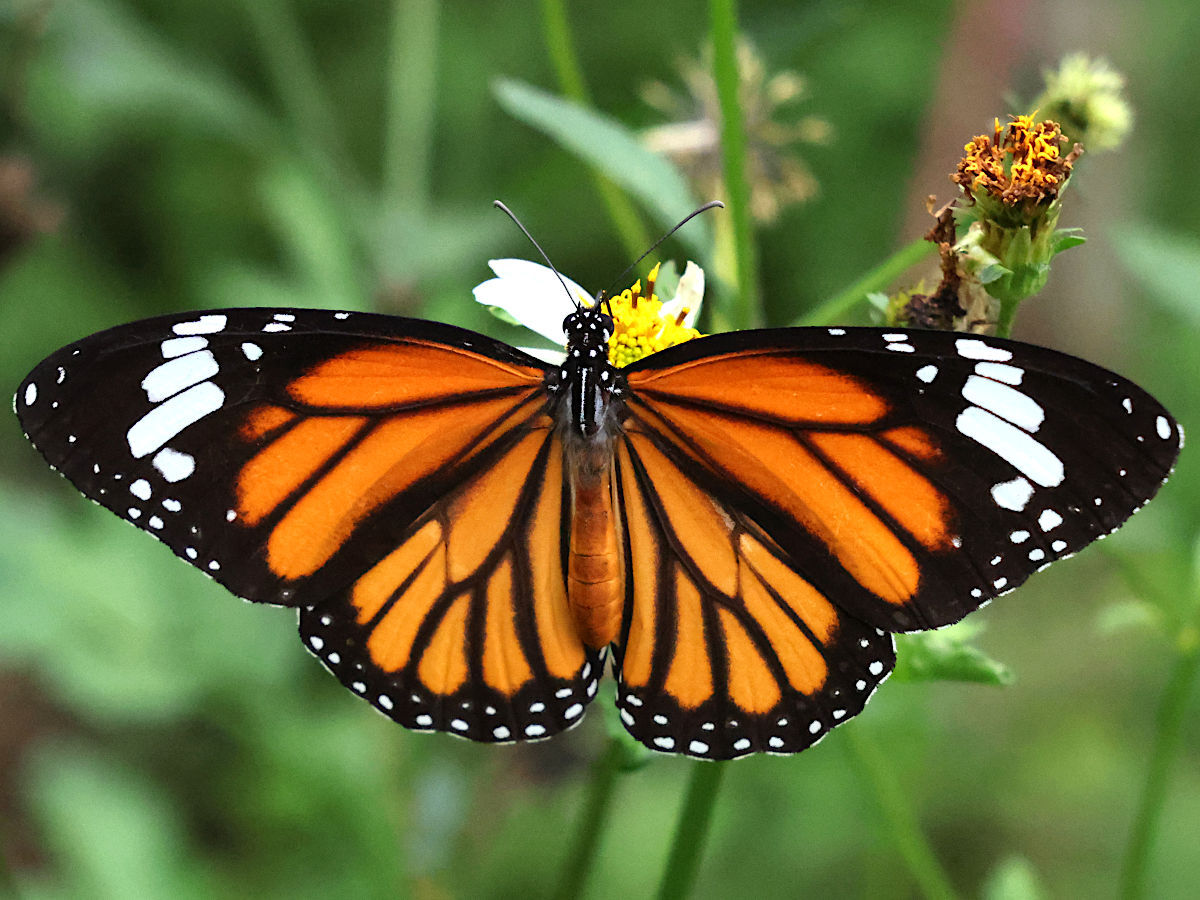
Danaus genutia (Common Tiger Butterfly)

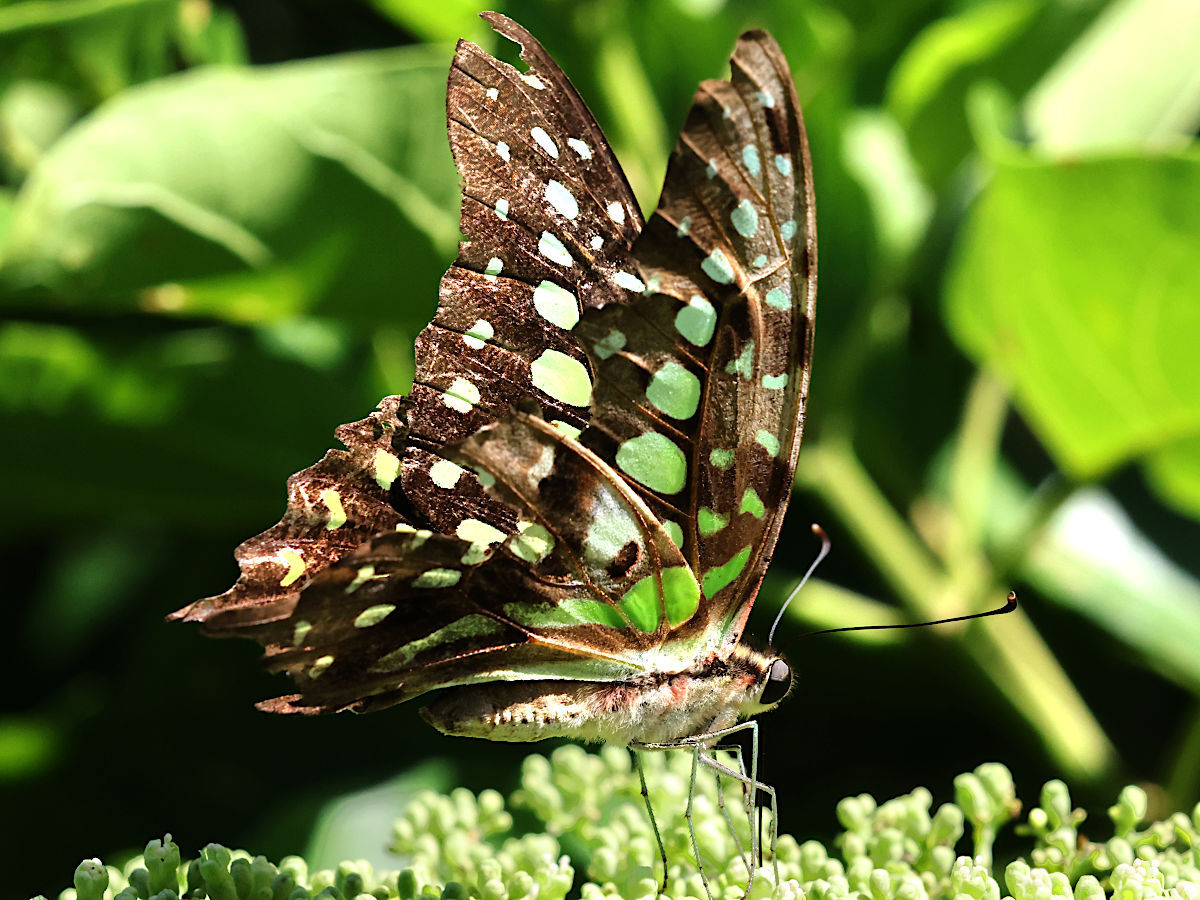
Graphium agamemnon agamemnon (Oriental Tailed Jay)

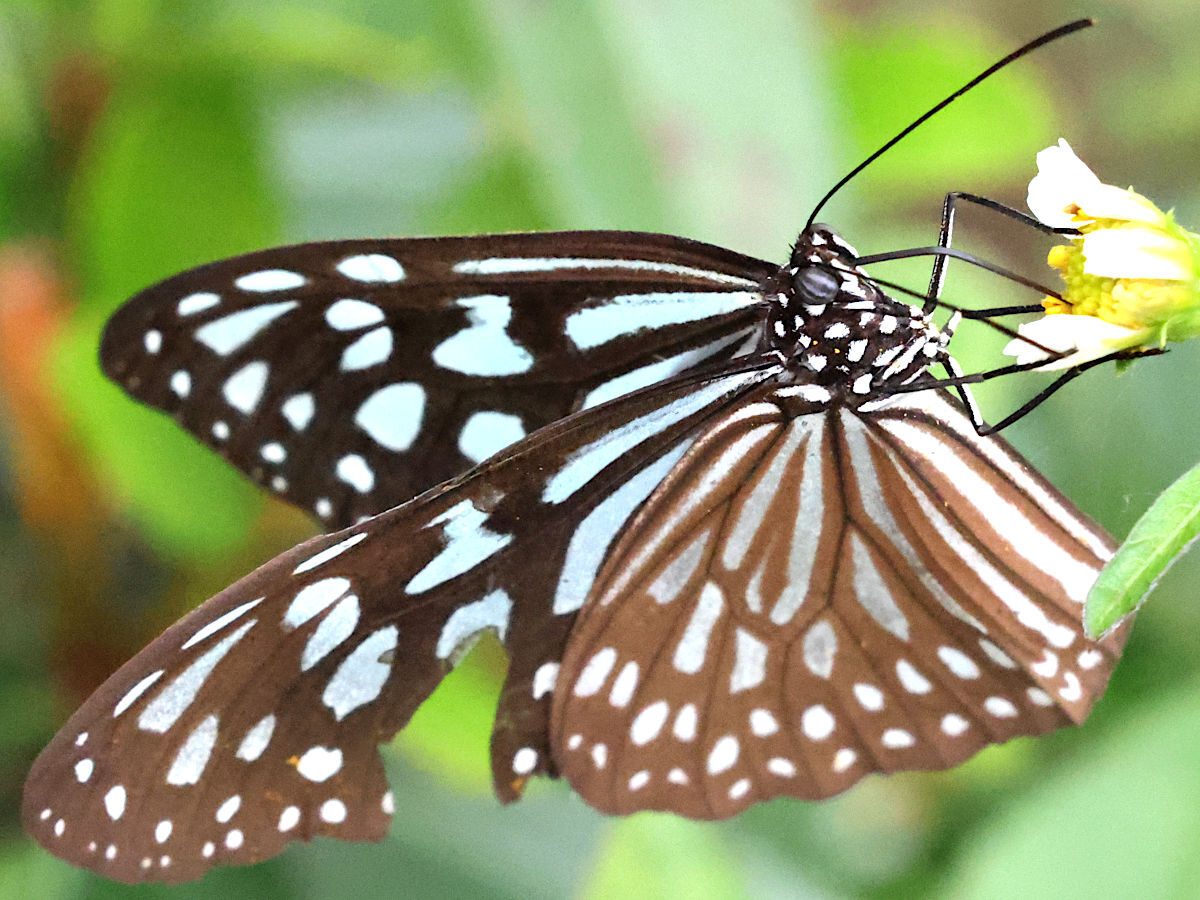
Ideopsis similis (Ceylon Blue Glassy Tiger)

== Other fauna gallery ==
=== Taiwan endemic ===
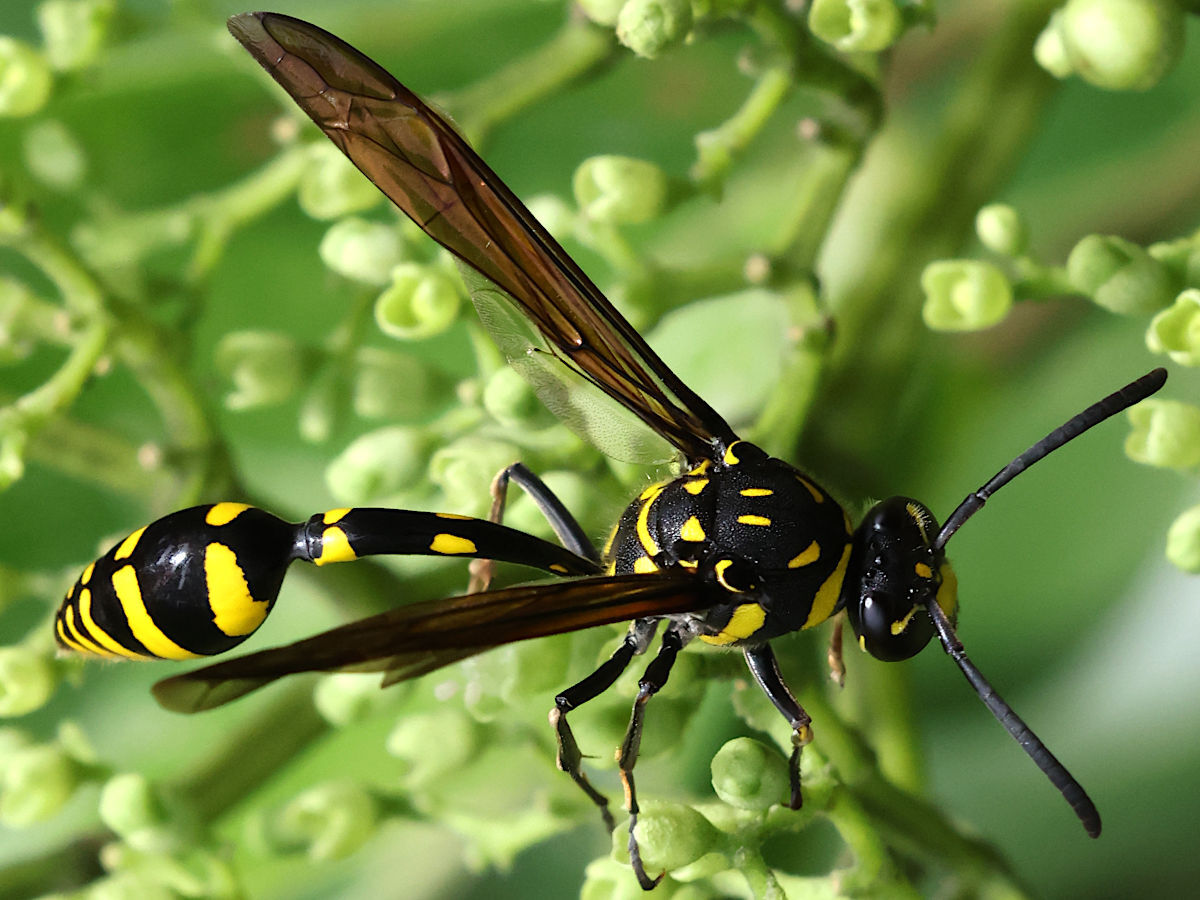
Phimenes flavopictus formosanus (potter wasp)

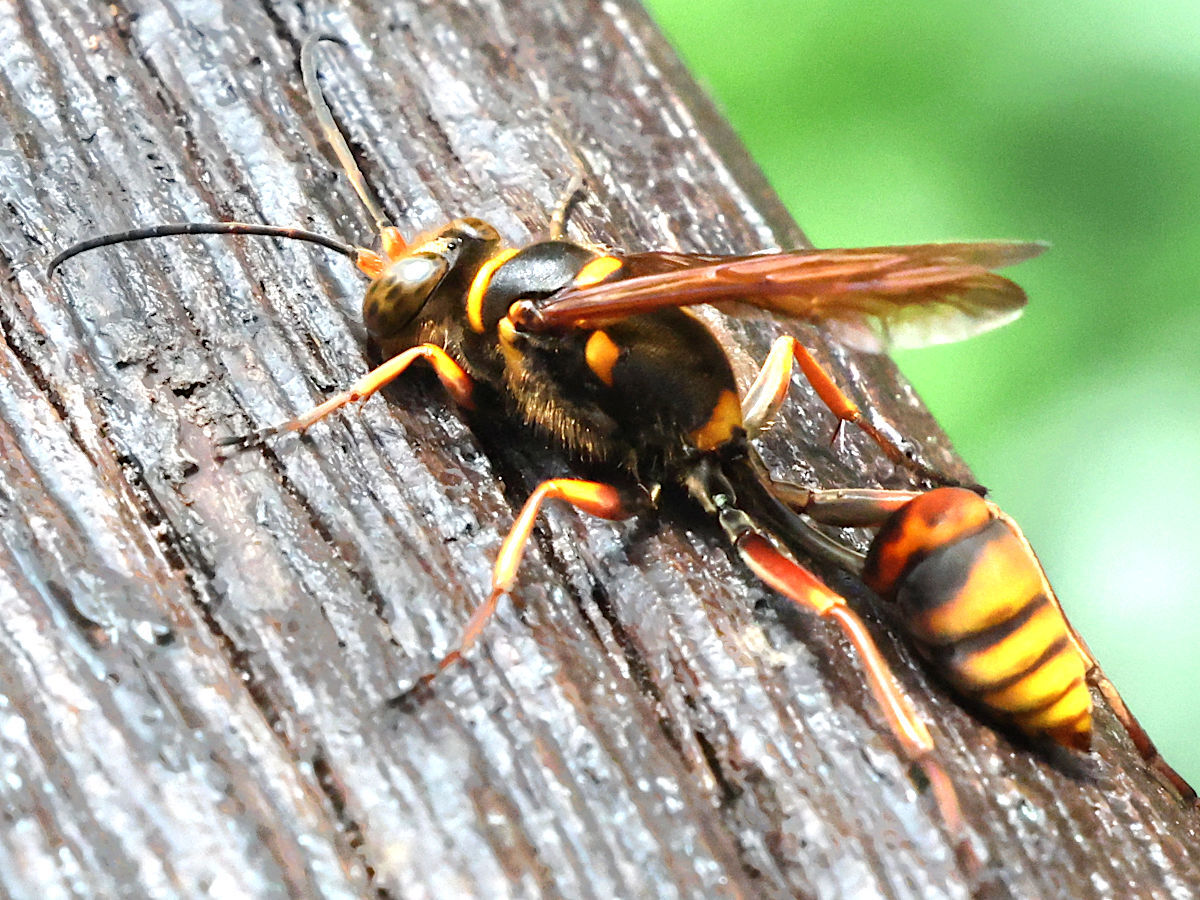
Sceliphron deforme taiwanum (mud-dauber wasp)

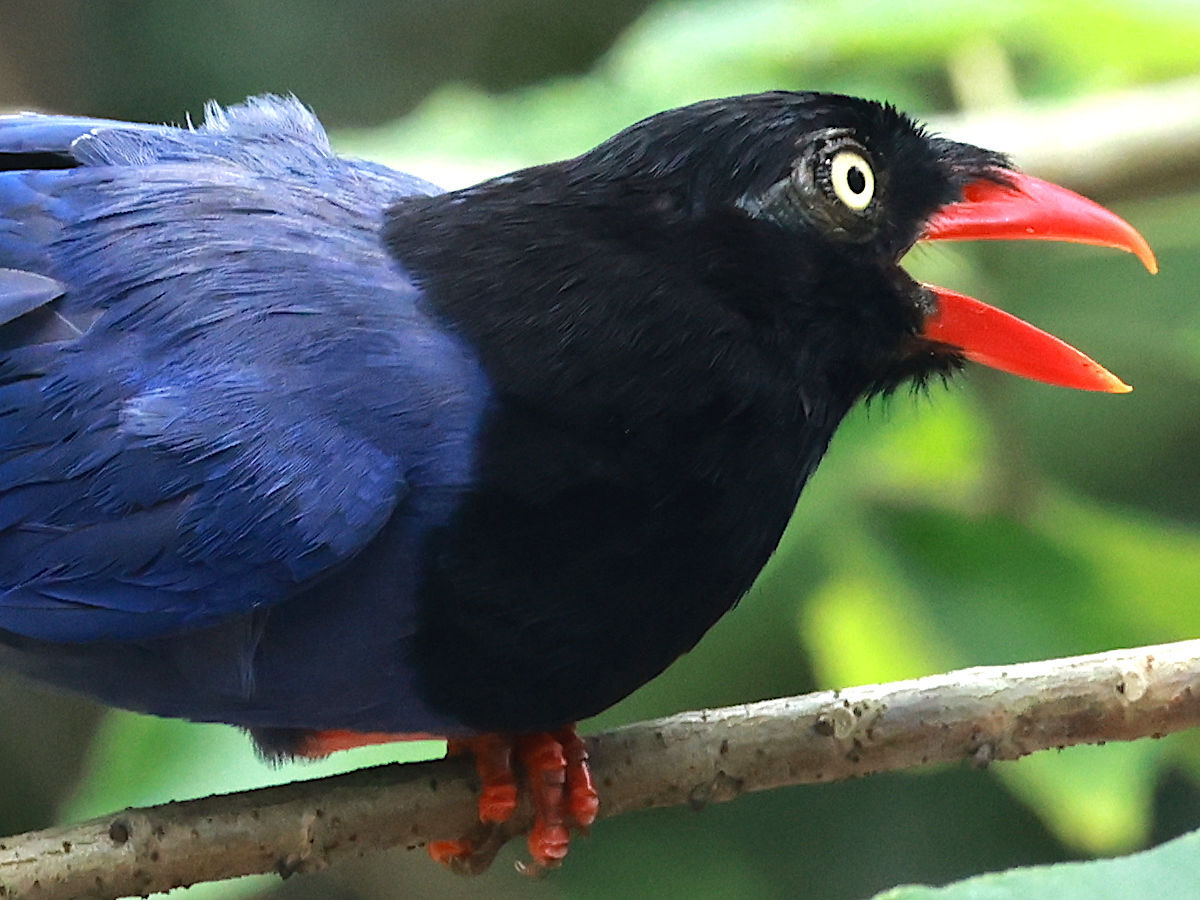
Urocissa caerulea (Taiwan Blue-Magpie)

=== Non endemic ===
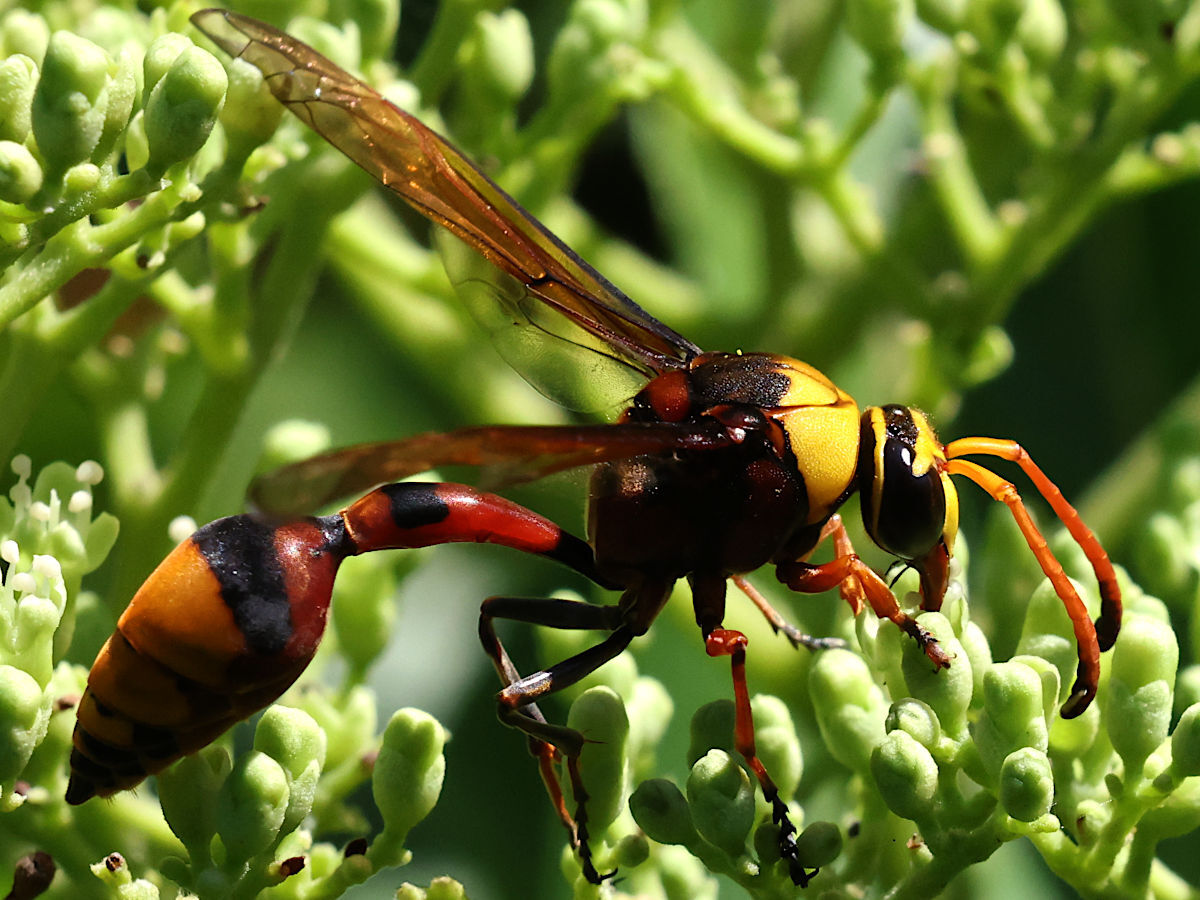
Delta pyriforme (potter wasp)

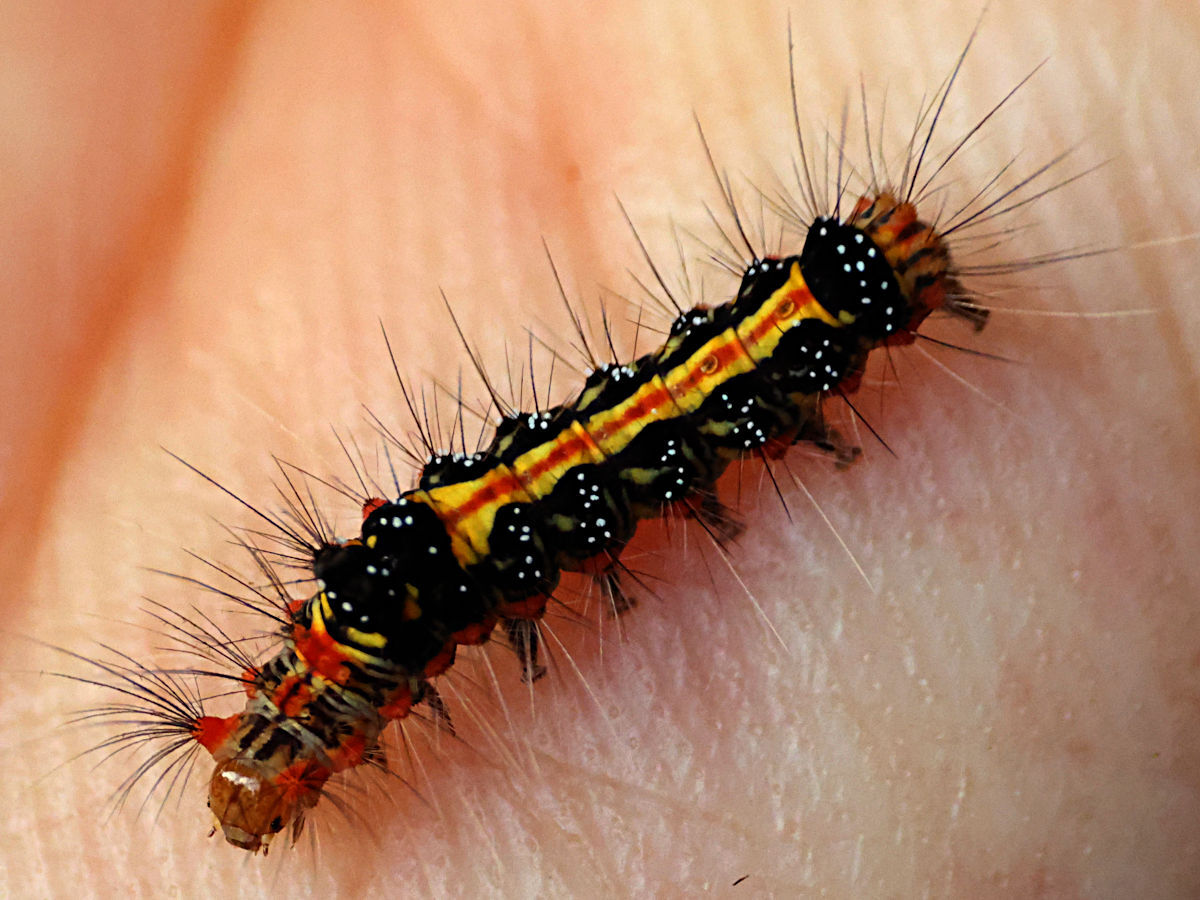
Euproctis taiwana (Taiwan Yellow Tussock Moth)

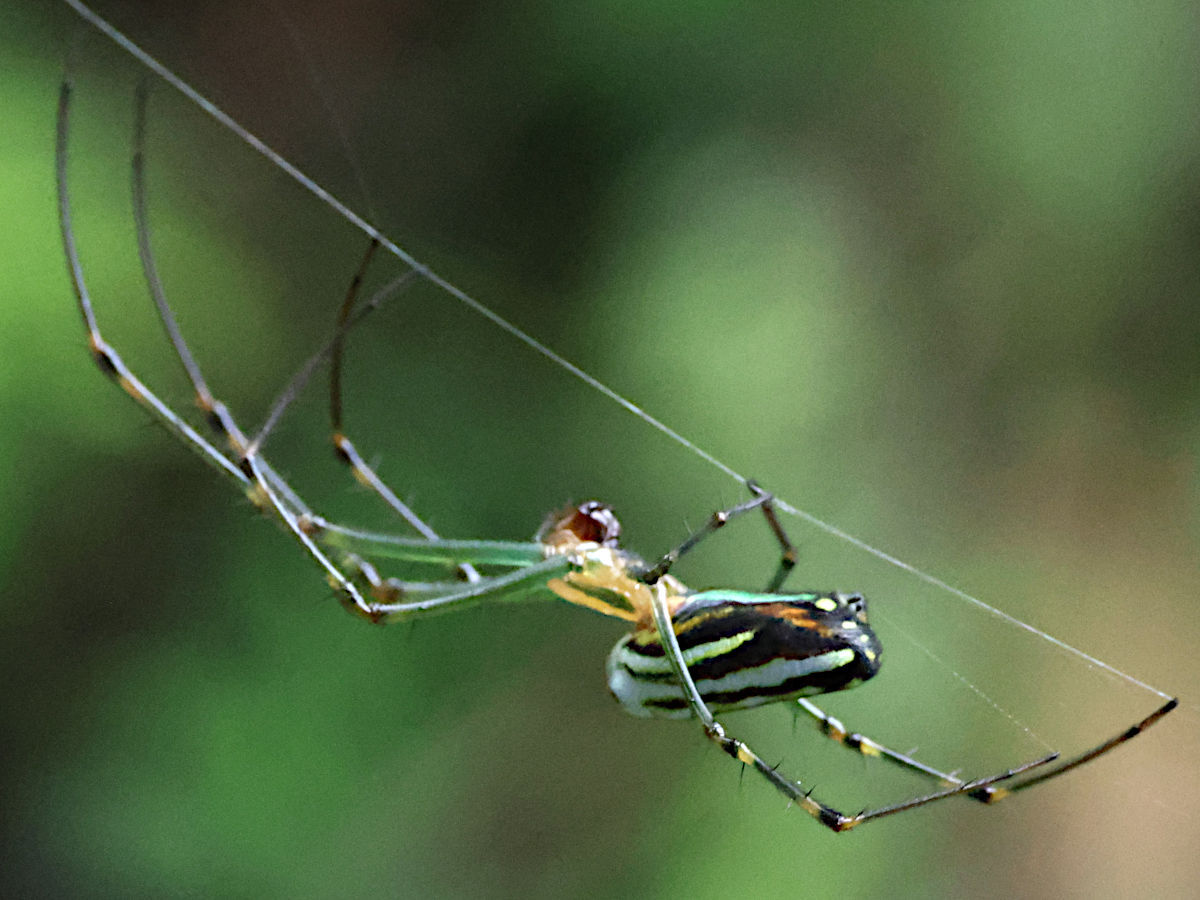
Leucauge blanda (orb weaver spider)

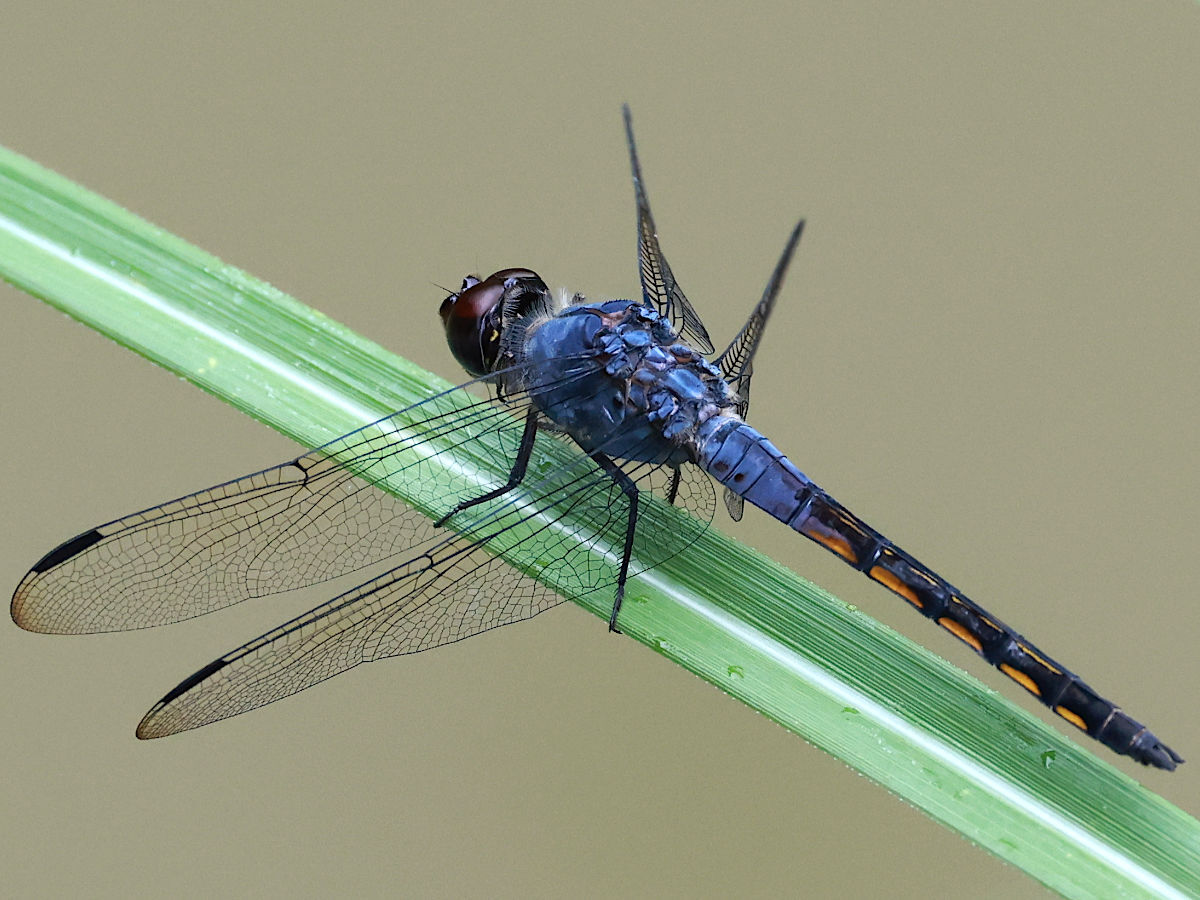
Potamarcha congener (Swampwatcher)

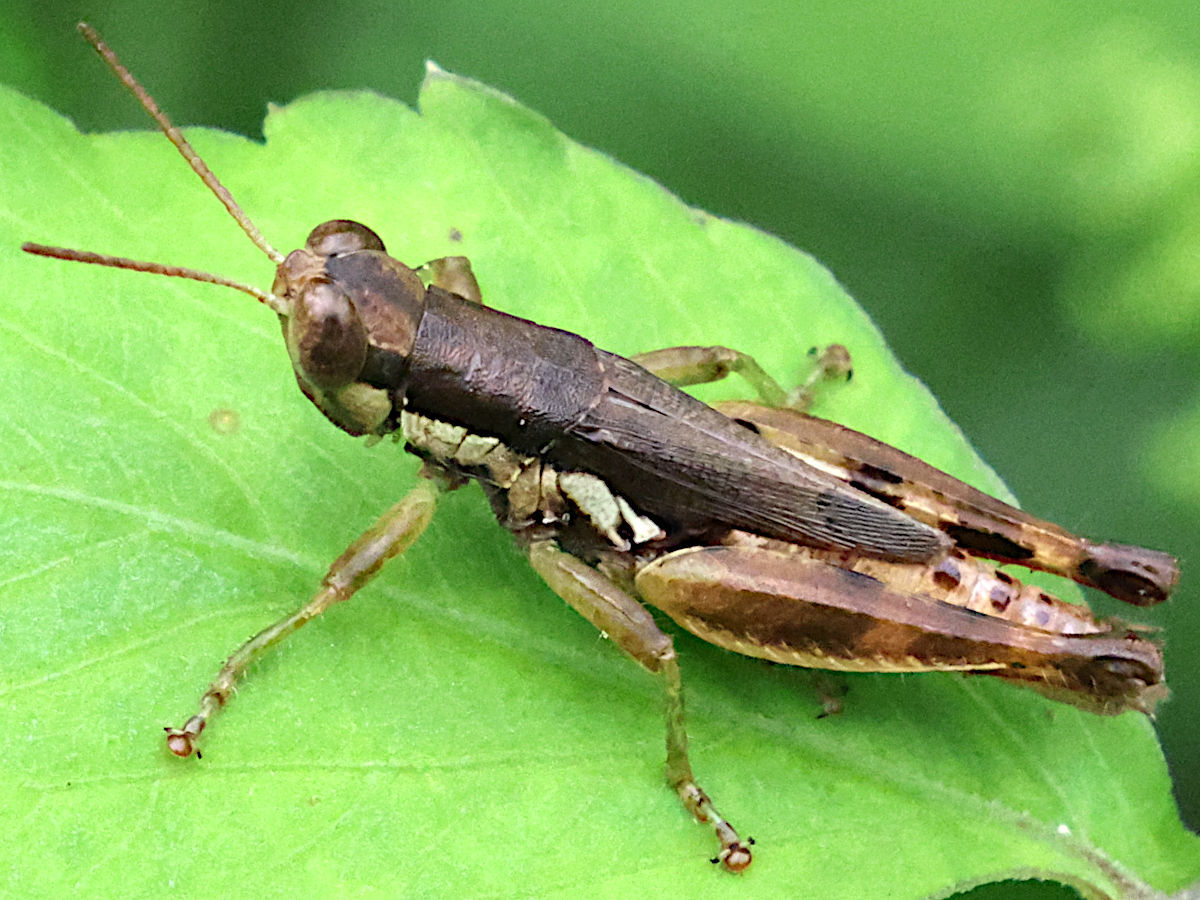
Pseudoxya diminuta (Short-winged Rice Grasshopper)

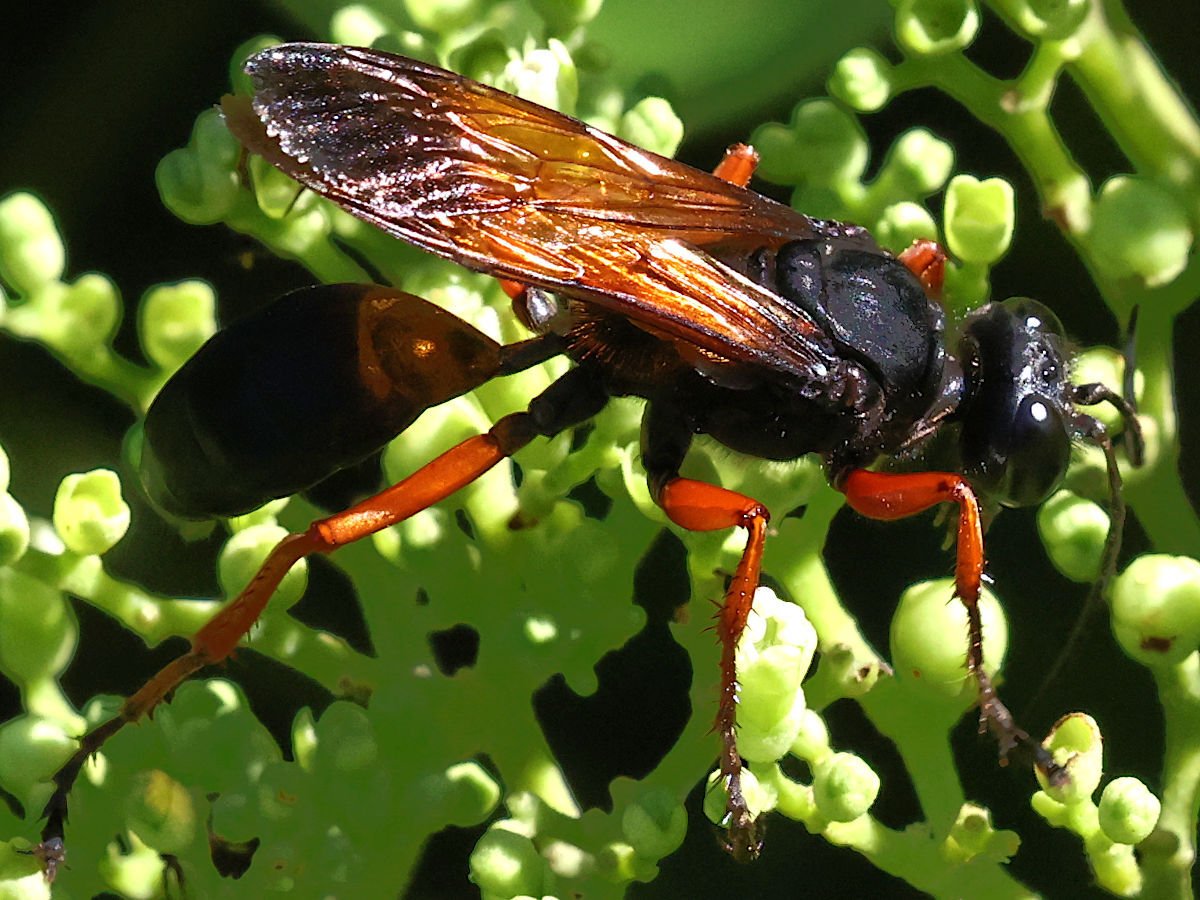
Sphex subtruncatus (thread-waisted wasp)

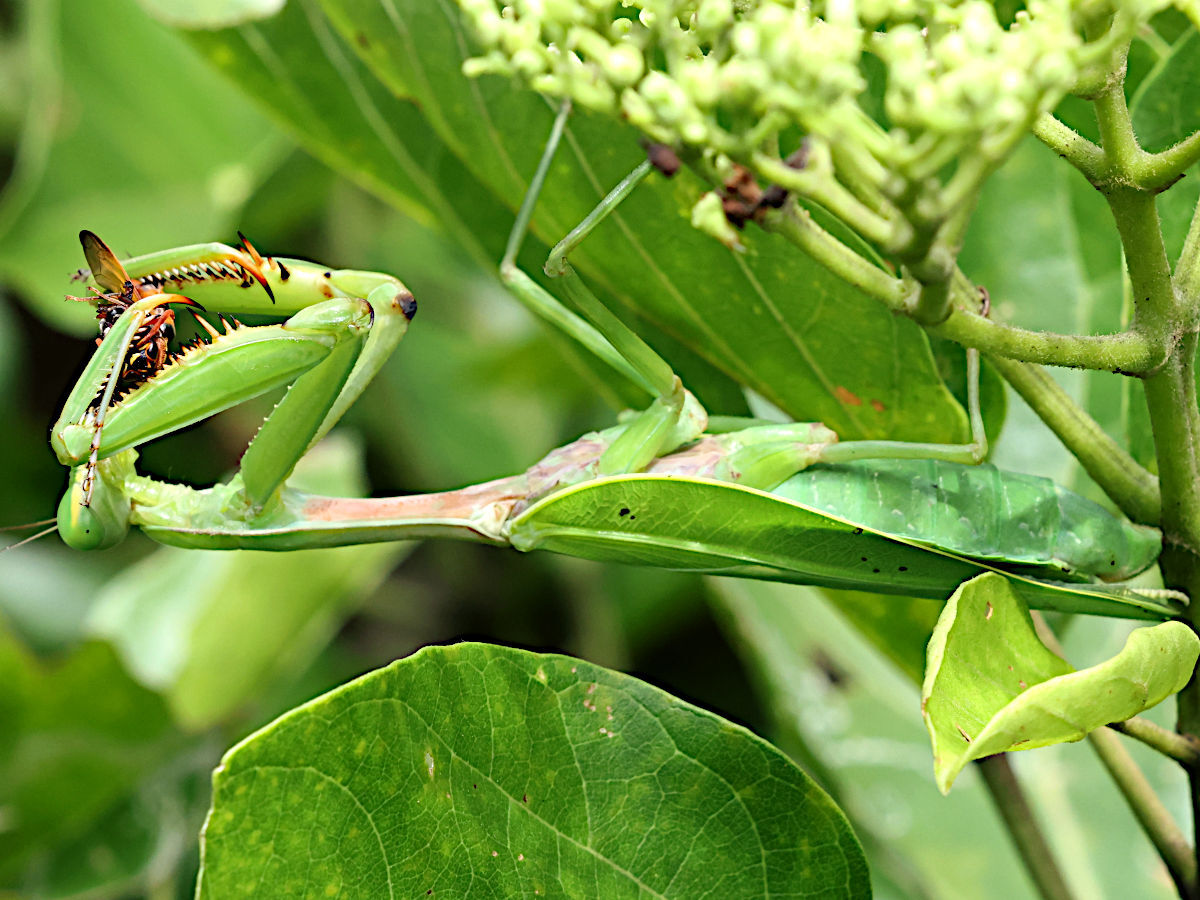
Titanodula formosana (Formosan Giant Mantis)
