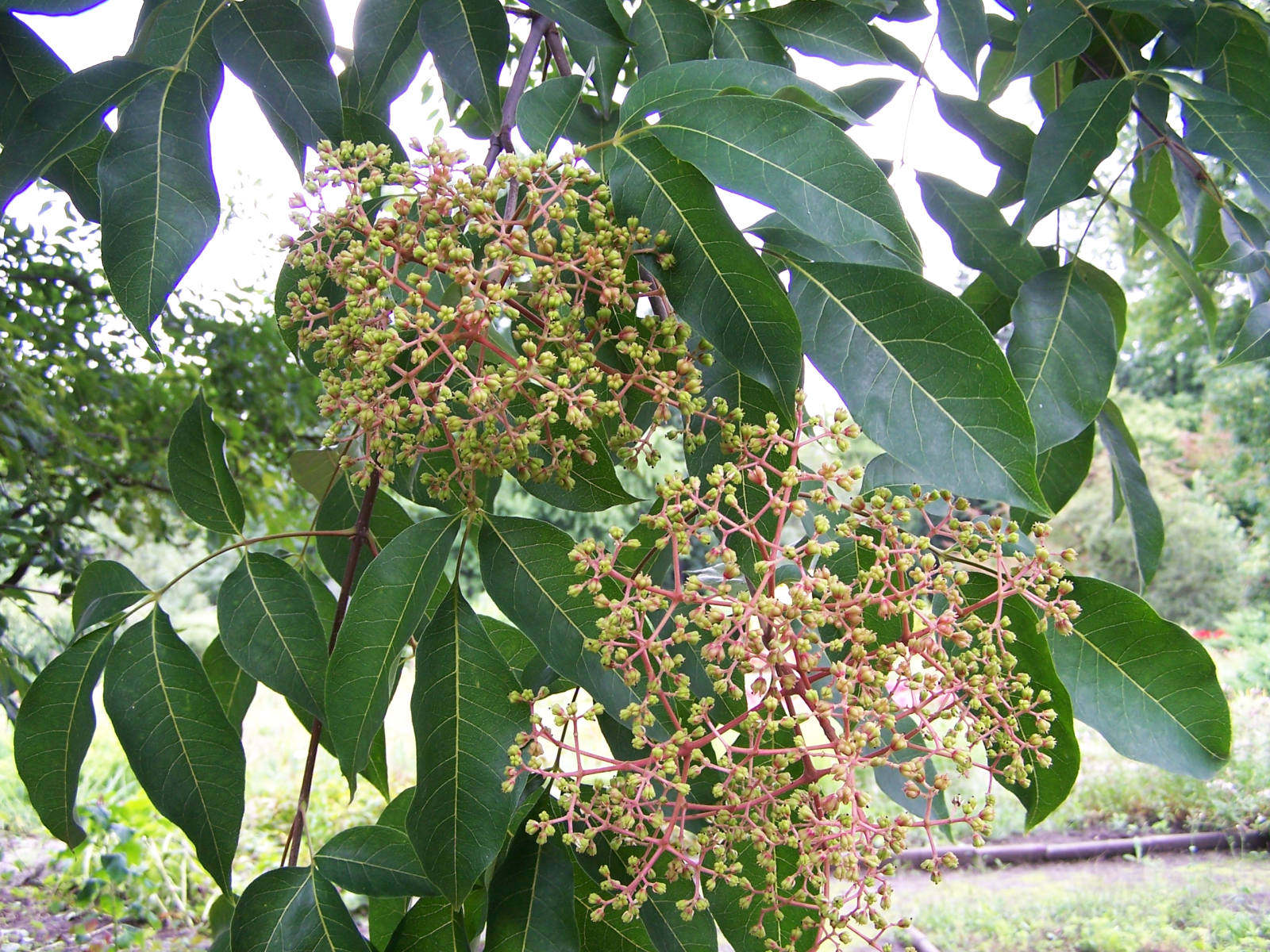

Scientific classification
- Kingdom: Plantae
- Clade: Tracheophytes
- Clade: Angiosperms
- Clade: Eudicots
- Clade: Rosids
- Order: Sapindales
- Family: Rutaceae
- Subfamily: Zanthoxyloideae
- Genus: Euodia; J.R.Forst. & G.Forst.

Species
- See text

Synonyms
- Evodia J.R.Forst. & G.Forst. (orth. var.)

= Euodia (plant) =

Genus of flowering plants

Euodia is a plant genus in the family Rutaceae. Euodia is sometimes misspelled as Evodia. The species now included in the genus Tetradium were previously included in Euodia, and may be commonly referred to as euodia.

== Fossil record ==
Fossil seeds of Euodia costata have been recovered from Eocene sediments at Hordle, Hants, southern England. A fossil species, Euodia lignita, has been described from Oligocene Brandon Lignite sediments in Vermont, United States.

== Species ==
- Euodia elleryana
- Euodia hortensis J.R.Forst. & G.Forst.
- Euodia hylandii
- Euodia lunuankenda
- Euodia macrocarpa
- Euodia pubifolia
- Euodia schullei Warb.
- Euodia simplicifolia
- Euodia tietaensis
- Euodia vitiflora

== Former species ==
- Euodia daniellii (Benn.) Hemsl., now Tetradium daniellii
- Euodia hupehensis: is now classed as Tetradium daniellii var. hupehensis
- Euodia ruticarpa, now Tetradium ruticarpum
- Euodia micrococca, now Melicope micrococca
- Euodia robusta, now Melicope hookeri
