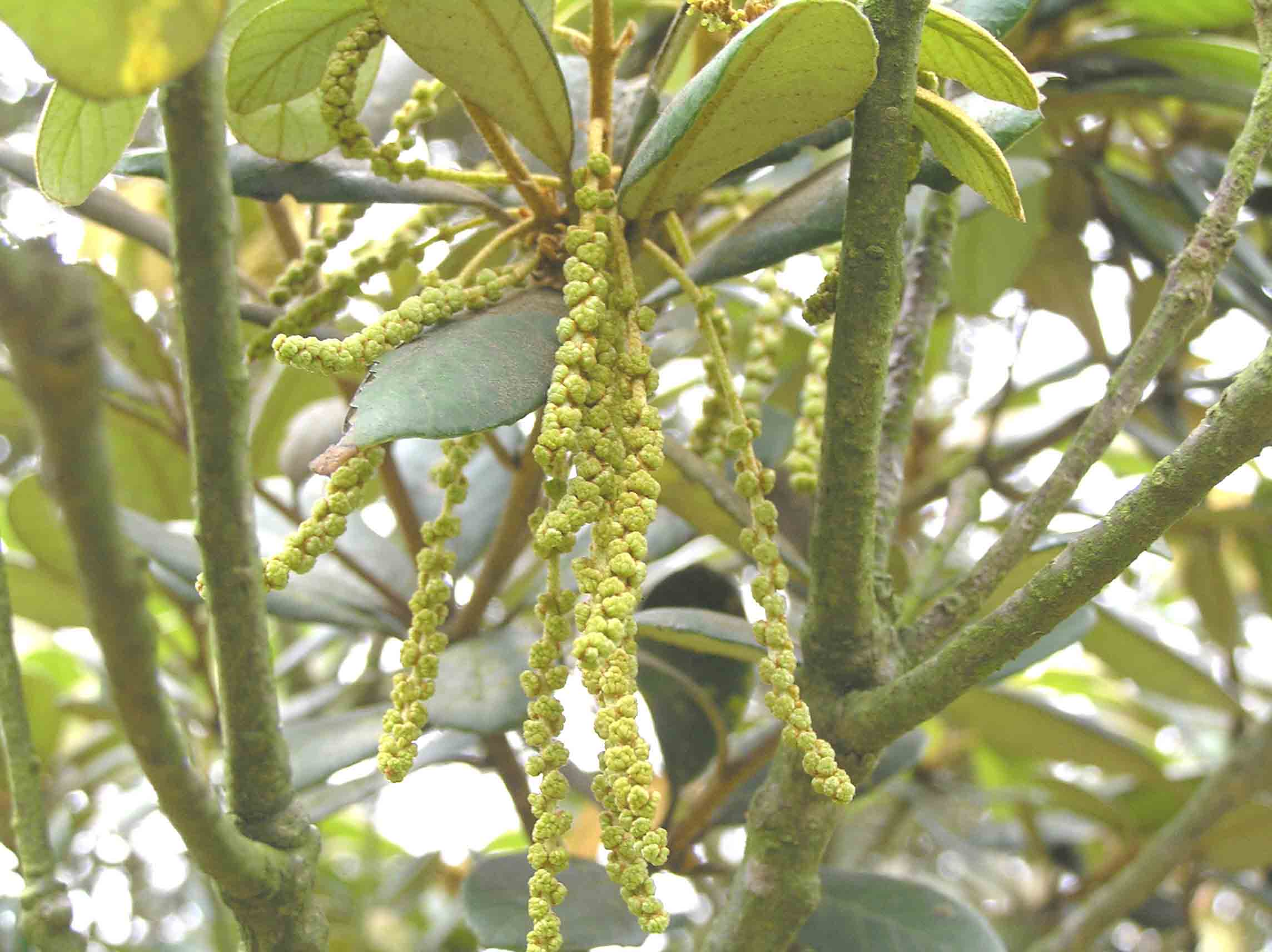

Conservation status
- Least Concern (IUCN 3.1)

Scientific classification
- Kingdom: Plantae
- Clade: Tracheophytes
- Clade: Angiosperms
- Clade: Eudicots
- Clade: Rosids
- Order: Fagales
- Family: Fagaceae
- Genus: Quercus
- Subgenus: Quercus subg. Cerris
- Section: Quercus sect. Cyclobalanopsis
- Species: Q. championii

Binomial name
- Quercus championii Benth.

Synonyms
- Cyclobalanopsis championii (Benth.) Oerst.

= Quercus championii =

Species of oak tree

Quercus championii is an uncommon species of tree in the family Fagaceae. It has been found only in Taiwan and southern China, in the Provinces of Fujian, Guangdong, Guangxi, Hainan, and Yunnan. It is placed in subgenus Cerris, section Cyclobalanopsis.

Quercus championii is a tree up to 20 meters tall, with a trunk up to 100 cm in diameter, grayish-brown twigs, and leaves as much as 13 cm long.

It was described from material collected in Hong Kong by John George Champion.
