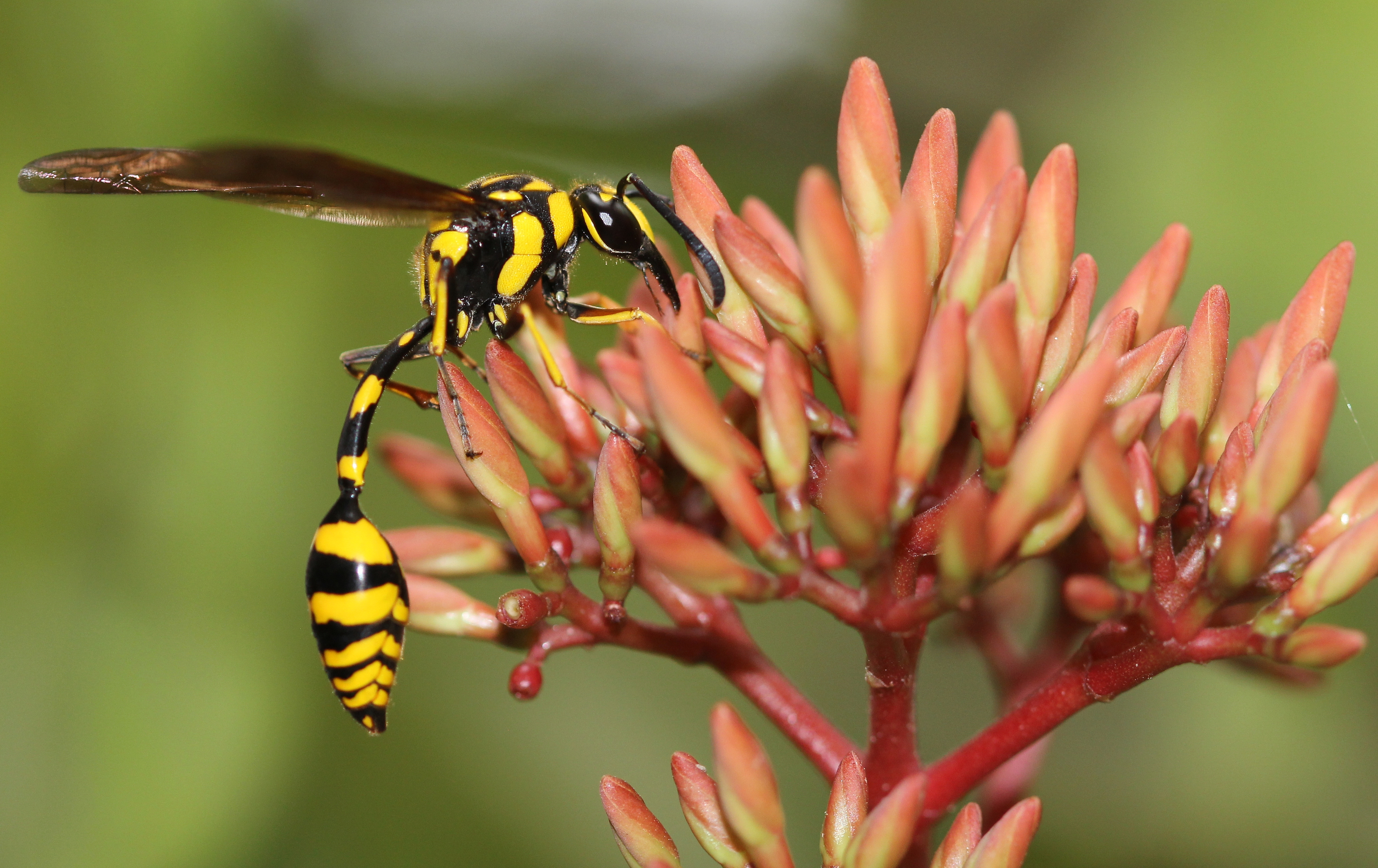
- Phimenes sp.

Scientific classification
- Kingdom: Animalia
- Phylum: Arthropoda
- Class: Insecta
- Order: Hymenoptera
- Family: Vespidae
- Subfamily: Eumeninae
- Genus: Phimenes; Giordani Soika, 1992

Type species
- Phimenes arcuatus (Fabricius, 1775)

Species
- See text

= Phimenes =

Genus of wasps

Phimenes is an Indomalayan and Australasian genus of potter wasps. The genus was formerly regarded as a synonym of Delta. The genus was separated from Eumenes by the Italian hymenopterist Antonio Giordani Soika when he elevated division IV of Eumenes, which Saussure had given the name Phi to, to full generic status. However, Giordani Soika noted that the name Phi was preoccupied by a subgenus of the New World polistine genus Mischocyttarus and he therefore chose to compound Phi with Eumenes into Phimenes as the name for the new taxon.

== Species ==
The following species are classified as being members of the genus Phimenes:

- Phimenes andamanicus (Zimmermann, 1931)
- Phimenes arcuatus (Fabricius, 1775)
- Phimenes curvatus (Saussure, 1856)
- Phimenes eremnus (Vecht, 1959)
- Phimenes flavopictus (Blanchard, 1845)
- Phimenes fulvipennis (Smith, 1856)
- Phimenes incola (Giordani Soika, 1935)
- Phimenes indosinensis (Vecht, 1959)
- Phimenes nicobaricus (Meade-Waldo, 1910)
- Phimenes pagdeni (Vecht, 1959)
- Phimenes perplexus (Smith, 1864)
- Phimenes rumphii (Vecht, 1959)
- Phimenes sciarus (Vecht, 1959)
- Phimenes solomonis (Vecht, 1959)
- Phimenes sparsipunctatus Gusenleitner, 2002
- Phimenes squalidus (Vecht, 1959)
- Phimenes transmarinus (Vecht, 1959)
- Phimenes violaceipennis (Vecht, 1959)
- Phimenes viridipennis (Vecht, 1959)
- Phimenes wieneckei (Vecht, 1959)
- Phimenes zamenes (Vecht, 1959)
- Phimenes zimmermanni (Giordani Soika, 1934)
