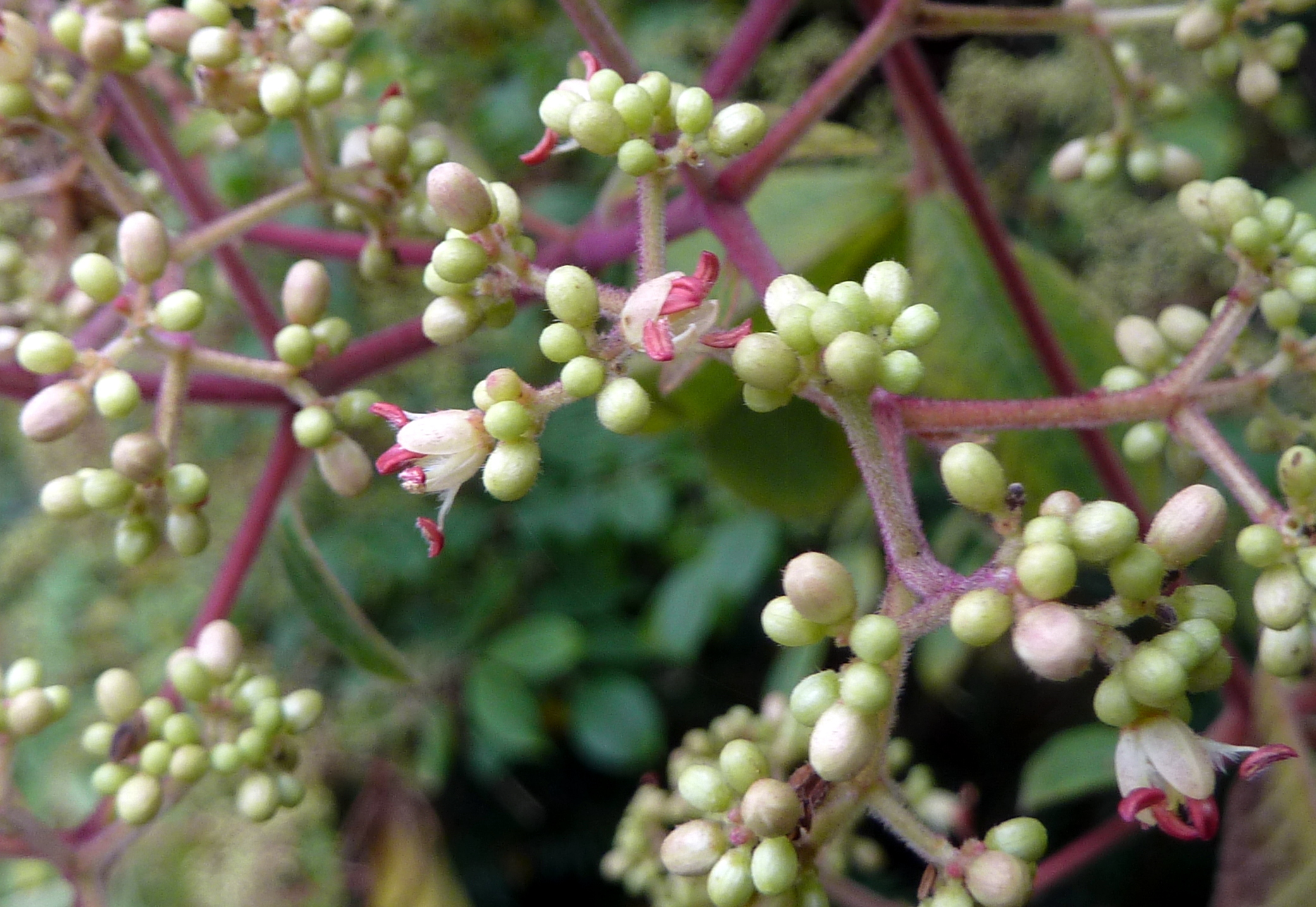
- Buds (approx. 2 mm) with some open flowers

Scientific classification
- Kingdom: Plantae
- Clade: Tracheophytes
- Clade: Angiosperms
- Clade: Eudicots
- Clade: Rosids
- Order: Sapindales
- Family: Rutaceae
- Genus: Tetradium
- Species: T. glabrifolium

Binomial name
- Tetradium glabrifolium (Champ. ex Benth.) T.G. Hartley

Synonyms
- Tetradium taiwanense (T. Yamaz.) T. Yamaz. Tetradium glabrifolium var. glaucum T. Yamazaki; Tetradium glabrifolium var. glaucum (Miq.) H. Ohba; Phellodendron burkillii Steenis; Megabotrya meliifolia Hance ex Walp. Eurycoma dubia Elmer; Euodia yunnanensis C.C. Huang; Euodia tonkinensis Engl. Euodia taiwanensis T. Yamaz. Euodia meliifolia (Hance ex Walp.) Benth. Euodia glauca Miq. Euodia glabrifolia (Champ.) N.P. Balakrishnan; Euodia glabrifolia (Champ.) D.D. Tao; Euodia glabrifolia (Champ. ex Benth.) C.C. Huang; Euodia fargesii Dode; Euodia balansae Dode; Euodia ailanthifolia Pierre; Boymia glabrifolia Champ. Ampacus meliifolia (Hance ex Walp.) Kuntze

= Tetradium glabrifolium =

Species of flowering plant

Tetradium glabrifolium is a species of plant in the family Rutaceae (tribe Zanthoxyleae), with many synonyms but no subspecies listed in the Catalogue of Life.
