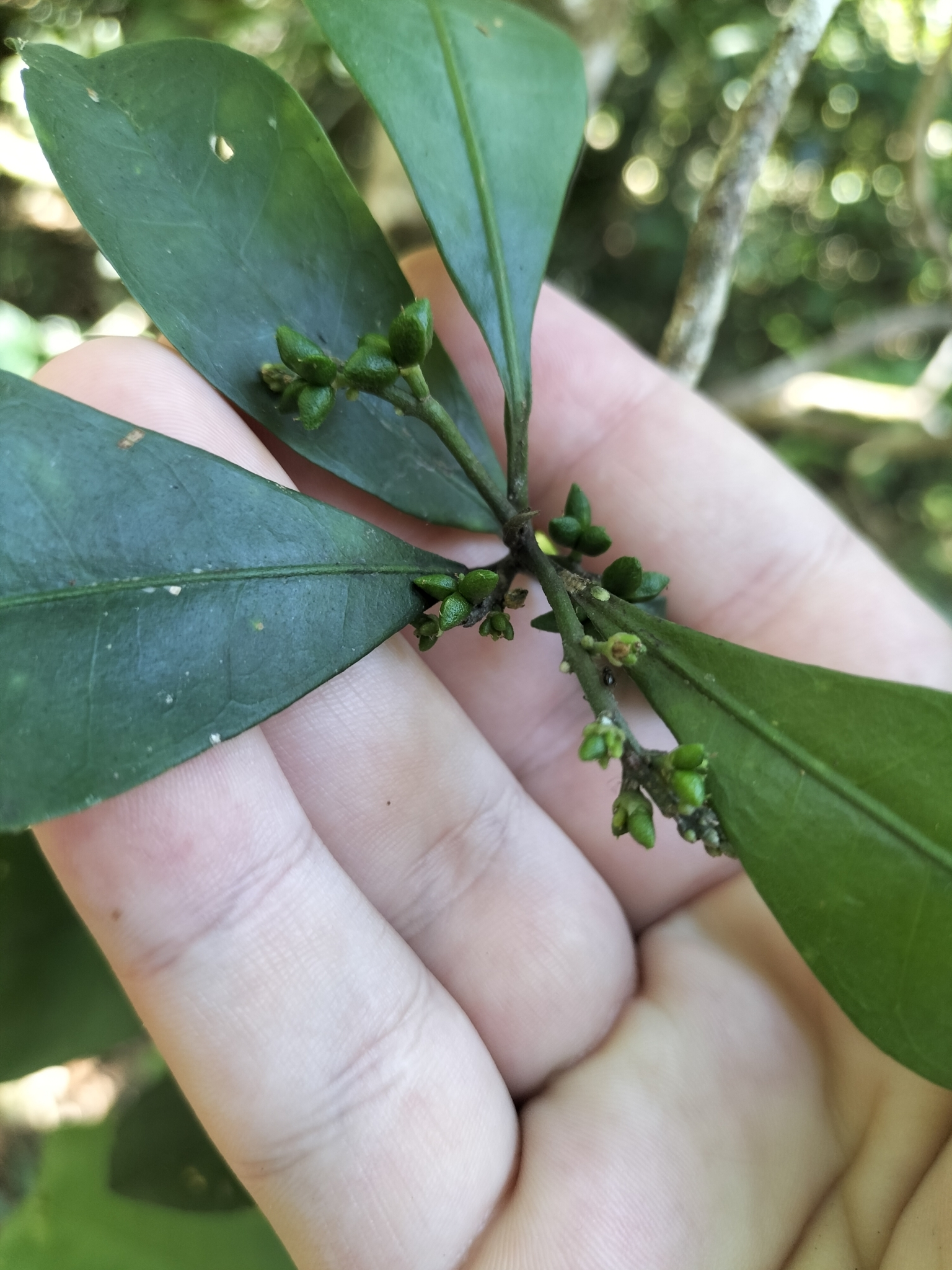
- Foliage, flowers and fruit

Conservation status
- Vulnerable (NCA)

Scientific classification
- Kingdom: Plantae
- Clade: Tracheophytes
- Clade: Angiosperms
- Clade: Eudicots
- Clade: Rosids
- Order: Sapindales
- Family: Rutaceae
- Genus: Euodia
- Species: E. hylandii

Binomial name
- Euodia hylandii T.G.Hartley

= Euodia hylandii =

Dwarf euodia

Species of flowering plant

Euodia hylandii, commonly known as dwarf euodia, is a shrub or small tree in the citrus family Rutaceae. It is endemic to northeastern Queensland, Australia, and inhabits the understorey of well developed rainforest. The range extends from Kutini-Payamu National Park to the Daintree River, and from the sea level to 550 m (1,800 ft). It was first described by the American botanist Thomas Gordon Hartley in 2001. Crushed leaves are said to resemble the scent of ants in the Iridomyrmex group. The plant is named in honour of the botanist Bernard Hyland.

== Conservation ==
This species is listed as vulnerable under the Queensland Government's Nature Conservation Act. As of 9 November 2024, it has not been assessed by the International Union for Conservation of Nature (IUCN).
