= Euodia macrocarpa =

Conservation status
- Vulnerable (IUCN 2.3)

Scientific classification
- Kingdom: Plantae
- Clade: Tracheophytes
- Clade: Angiosperms
- Clade: Eudicots
- Clade: Rosids
- Order: Sapindales
- Family: Rutaceae
- Genus: Euodia
- Species: E. macrocarpa

Binomial name
- Euodia macrocarpa King

Species of tree

Euodia macrocarpa is a species of plant in the family Rutaceae. It is a tree endemic to Peninsular Malaysia. It is threatened by habitat loss.
