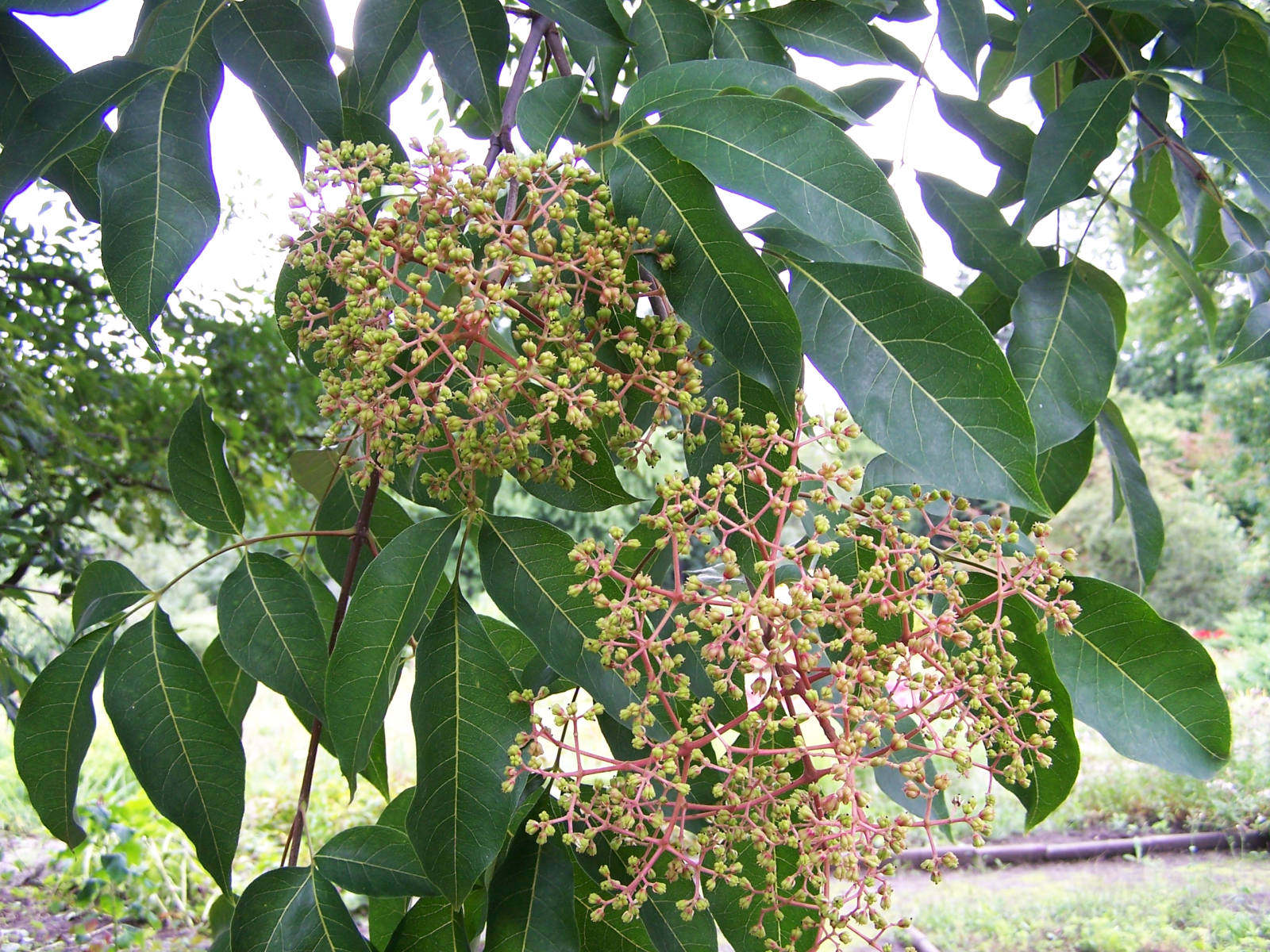
- Tetradium daniellii T. G. Hartley

Scientific classification
- Kingdom: Plantae
- Clade: Embryophytes
- Clade: Tracheophytes
- Clade: Spermatophytes
- Clade: Angiosperms
- Clade: Eudicots
- Clade: Rosids
- Order: Sapindales
- Family: Rutaceae
- Subfamily: Zanthoxyloideae
- Genus: Tetradium; Lour.

Species
- See text

Synonyms
- Megabotrya Hance; Philagonia Blume

= Tetradium =

Genus of plants

Tetradium is a genus of trees in the family Rutaceae. It occurs in temperate to tropical East Asia. In older books, the genus was often included in the related genus Euodia (sometimes written, "Evodia" from Latin spelling), but that genus is now restricted to tropical species. In cultivation in English-speaking countries, they are known as Euodia, Evodia, or Bee bee tree.

They are attractive trees with deciduous glossy pinnate leaves. Tetradium daniellii (syn. T. hupehensis) develops a smooth gray bark that resembles that of a beech tree and grows to a height of 20 metres (66 ft). The leaves resemble the foliage of an ash tree and are a glossy dark green in summer. In fall there is little color change and leaves tend to drop green to yellow-green. The tree is covered in late July and August with masses of large flat white to gray cluster of small white flowers, particularly valued when few other tree-size plants are flowering. It attracts large numbers of bees and is sought after by beekeepers as a source of late summer honey. The flowers produce clusters of seed that is present from late August through November. The seeds start as bright red capsules that when fully ripe open to expose shiny black buckshot seed as Autumn progresses. The small, red-to-black berries are popular with many birds.

Tetradium species are used as food plants by the larvae of some Lepidoptera species including Aenetus scotti and Endoclita damor.

The genus is also closely related to Melicope and is sometimes included within it. Melicope elleryana is sometimes referred to as Evodia, or Euodia.

== Species ==
- Tetradium austrosinense - China & n. Vietnam
- Tetradium calcicola (Chun ex C.C.Huang) T.G.Hartley - endemic China
- Tetradium cymosum Wall. ex Royle
- Tetradium daniellii (Benn.) T.G.Hartley - China & Korea
- Tetradium fraxinifolium (Hook.) T. G. Hartley - India, Indo-China, China
- Tetradium glabrifolium (Champ. ex Benth.) T. G. Hartley - Indo-China, China, Malesia
- Tetradium ruticarpum (A.Juss.) T.G.Hartley - India to NE Asia
- Tetradium sambucinum (Blume) T.G.Hartley (Syn.: Philagonia sambucina Blume)
- Tetradium trichotomum Lour. - Indo-China, China
