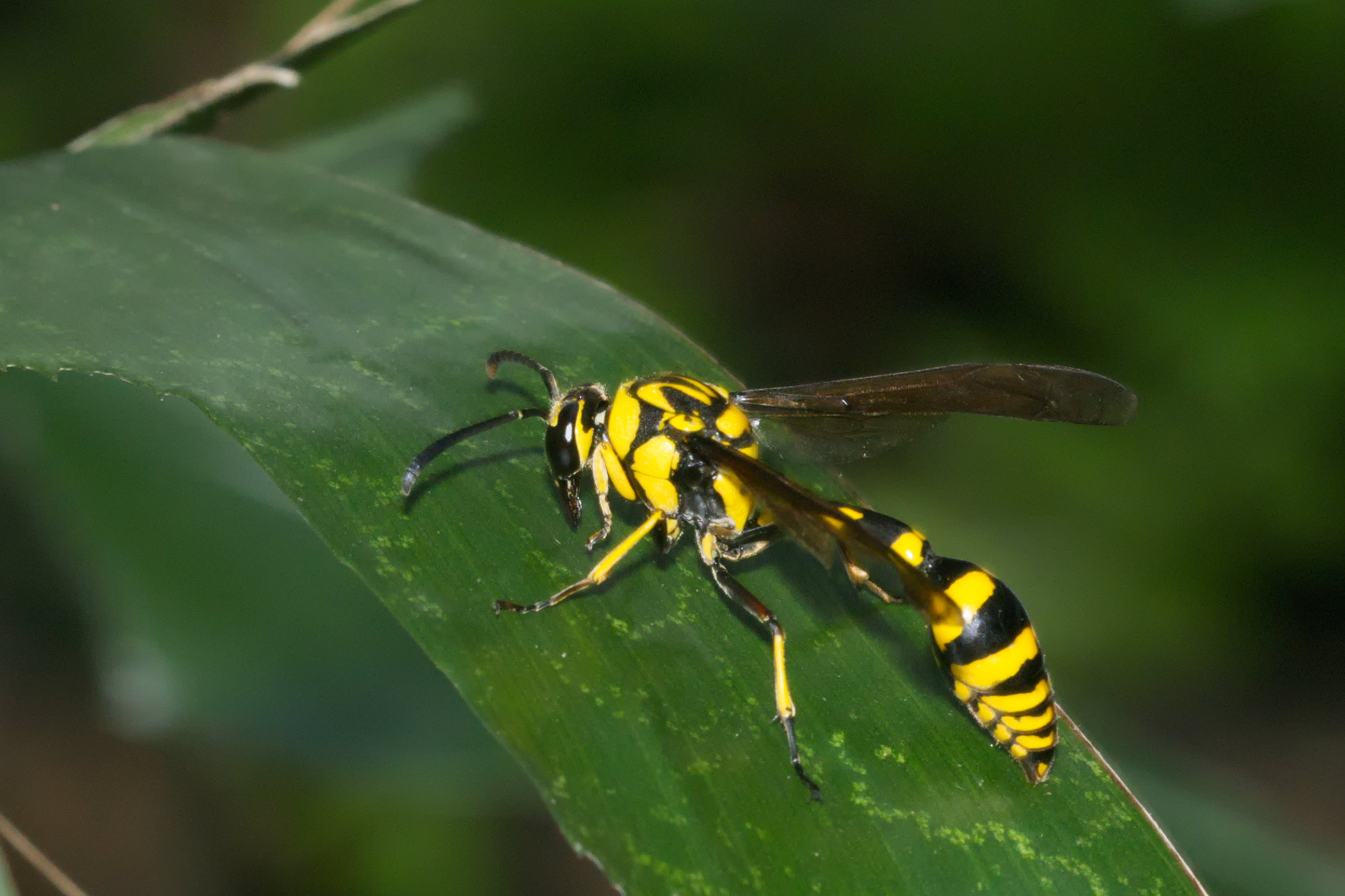
- From India
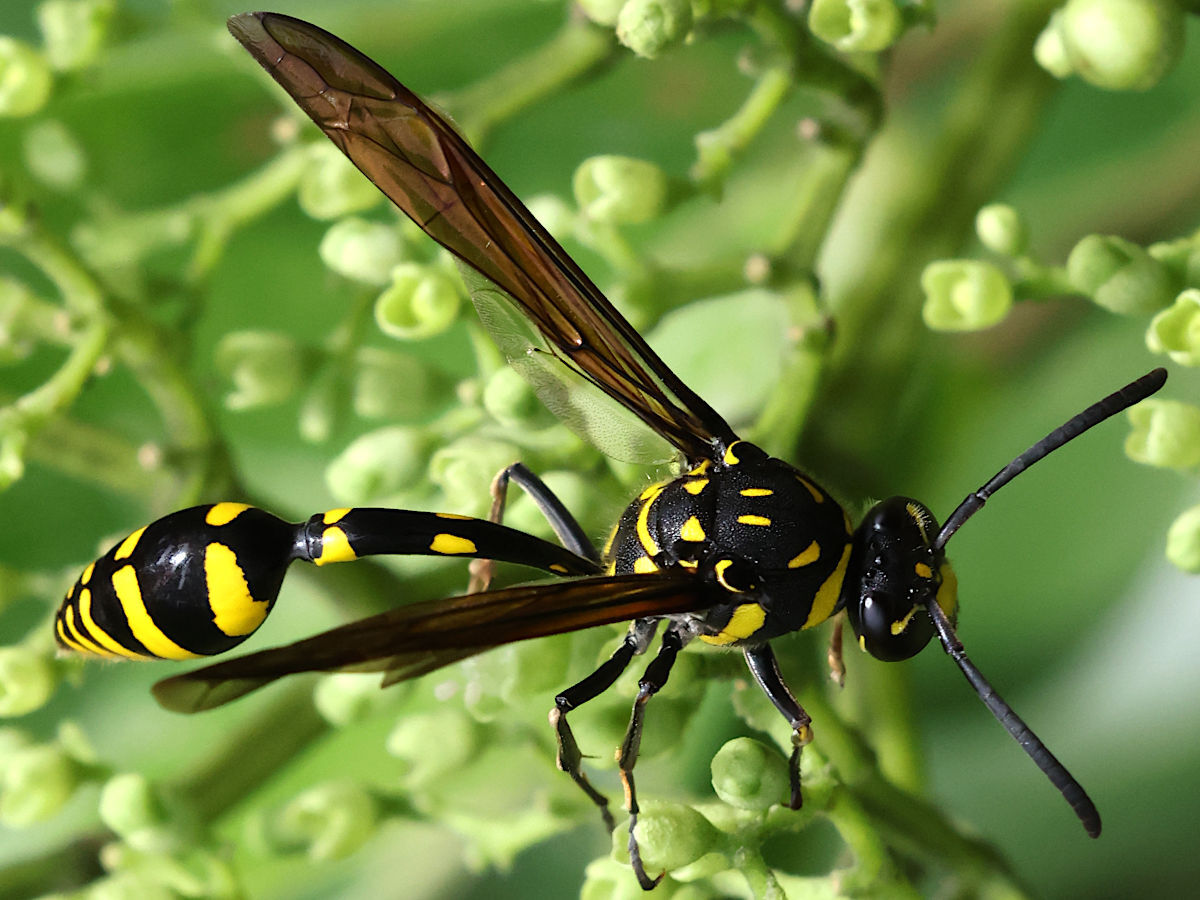
- From Taiwan

Scientific classification
- Kingdom: Animalia
- Phylum: Arthropoda
- Clade: Pancrustacea
- Class: Insecta
- Order: Hymenoptera
- Family: Vespidae
- Genus: Phimenes
- Species: P. flavopictus

Binomial name
- Phimenes flavopictus (Blanchard, 1849)

Synonyms
- Eumenes flavopictus Blanchard, 1849; Phi flavopictum (Blanchard, 1849)

= Phimenes flavopictus =

Species of wasp

Phimenes flavopictus is a species of potter wasp found in India, Sri Lanka, Nepal, China, Myanmar, Thailand, Malaysia, Singapore, and Indonesia. Females build rounded mud chambers, or pots, for their eggs which are provisioned with caterpillars.

Considerable variation in the distribution and patterns of yellow and black are seen across their range, particularly in South East Asia. In South Asia, there are two other species that are in the same genus. In P. flavopictus, the second gastral tergite has two yellow spots at the base on the black background forming a broken band. Towards the apex the bands are more narrowly interrupted. A related species P. andamanicum is found on the Andamans that has the thorax (mesosoma) nearly all black while P. nicobaricum has the second tergite all yellow. The species was described by Blanchard under the genus Eumenes in 1849 although many authors have assumed that the publication was made in 1845.
