= John George Champion =

English soldier, botanist, and explorer (1815–1854)

John George Champion (1815–1854) was an English soldier, botanist, and explorer.

== Life ==
He was gazetted ensign in the 95th regiment in 1831, and embarked for foreign service in 1838, having then attained the rank of captain. After a stay in the Ionian Isles, his duties took him to Ceylon, and thence in 1847 to Hong Kong. During his time at the Ionian islands of Kerkyra (Corfu) and Kefalonia (Cefalonia), he published short notes on insect natural history under the pseudonym "Ionicus" (or "Jonicus"). He collected a great variety of plants from China, and he came back to England in 1850.

He came back in front of the Crimea combat, commanding the 95th Regiment, and he died in the Scutari hospital, on 30 November 1854 due to injuries received while he commanded his regiment in the battle of Inkerman.

God save his soul, brave soldier.

== Honours ==
Over seventy species have been named in his honour, including:

- (Acanthaceae) Ecbolium championii Kuntze
- (Acanthaceae) Justicia championii T.Anderson ex Benth.
- (Aristolochiaceae) Aristolochia championii Merr. & Chun
- (Boraginaceae) Ehretia championii Wight & Gardner ex C.B.Clarke
- (Fagaceae) Cyclobalanopsis championii Oerst., Quercus championii Benth.
- (Rubiaceae) Neurocalyx championii Benth. ex Thwaites
- (Magnoliaceae) Lirianthe championii

== Sources ==
- Champion, John George (1855). A sketch of the life of the late Lieut.-Colonel Champion, of the 95th Regiment : with extracts from his correspondence. OCLC 905690788.
- Troyer, JR. 1979. The natural history publications of John George Champion (1815–1854), soldier and botanist. JSBNH 9 (2): 125–131 (abril de 1979)
