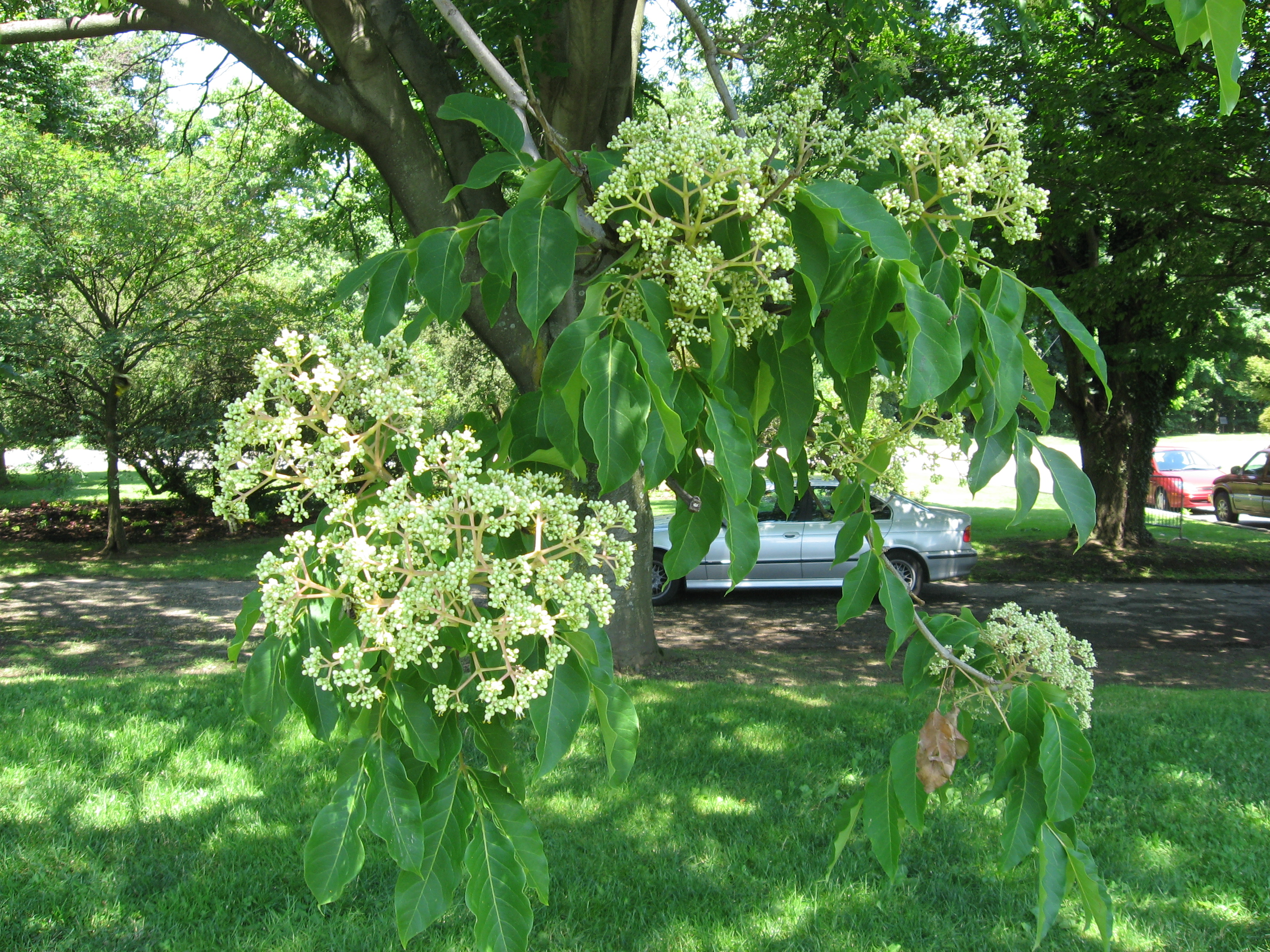

Scientific classification
- Kingdom: Plantae
- Clade: Tracheophytes
- Clade: Angiosperms
- Clade: Eudicots
- Clade: Rosids
- Order: Sapindales
- Family: Rutaceae
- Genus: Tetradium
- Species: T. daniellii

Binomial name
- Tetradium daniellii (Benn.) T.G.Hartley

= Tetradium daniellii =

Species of flowering plant

Tetradium daniellii, the bee-bee tree or Korean evodia, is a species of flowering plant in the family Rutaceae. It is native to Korea and southwestern China.

Tetradium daniellii var. hupehensis was formerly classed as Euodia hupehensis

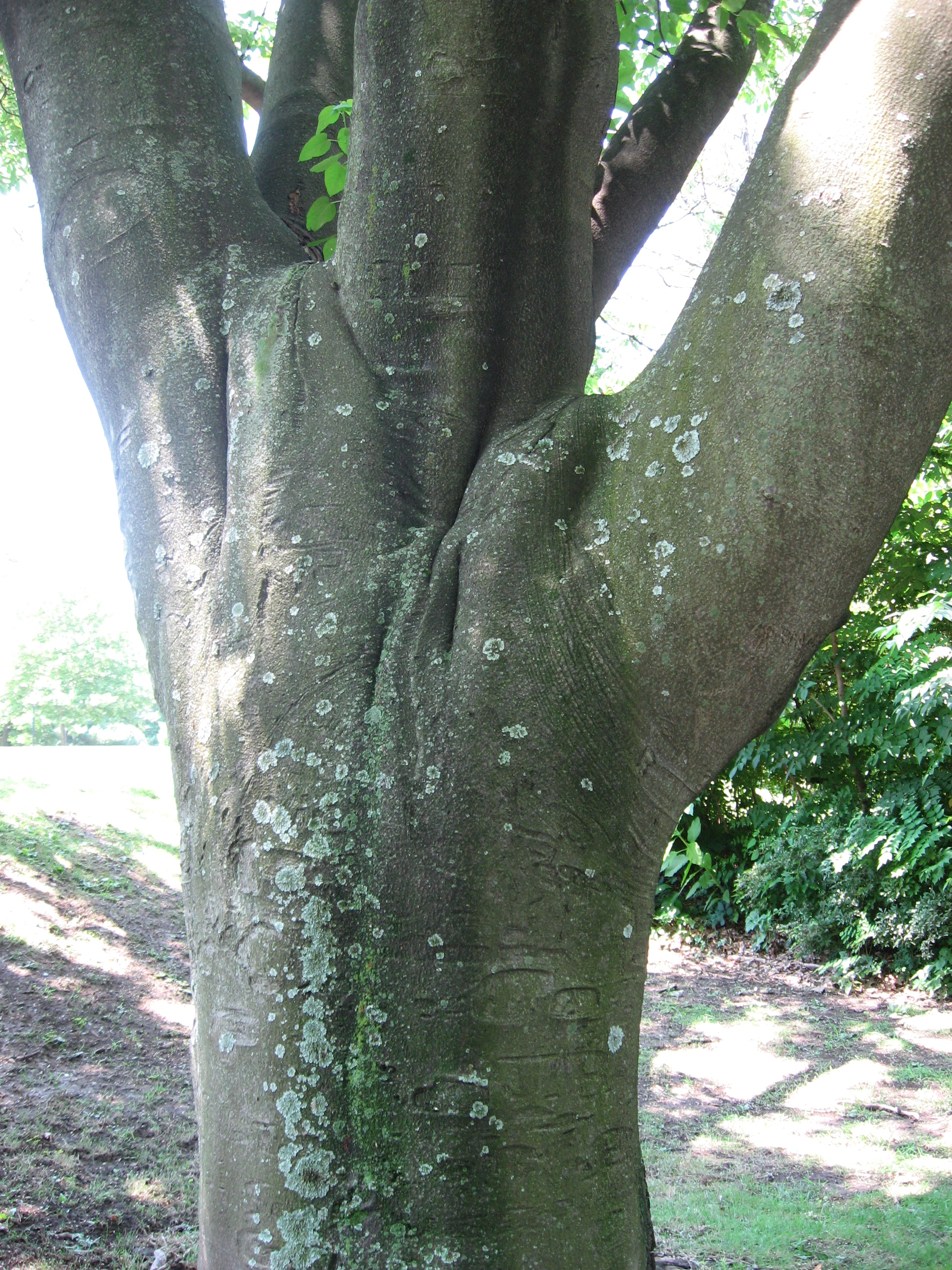
Bark of T. daniellii

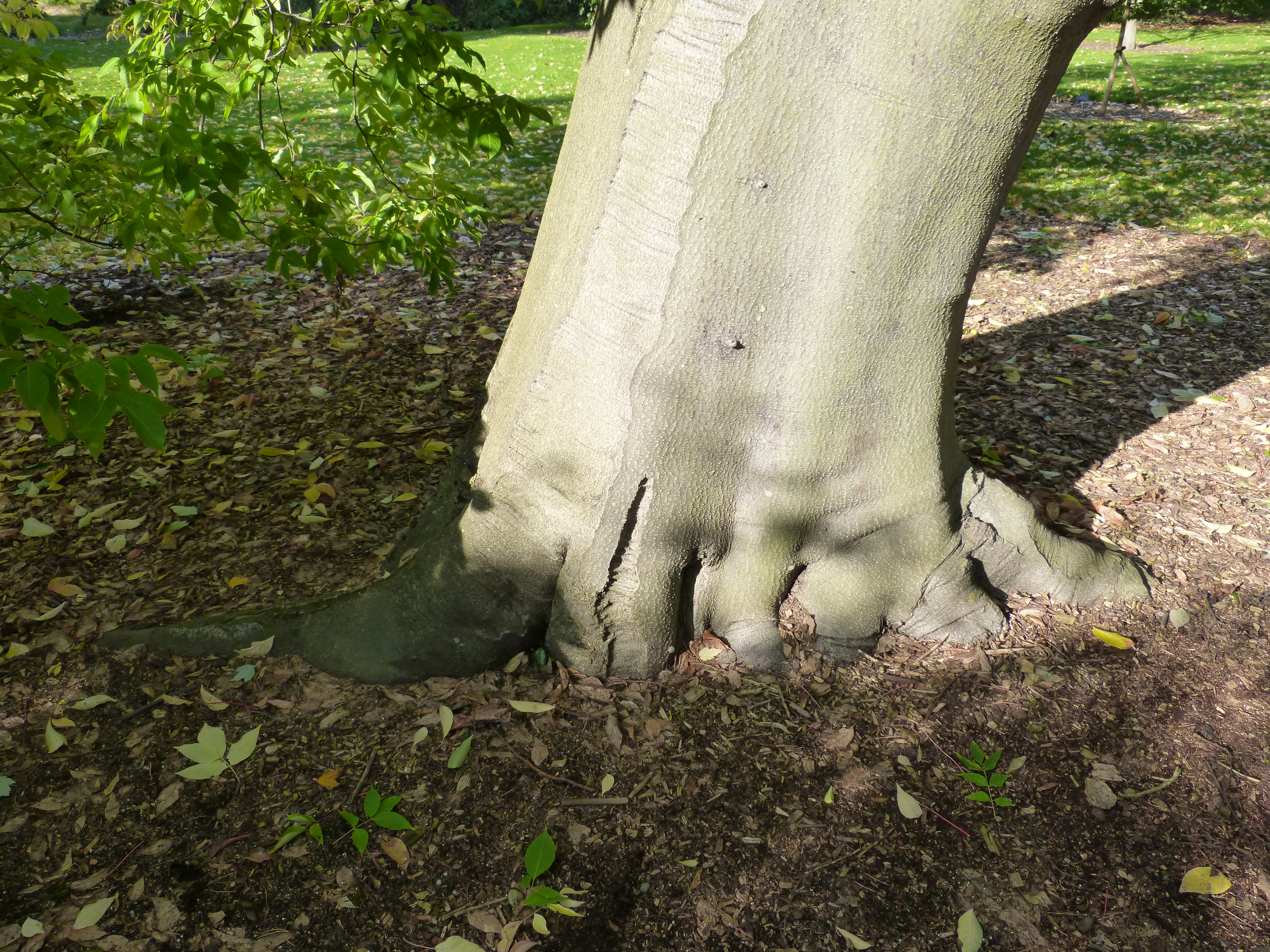

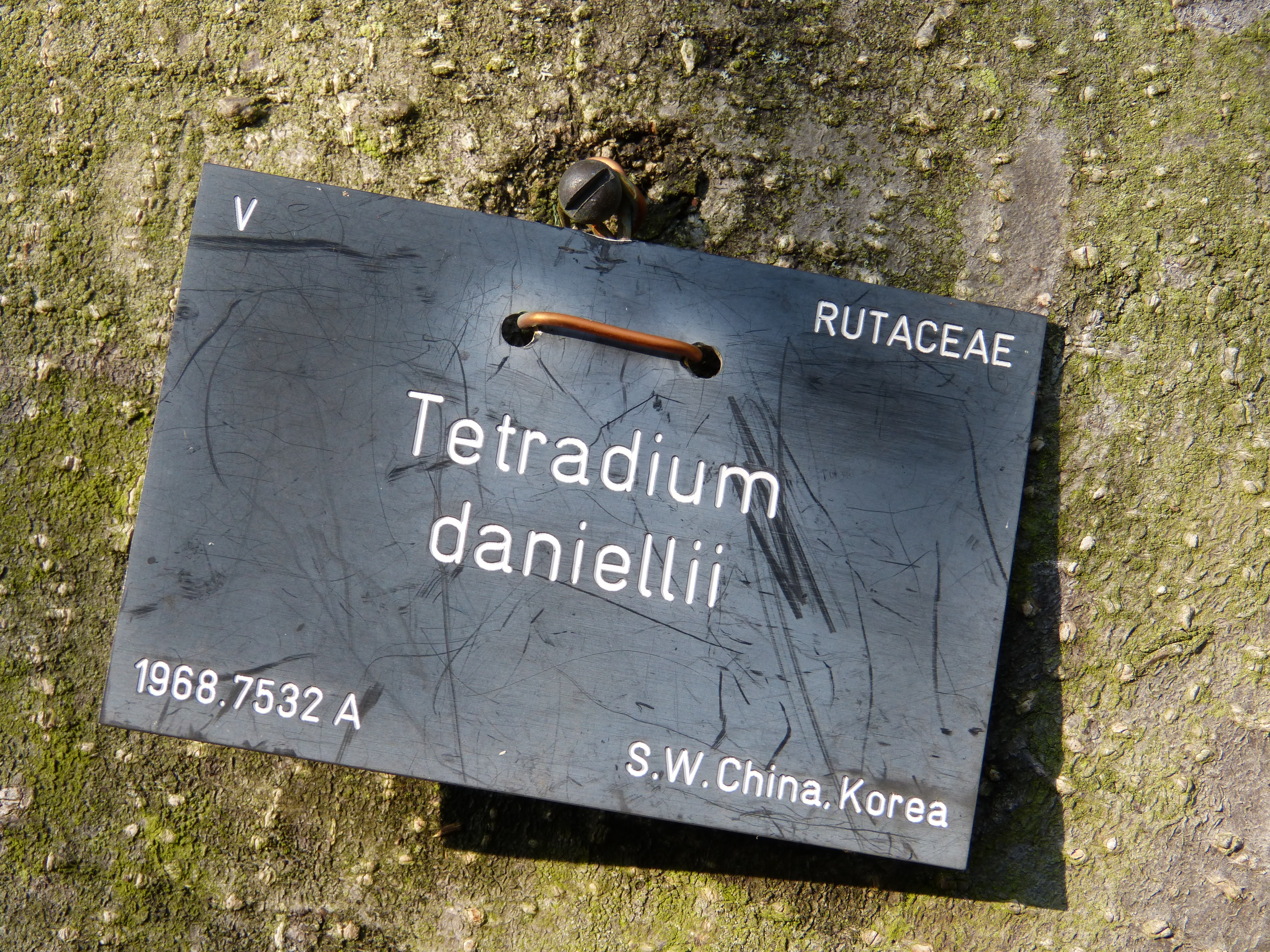

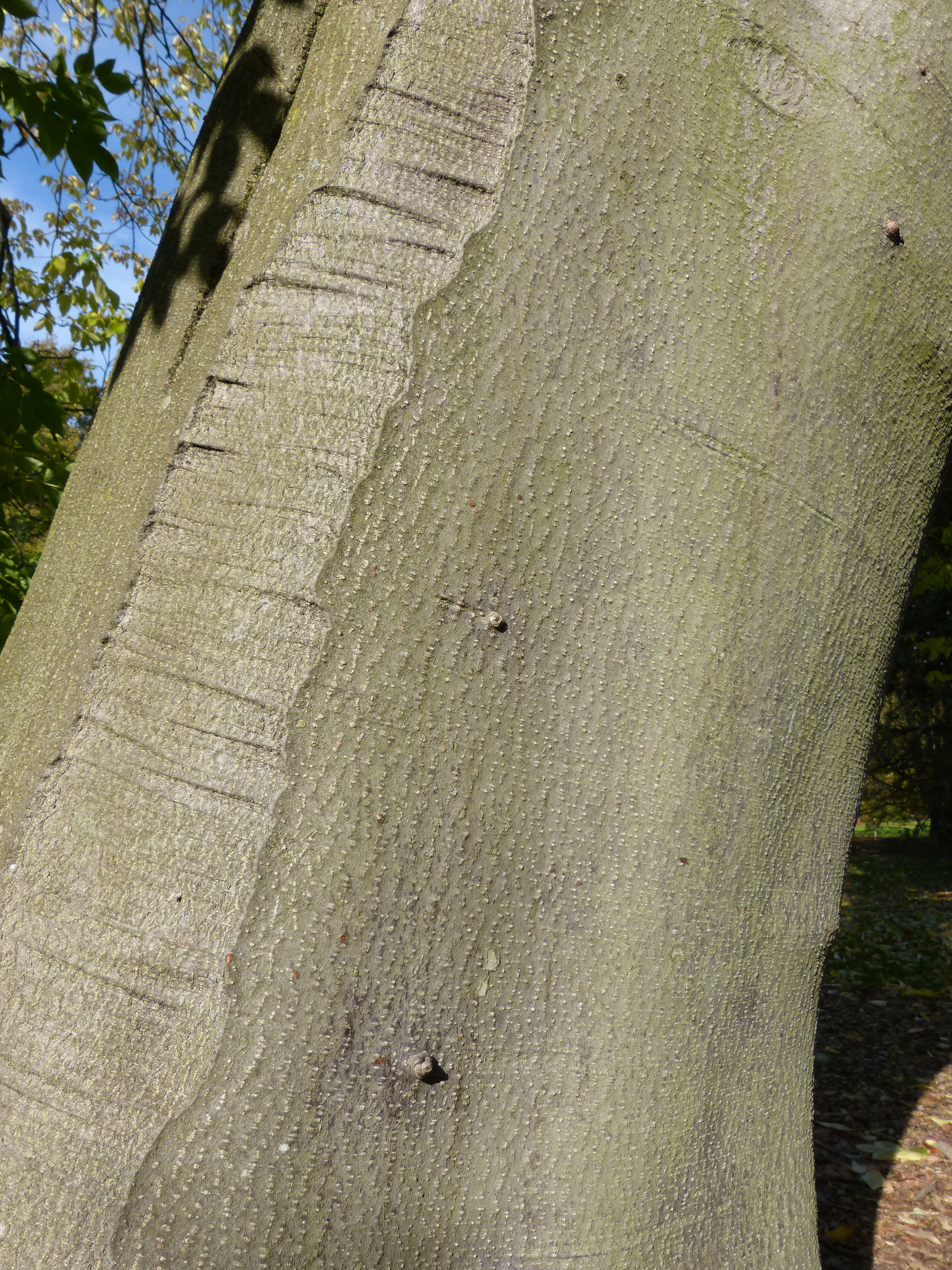
