= Natural gum =

Thickening agent

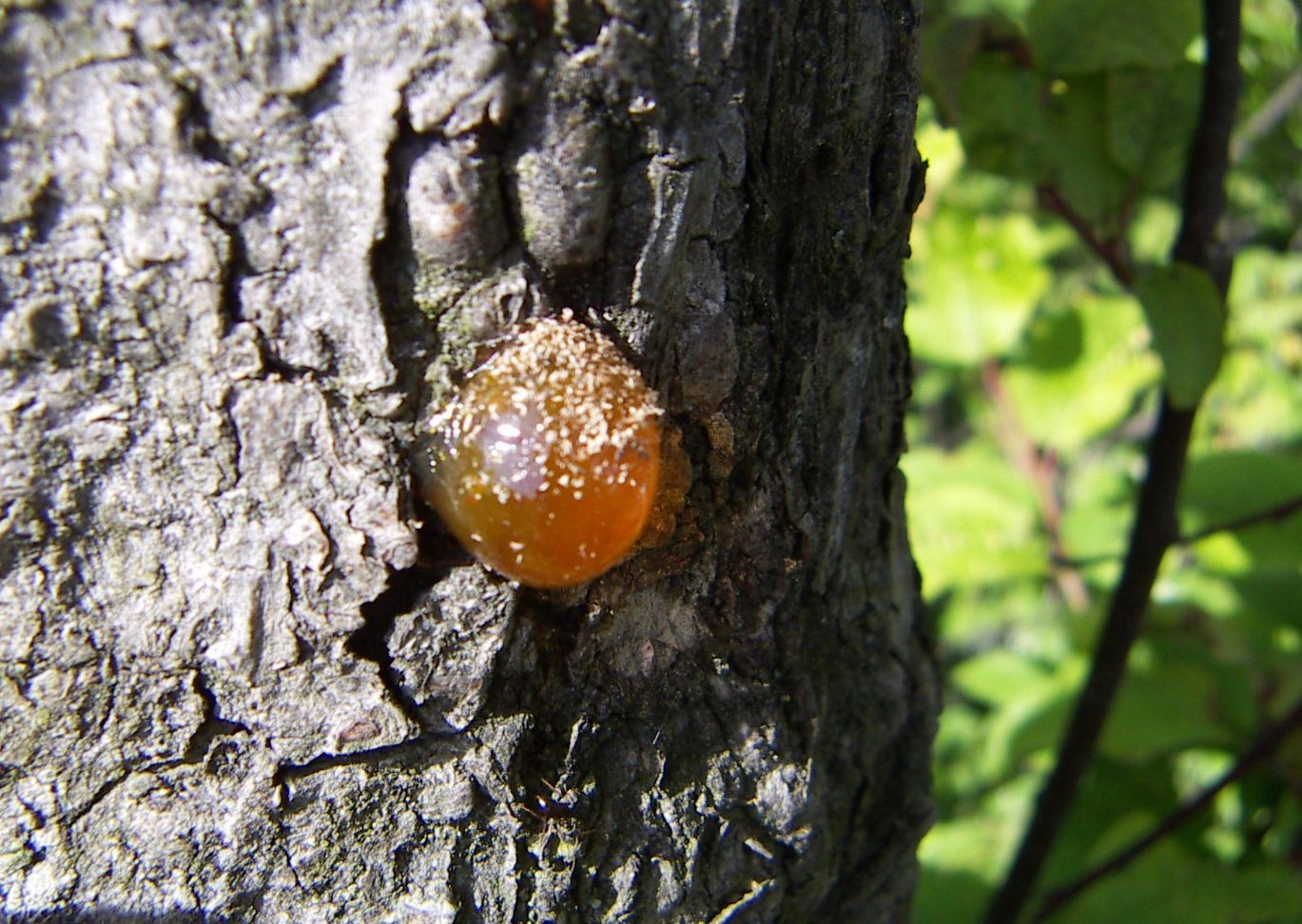
Natural gum from plum tree

Natural gums are polysaccharides of natural origin, capable of causing a large increase in a solution's viscosity, even at small concentrations. They are mostly botanical gums, found in the woody elements of plants or in seed coatings.

== Human uses ==
Gums are used in the food industry as thickening agents, gelling agents, emulsifying agents, and stabilizers, in other industrial adhesives, binding agents, crystal inhibitors, clarifying agents, encapsulating agents, flocculating agents, swelling agents, foam stabilizers, etc. When consumed by humans, many of these gums are fermented by the microbes that inhabit the lower gastrointestinal tract (microbiome) and may influence the ecology and functions of these microscopic communities.

== Commercial significance ==
Humans have used natural gums for various purposes, including chewing and the manufacturing of a wide range of products. Before the invention of synthetic equivalents, trade in gum formed part of the economy in places such as the Arabian peninsula (hence the name "gum arabic") and West Africa.

=== Peach gum ===
Peach gum, the solidified resin from peach and Chinese wild peach trees, is a natural ingredient that has seen a recent increase in popularity due to claims about collagen content and skin improvement, though many of these claims lack scientific evidence. It has a long history of consumption in China, where it is commonly used in sweet soups, desserts, and beverages.

Historically, its curative qualities have been detailed in classical Chinese medical literature for treating urinal infections, quenching thirst, and relieving stress.

== Examples ==
Natural gums can be classified as extracted from natural sources or manufactured. They can also be classified as uncharged or ionic polymers (polyelectrolytes). Examples include (with E number food additive code):

Source	Classification	Natural gum	E number
Seaweeds	Polyelectrolytes	Agar	E406
Seaweeds	Polyelectrolytes	Alginic acid	E400
Seaweeds	Polyelectrolytes	Sodium alginate	E401
Seaweeds	Polyelectrolytes	Carrageenan	E407
Sap of Acacia trees	Polyelectrolytes	Gum arabic	E414
Sap of Anogeissus trees	Polyelectrolytes	Gum ghatti	
Sap of Astragalus shrubs	Polyelectrolytes	Gum tragacanth	E413
Sap of Sterculia trees	Polyelectrolytes	Karaya gum	E416
Guar beans	Uncharged	Guar gum	E412
Seeds of the carob tree	Uncharged	Locust bean gum	E410
Oat or barley bran	Uncharged	Beta-glucan	
Sap of Dipterocarpaceae trees	Uncharged	Dammar gum	
Konjac plant	Uncharged	Glucomannan	E425
Plantago plant	Uncharged	Psyllium seed husks	
Seeds of the tara tree	Uncharged	Tara gum	E417
Produced by bacterial fermentation	Polyelectrolytes	Gellan gum	E418
Produced by bacterial fermentation	Polyelectrolytes	Xanthan gum	E415
Neem tree		Neem gum	
