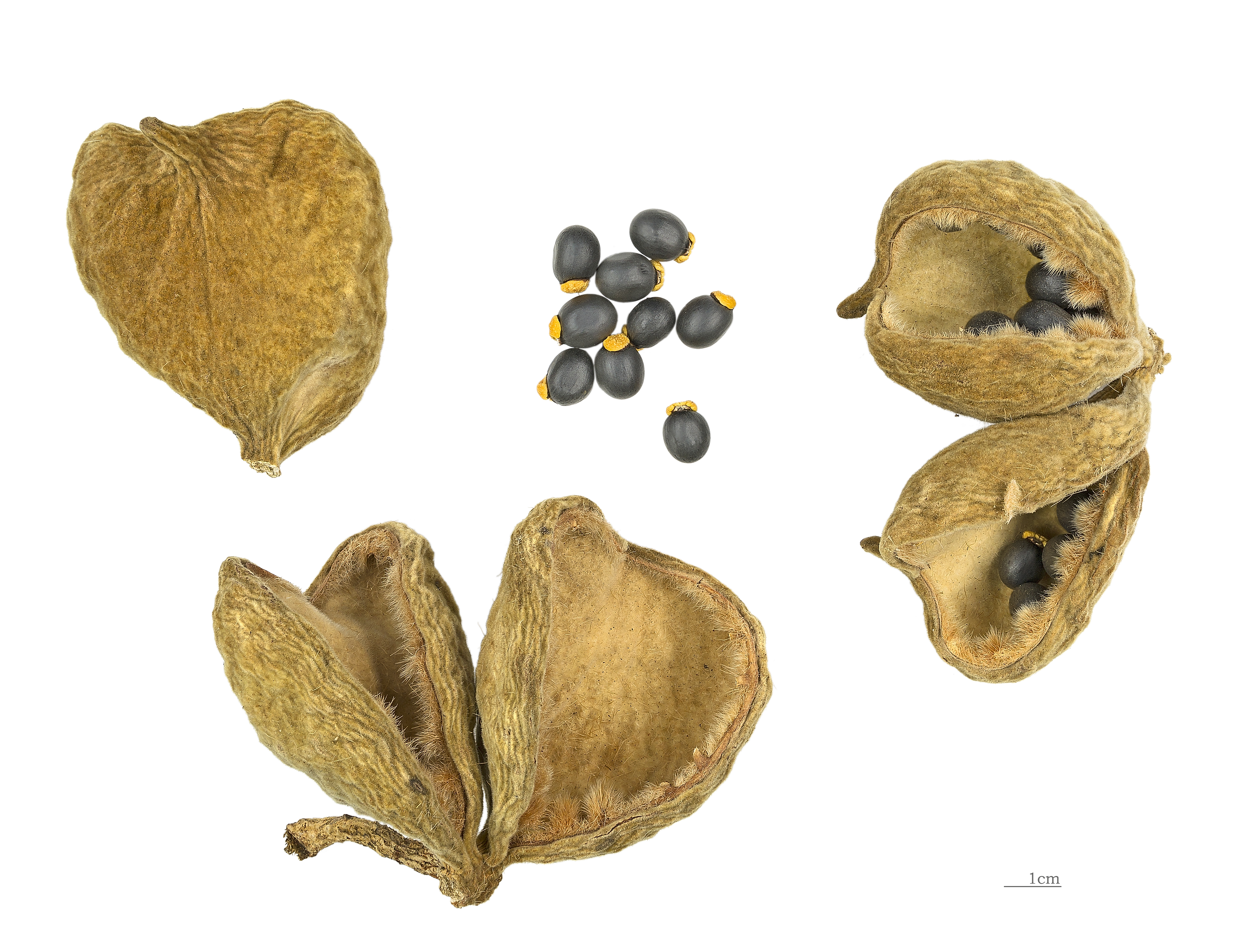
- Nuts and seeds

Conservation status
- Least Concern (IUCN 3.1)

Scientific classification
- Kingdom: Plantae
- Clade: Tracheophytes
- Clade: Angiosperms
- Clade: Eudicots
- Clade: Rosids
- Order: Malvales
- Family: Malvaceae
- Genus: Sterculia
- Species: S. setigera

Binomial name
- Sterculia setigera Delile

Synonyms
- Clompanus tomentosa (Schott & Endl.) Kuntze; Cola tomentosa Schott & Endl.; Sterculia cinerea Schweinf.; Sterculia hartmanniana Schweinf.; Sterculia tomentosa Guill. & Perr.

= Sterculia setigera =

Species of deciduous tree

Sterculia setigera is a deciduous tree species within the Malvaceae family. It commonly occurs in the Sahelo-Sudan and Guinea savannah zones of Tropical Africa. Among the Hausa people it is known as Kukkuki and Boɓori among Fulani people of Nigeria. It is an important tree crop in Senegal as Gum karaya obtained from the woody species is exported from the country.

== Description ==
A deciduous tree that is capable of reaching 18 meters in height, it has an open spreading crown with buttressed base, its grey purple bark peels off in thin, irregular scales leaving pale patches, while a slash reveals a fibrous, brownish to red inner bark and a white exudate.

Leaves are simple and alternate in arrangement, nerves palmately arranged at base with leaves 5 entire or pointed lobes; leaf-blade is ovate to orbicular in outline, upper surface tends to be stellate and tomentose.

Inflorescence is raceme type, calyx, 5 lobed, up to 12 mm in diameter, outer surface is green while inner surface is purple-red. The flowering period begins towards the end of the dry season between the months of February and April. Fruit is a sessile follicle, 6–10 cm long, oblong in shape, grey-green or brown in color and many seeded, follicle can stay on tree even when seeds falls off.

== Distribution ==
Occurs from Senegal eastwards to Sudan and Ethiopia and in Angola, found in the savanna ecological zones, frequently on hill or rocky soils and in shallow gritty soils.

== Chemistry ==
Tests on stem bark extracts of the plant isolated the chemical compound, lupeol and a class of Procyanidin trimers. The sugar properties of the gum obtained from the species consisting of D-galacturonic acid, L-rhamnose, D-galactose is quite similar to those obtained from Sterculia Urens.

== Uses ==
Seeds are eaten by nomadic groups in Northern Nigeria. A wide spread species, it has multi-purpose functions in various local communities. A decoction of stem bark extracts are used as part of an herbal regimen to treat skin ailments and infections, fever, diarrhea and toothache.
