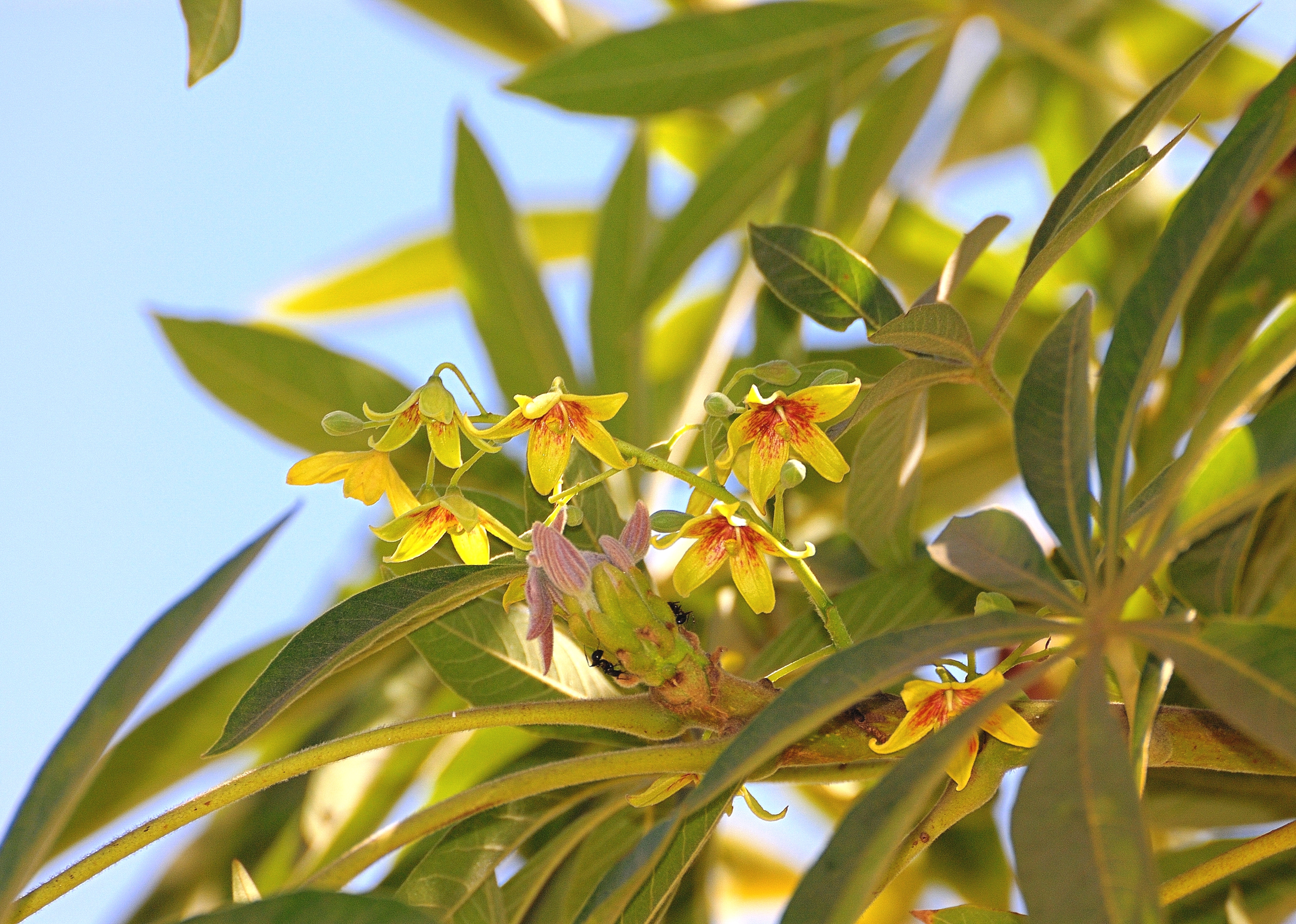

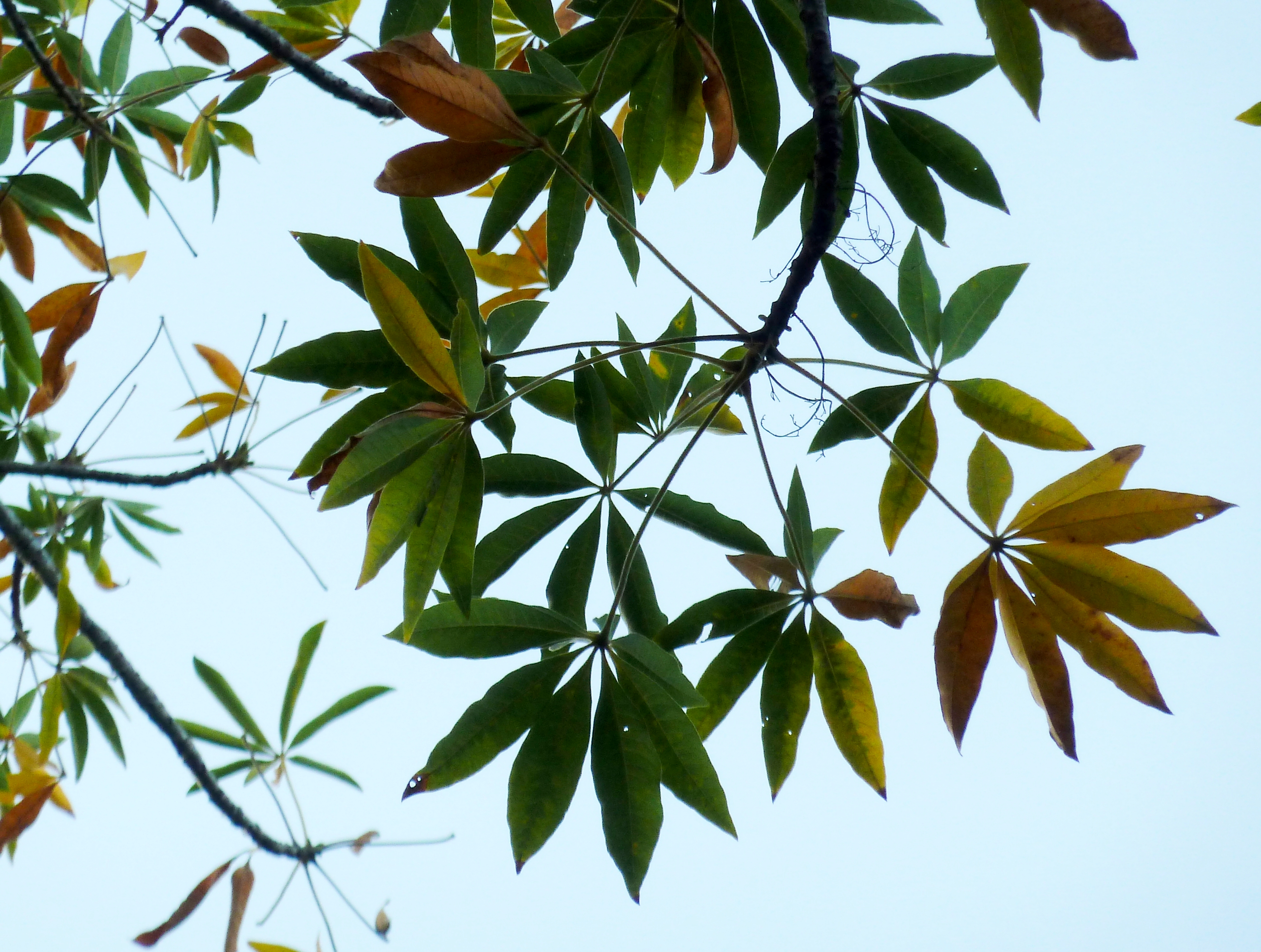

Conservation status
- Least Concern (IUCN 3.1)

Scientific classification
- Kingdom: Plantae
- Clade: Tracheophytes
- Clade: Angiosperms
- Clade: Eudicots
- Clade: Rosids
- Order: Malvales
- Family: Malvaceae
- Genus: Sterculia
- Species: S. murex

Binomial name
- Sterculia murex Hemsl.

= Sterculia murex =

Lowveld chestnut

Species of tree

Sterculia murex Hemsl. or lowveld chestnut is a southern African tree in the family Malvaceae, and the subfamily Sterculioideae. It has a very limited distribution in the lowveld of eastern Mpumalanga. After S. alexandri it is the most southern representative of the genus in Africa. Kew currently recognises some 92 species of Sterculia, confined to the tropics and slightly beyond at low elevations.

== Habit ==
First described by the botanist William Botting Hemsley in 1894, this species grows to about 10 metres in height with a trunk of some 30 cm in diameter covered in thick, greyish-brown bark, becoming almost black with age, and cracking in a rectangular pattern. Its unusual spiny fruits and palmately compound leaves make this an easily identifiable tree. It was illustrated by Cythna Letty in Flowering Plants of South Africa, vol. 32, plate no. 1279.

== Fruit ==
Five carpels are joined, forming the spokes of a wheel some 30 cm in diameter. They are woody and densely studded with hard, blunt spines, dehiscing on one side to reveal large (25 mm long), black seeds, which are rich in oil and, after roasting, are a valuable food source. Stinging hairs, common in the Malvaceae, coat the interior of the carpels and these may irritate skin and eyes. The carpels have a superficial resemblance to the Northern Hemisphere Chestnut. Each cluster of five fruits comes from a single yellow and red flower one inch (2.5 cm) in diameter.

== Gallery ==
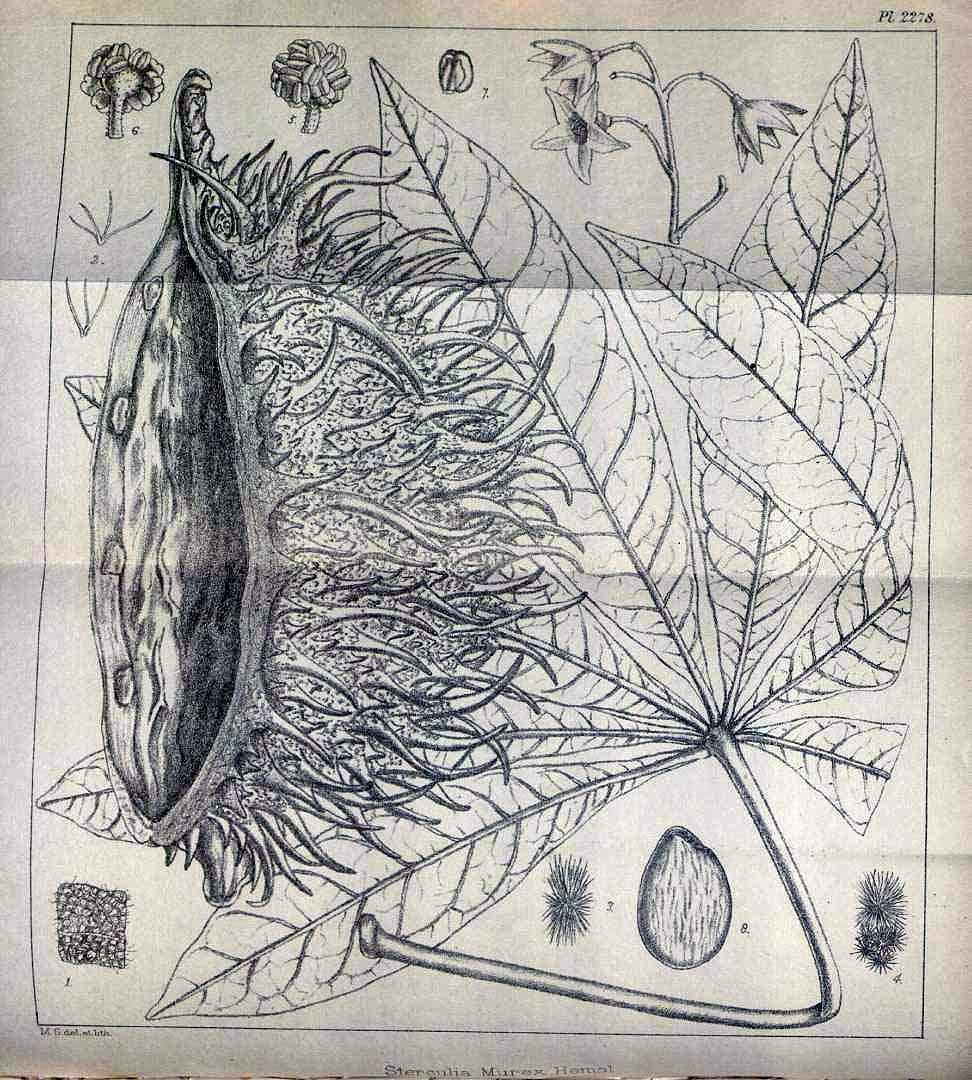
Plate 2278 from Icones plantarum

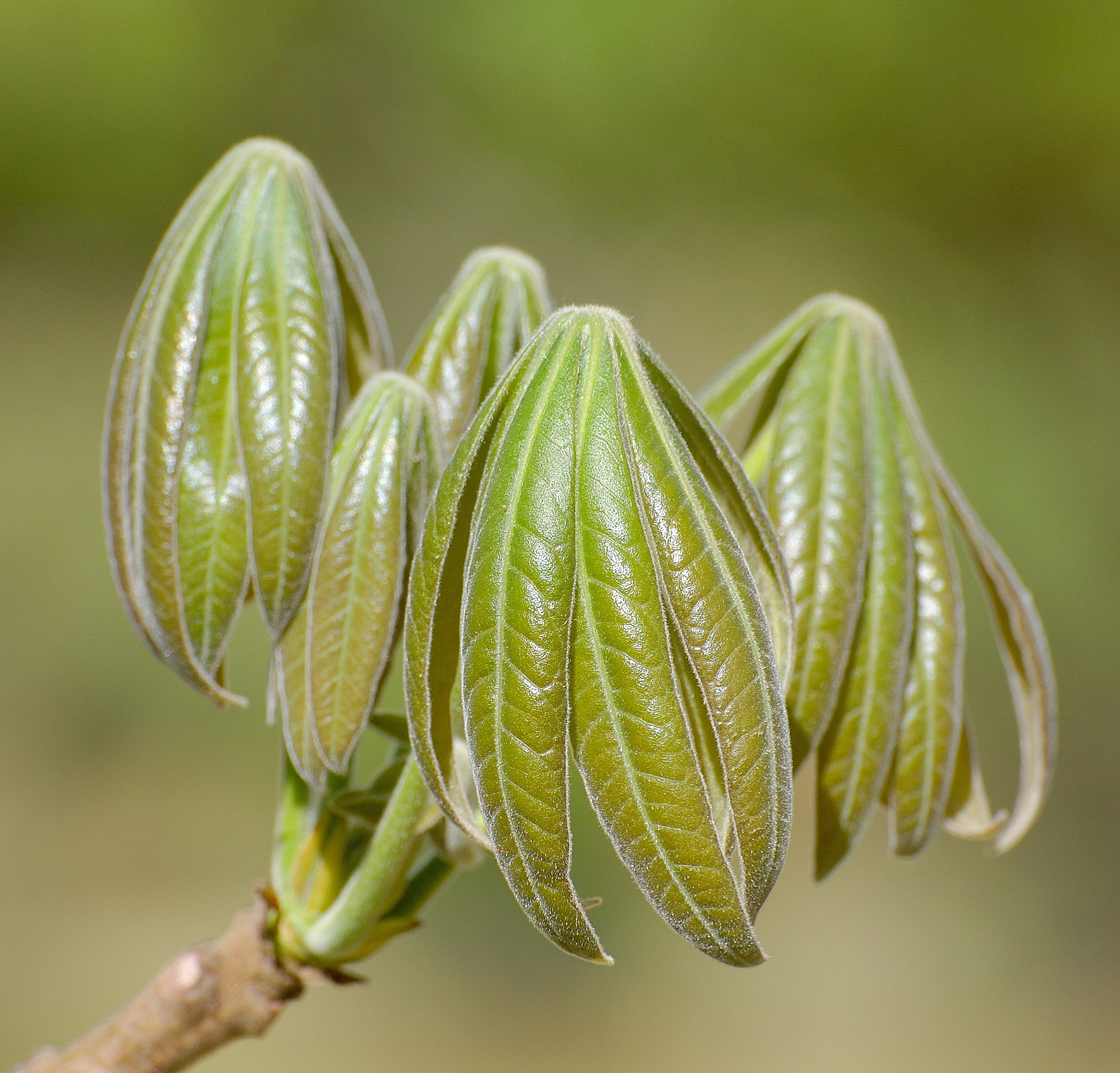
New leaves

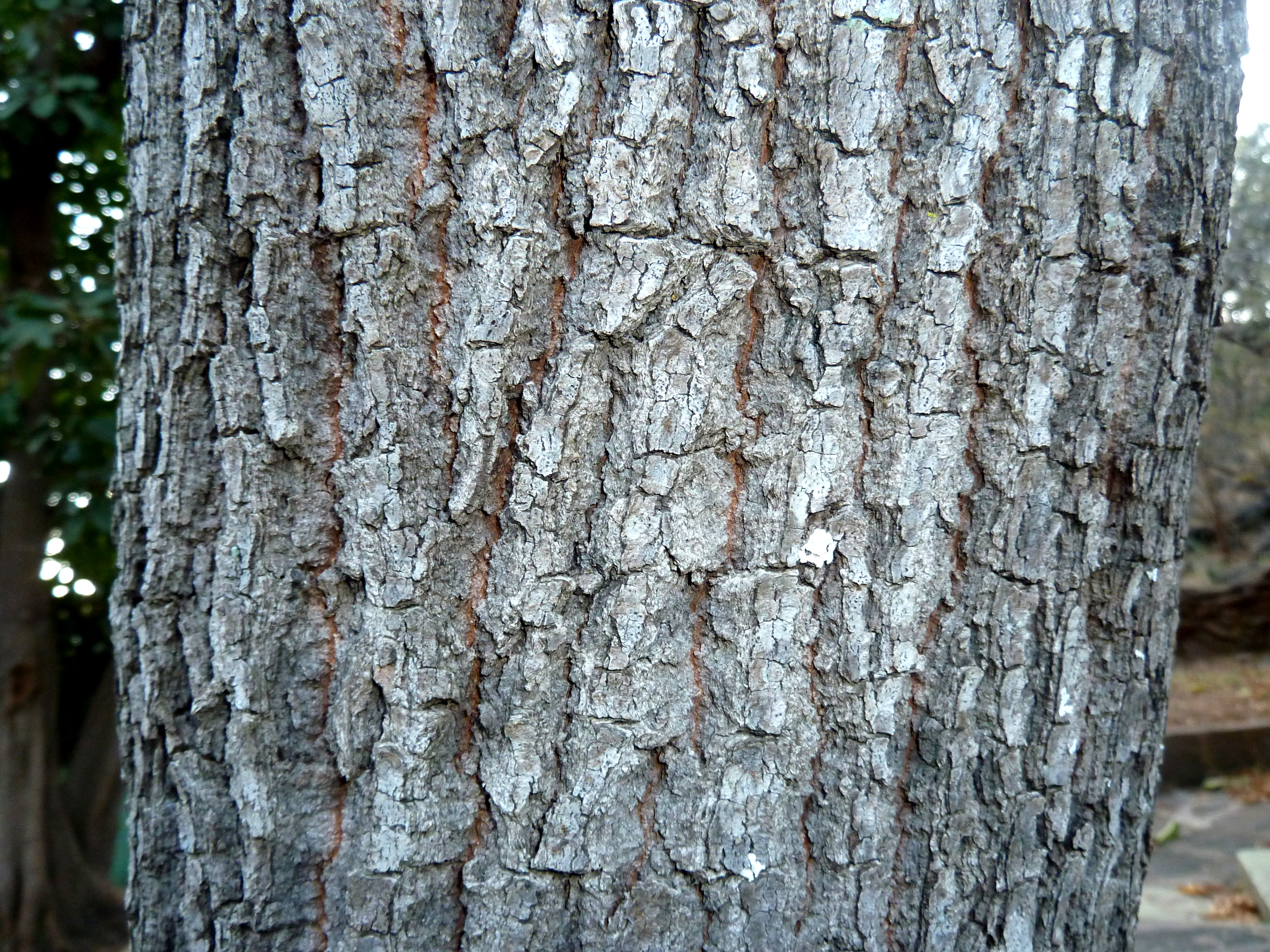
Bark
