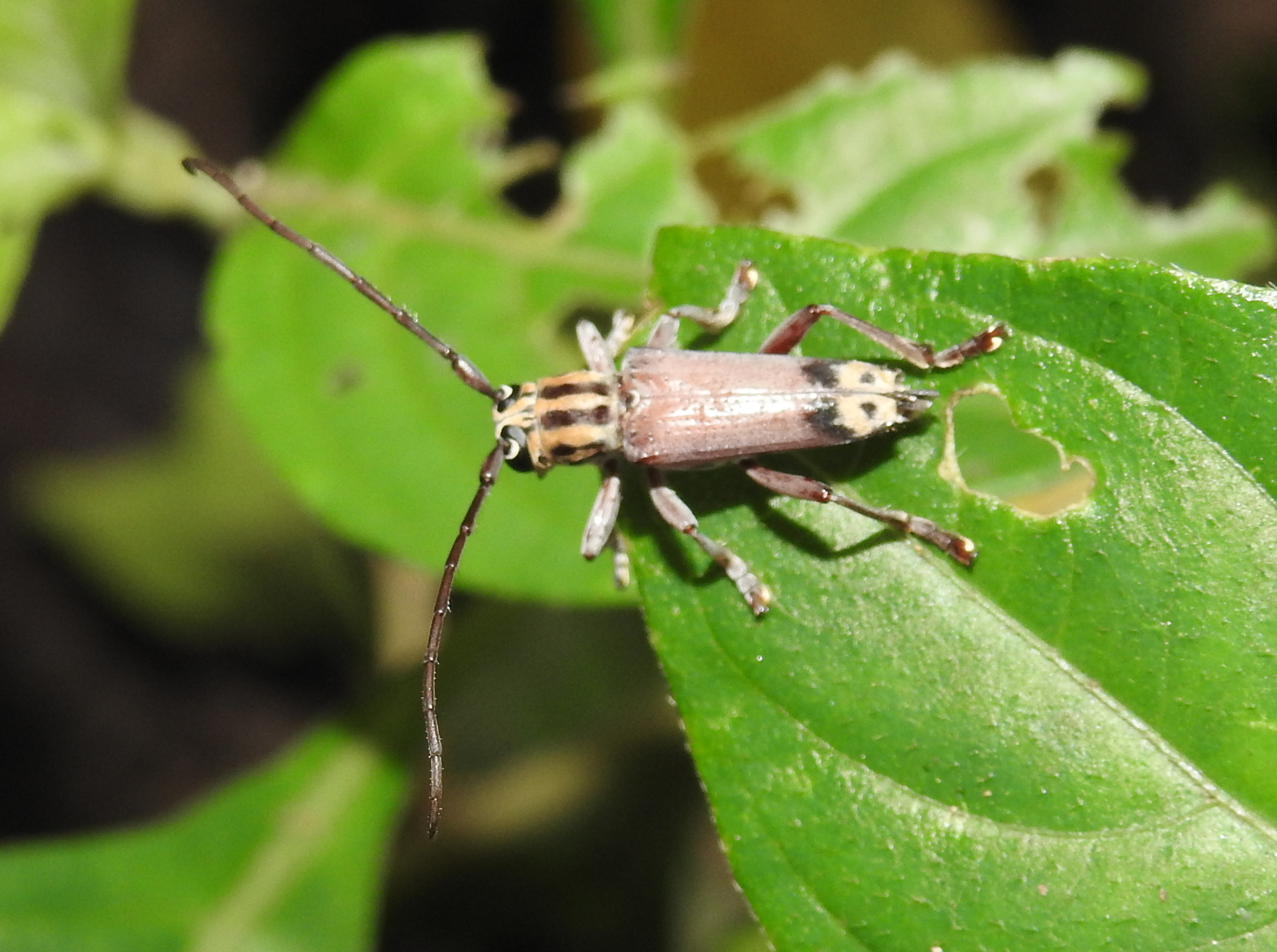

Scientific classification
- Domain: Eukaryota
- Kingdom: Animalia
- Phylum: Arthropoda
- Class: Insecta
- Order: Coleoptera
- Suborder: Polyphaga
- Infraorder: Cucujiformia
- Family: Cerambycidae
- Genus: Glenea
- Species: G. homonospila

Binomial name
- Glenea homonospila Thomson, 1865

= Glenea homonospila =

Species of beetle

Glenea homonospila is a species of beetle in the family Cerambycidae. It was described by James Thomson in 1865. It is known from the Western Ghats of India and also parts of northeast India (the type was collected in Sylhet, Assam).

The larvae are known to bore Bombax malabaricum, Zanthoxylum rhetsa, and Sterculia alata with adults emerging from April to July.
