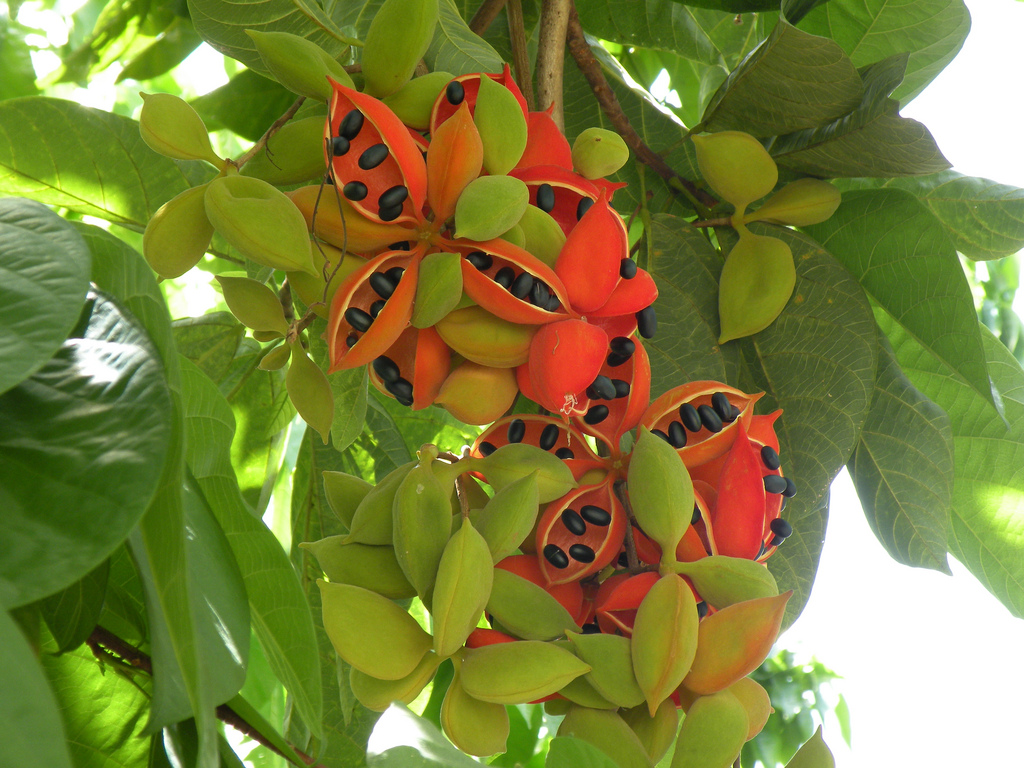
- S. lanceifolia fruit: Koh Lipe, Thailand

Scientific classification
- Kingdom: Plantae
- Clade: Tracheophytes
- Clade: Angiosperms
- Clade: Eudicots
- Clade: Rosids
- Order: Malvales
- Family: Malvaceae
- Genus: Sterculia
- Species: S. lanceifolia

Binomial name
- Sterculia lanceifolia Roxb.

Synonyms
- Sterculia roxburghii Wall. Sterculia roxburghiana Wall. Sterculia ovalifolia Wall. Southwellia roxburghiana Spach; Clompanus roxburghii Kuntze

= Sterculia lanceifolia =

Species of tree

Sterculia lanceifolia is a bush/tree species belonging to the genus Sterculia in the family Malvaceae. This species is found in Bangladesh, NE India, China and Indo-China and there are no subspecies listed in the Catalogue of Life.
