= Sterculia cinerea =

Conservation status
- Near Threatened (IUCN 2.3)

Scientific classification
- Kingdom: Plantae
- Clade: Tracheophytes
- Clade: Angiosperms
- Clade: Eudicots
- Clade: Rosids
- Order: Malvales
- Family: Malvaceae
- Genus: Sterculia
- Species: S. cinerea

Binomial name
- Sterculia cinerea A.Rich.

Species of flowering plant

Sterculia cinerea is a species of plant in the family Malvaceae. It is found in Eritrea, Ethiopia, and Sudan.
