= Sterculia hypochroa =

Scientific classification
- Kingdom: Plantae
- Clade: Tracheophytes
- Clade: Angiosperms
- Clade: Eudicots
- Clade: Rosids
- Order: Malvales
- Family: Malvaceae
- Genus: Sterculia
- Species: S. hypochroa

Binomial name
- Sterculia hypochroa Pierre

Synonyms
- Clompanus hypochra Kuntze

Species of tree

Sterculia hypochroa is a tree species described by Pierre, belonging to the genus Sterculia and the family Malvaceae (previously the Sterculiaceae, now relegated to a subfamily). No subspecies are listed in the Catalogue of Life. These trees are found in Vietnam, where they are known as trôm quạt.
