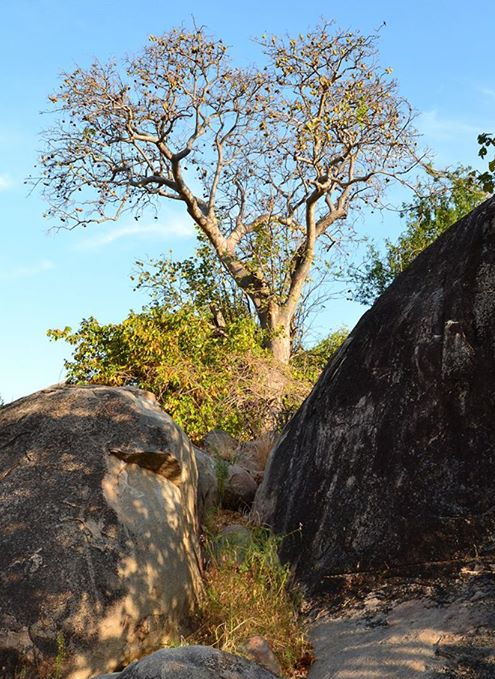
- S. africana taken in Namaso Bay, Southern Lake Malawi.

Conservation status
- Least Concern (IUCN 3.1)

Scientific classification
- Kingdom: Plantae
- Clade: Tracheophytes
- Clade: Angiosperms
- Clade: Eudicots
- Clade: Rosids
- Order: Malvales
- Family: Malvaceae
- Genus: Sterculia
- Species: S. africana

Binomial name
- Sterculia africana (Lour.) Fiori

Synonyms
- Clompanus africana (Lour.) Kuntze; Sterculia triphaca R.Br.; Triphaca africana Lour.; Clompanus arabica (T.Anderson) Kuntze; Sterculia abyssinica R.Br.; Sterculia africana var. socotrana (K.Schum.) Fiori; Sterculia arabica T.Anderson; Sterculia guerichii K.Schum.; Sterculia ipomoeifolia Garcke; Sterculia triphaca var. guerichii K.Schum.; Sterculia triphaca var. socotrana K.Schum.

= Sterculia africana =

Species of tree

Sterculia africana is a species of flowering plant in the family Malvaceae (previously the Sterculiaceae, now relegated to a subfamily). This deciduous tree is sometimes referred to by the common names African star-chestnut and mopopaja tree. It is distributed throughout Northeast Africa to Arabia.

== Description ==
Sterculia africana is a deciduous tree that grows up to 8m tall, it is monoecious, with a single trunk and rounded crown. S.africana has smooth and flaking bark that is grey or pinkish brown. The leaves alternate, crowded at the ends of branches, orbicular, 8–15 cm long x 8–15 cm across. Leaves are 3-5 lobed and covered in stellate hairs. Flowers appear before the leaves 1.5–2 cm across, in axillary panicles. Flowers are unisexual with both sexes being found on the same tree. They have no petals, but the calyx is coloured and functions as a corolla. In the male flowers the numerous anthers are fused together to form a column. The fruits consist of 3-5 spreading, ovoid lobes which split at maturity and are covered with dense golden hairs. The inside surface of the lobes contain small stinging hairs.

Stercula africana sheds its leaves during the dry season and comes into flower before the leaves reappear at the start of the monsoon. Small quantities of resin ooze from the bark of the trunk and larger branches.

== Distribution and habitat ==
Sterculia africana has been recorded in southeastern Egypt, Eastern Sudan, Ethiopia, Djibouti, northern Somalia, southern Tanzania, Mozambique, Malawi, eastern Zambia, Zimbabwe, Botswana, and Namibia's Caprivi Strip. No subspecies are listed in the Catalogue of Life. Variety socotrana is endemic to the island of Socotra.

Sterculia africana grows in dry woodlands on limestone escarpments and the sides of wadis usually at elevations of below 600m.

== Uses ==
Resin was traditionally used as a washing agent in Arabia. The hardened resin was mixed with water or spittle and then rubbed over the body. It was also a treatment to treat head lice. It is an important fodder and the wood was used to make fishing platforms.

== Threats ==
The current population is stable however as it is an important fodder for cattle, if the livestock populations increase, the tree would come under increasing threat.

== Gallery ==
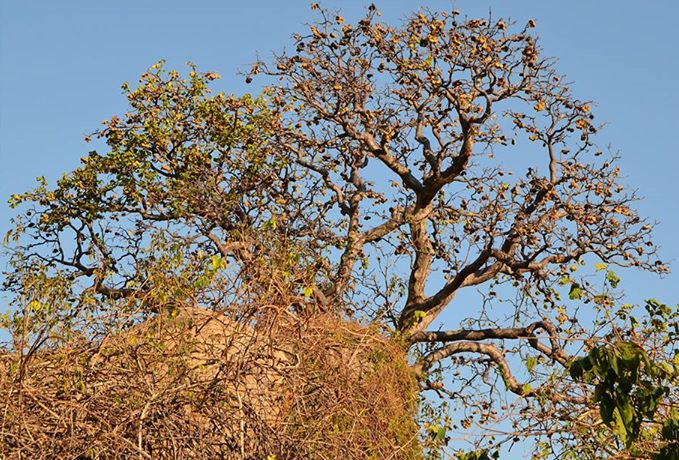

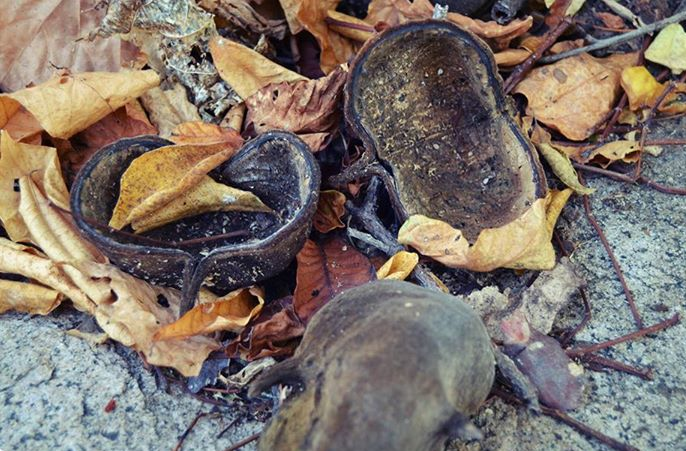

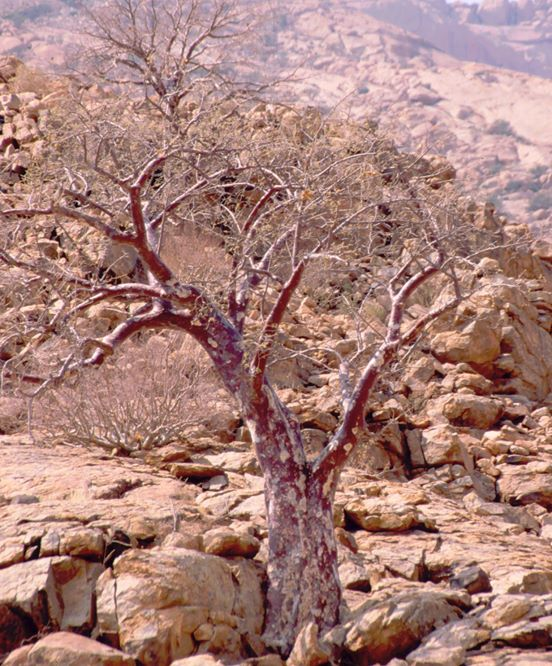

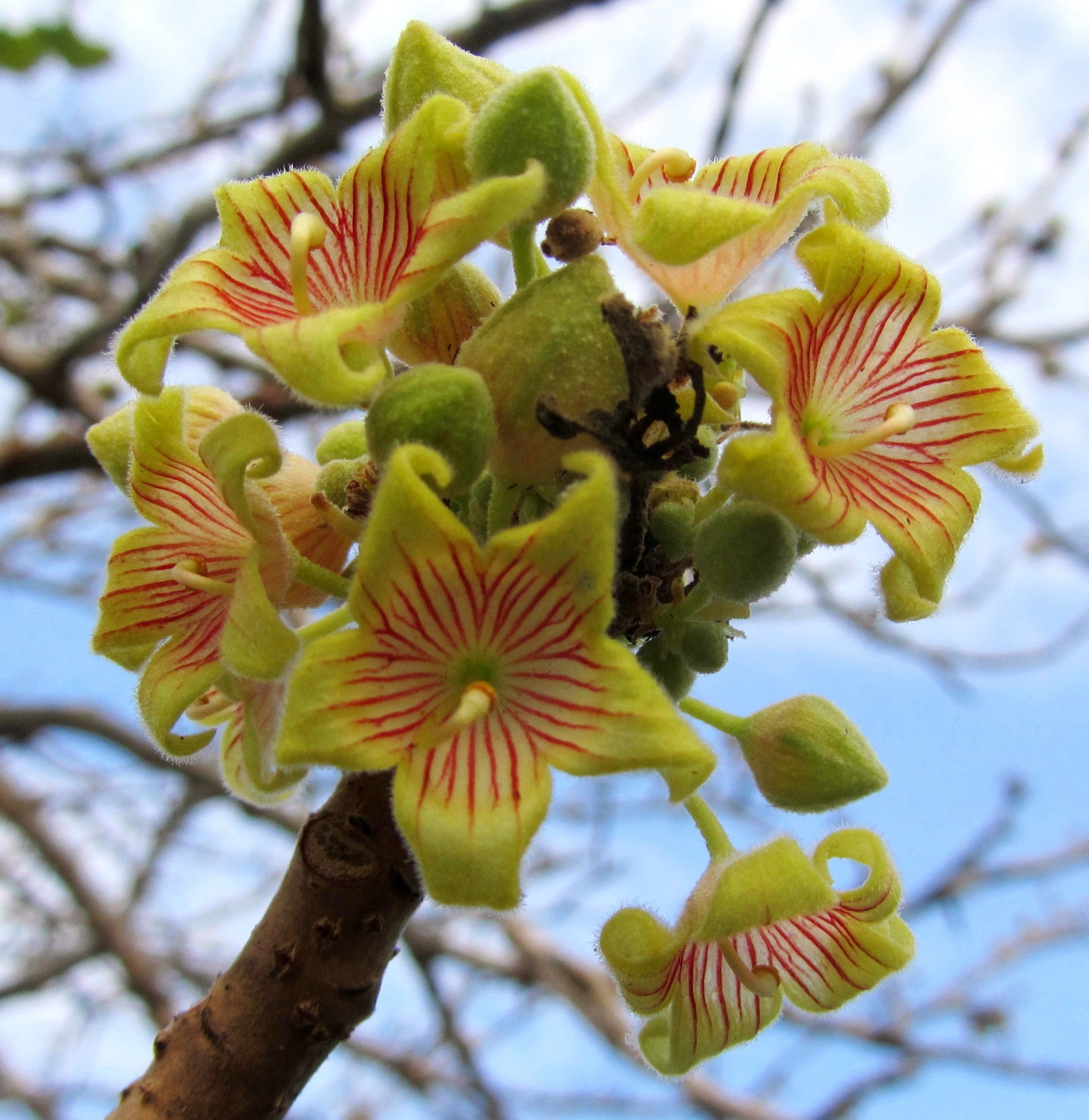
