= Sterculia oblonga =

Conservation status
- Vulnerable (IUCN 2.3)

Scientific classification
- Kingdom: Plantae
- Clade: Tracheophytes
- Clade: Angiosperms
- Clade: Eudicots
- Clade: Rosids
- Order: Malvales
- Family: Malvaceae
- Genus: Sterculia
- Species: S. oblonga

Binomial name
- Sterculia oblonga Mast.

Synonyms
- Homotypic Synonyms: Clompanus oblonga (Mast.) Kuntze; Eribroma oblonga (Mast.) Pierre ex A.Chev.; Heterotypic Synonyms: Sterculia elegantiflora Hutch. & Dalziel; Sterculia thompsonii Hutch. & Dalziel

Species of tree

Sterculia oblonga is a species of tropical rainforest tree in the family Malvaceae. It is commonly known as the yellow sterculia. It is native to West and Central Africa and is exploited commercially for its timber. The species is threatened by habitat loss and over-exploitation.

== Description ==
A medium-sized evergreen rainforest tree (size varies by locality). It produces commercially valuable timber and has the general habit typical of canopy or sub-canopy species in humid tropical forests. Detailed morphological characters (leaf shape, flower structure, fruit type) should be added from a reliable taxonomic source.

== Distribution and habitat ==
Native to tropical rainforests of West and Central Africa, with reported occurrences in Cameroon, Central African Republic, Republic of the Congo, Democratic Republic of the Congo, Gabon, Ghana, Guinea, Gulf of Guinea Islands, Ivory Coast, Liberia, and Nigeria. Occurs in lowland moist forests and gallery forests; elevation range and habitat specifics need citation.

== Uses ==
Harvested for its timber, which is used locally and commercially for construction, furniture and general carpentry. Local names and specific wood properties (density, durability, common trade names) should be sourced from forestry references.

== Conservation ==
Assessed as Vulnerable (IUCN 2.3) due to ongoing habitat loss and exploitation for timber. Populations are believed to be declining where deforestation and selective logging are intense. Conservation actions, protected populations, and any national legal status should be verified against up-to-date IUCN or national assessments.

== Taxonomy ==
Originally described as Sterculia oblonga Mast.; the name Eribroma oblonga has been used in some treatments and is listed as a synonym by several botanical databases.
