= Sterculia schliebenii =

Conservation status
- Vulnerable (IUCN 2.3)

Scientific classification
- Kingdom: Plantae
- Clade: Embryophytes
- Clade: Tracheophytes
- Clade: Angiosperms
- Clade: Eudicots
- Clade: Rosids
- Order: Malvales
- Family: Malvaceae
- Genus: Sterculia
- Species: S. schliebenii

Binomial name
- Sterculia schliebenii Mildbr.

Species of flowering plant

Sterculia schliebenii is a species of flowering plant in the family Malvaceae. It is found in Kenya, Mozambique, and Tanzania.
