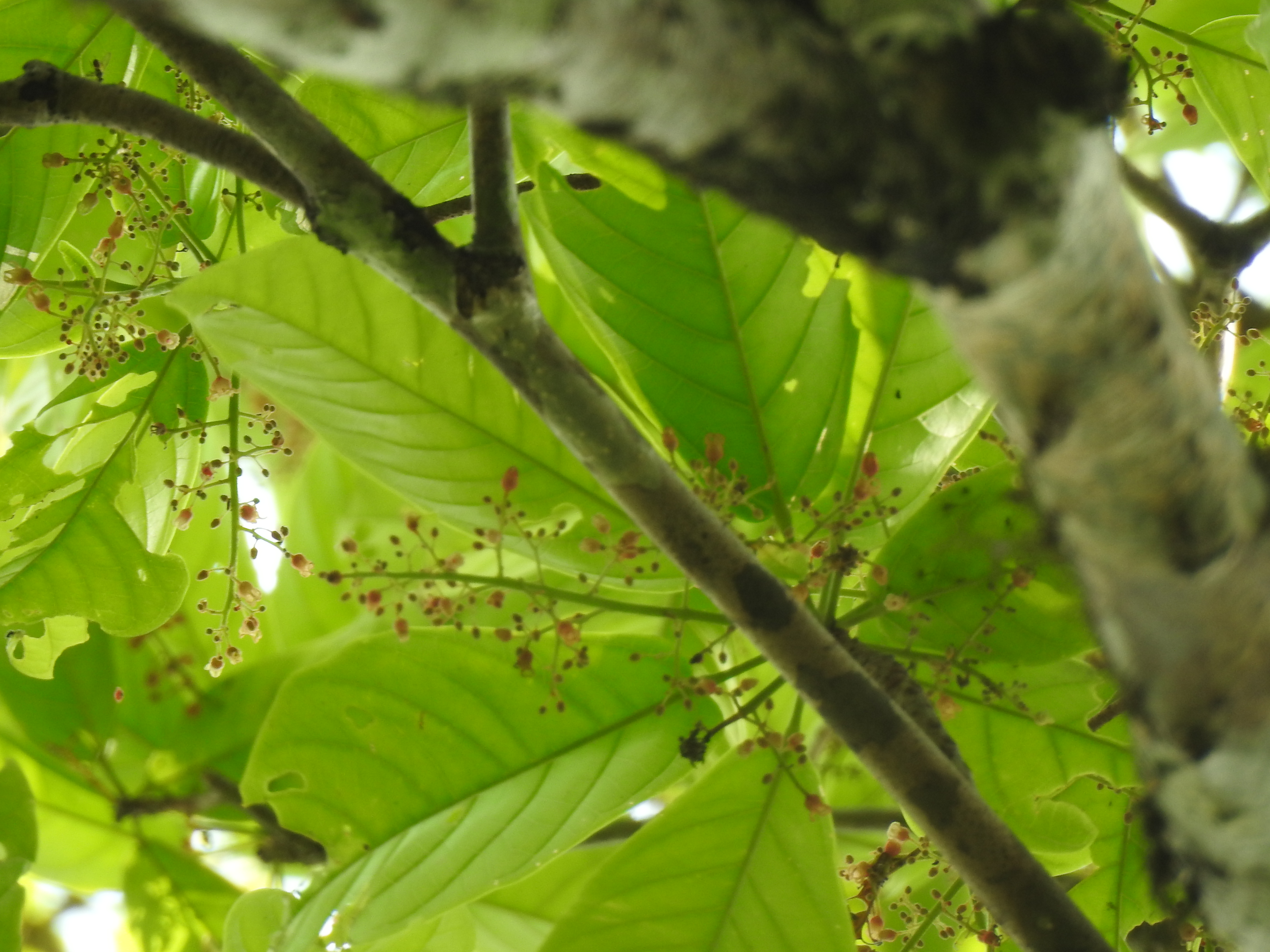
- Sterculia parviflora foliage and minute flowers

Conservation status
- Least Concern (IUCN 2.3)

Scientific classification
- Kingdom: Plantae
- Clade: Tracheophytes
- Clade: Angiosperms
- Clade: Eudicots
- Clade: Rosids
- Order: Malvales
- Family: Malvaceae
- Genus: Sterculia
- Species: S. parviflora

Binomial name
- Sterculia parviflora Roxb.

= Sterculia parviflora =

Species of flowering plant

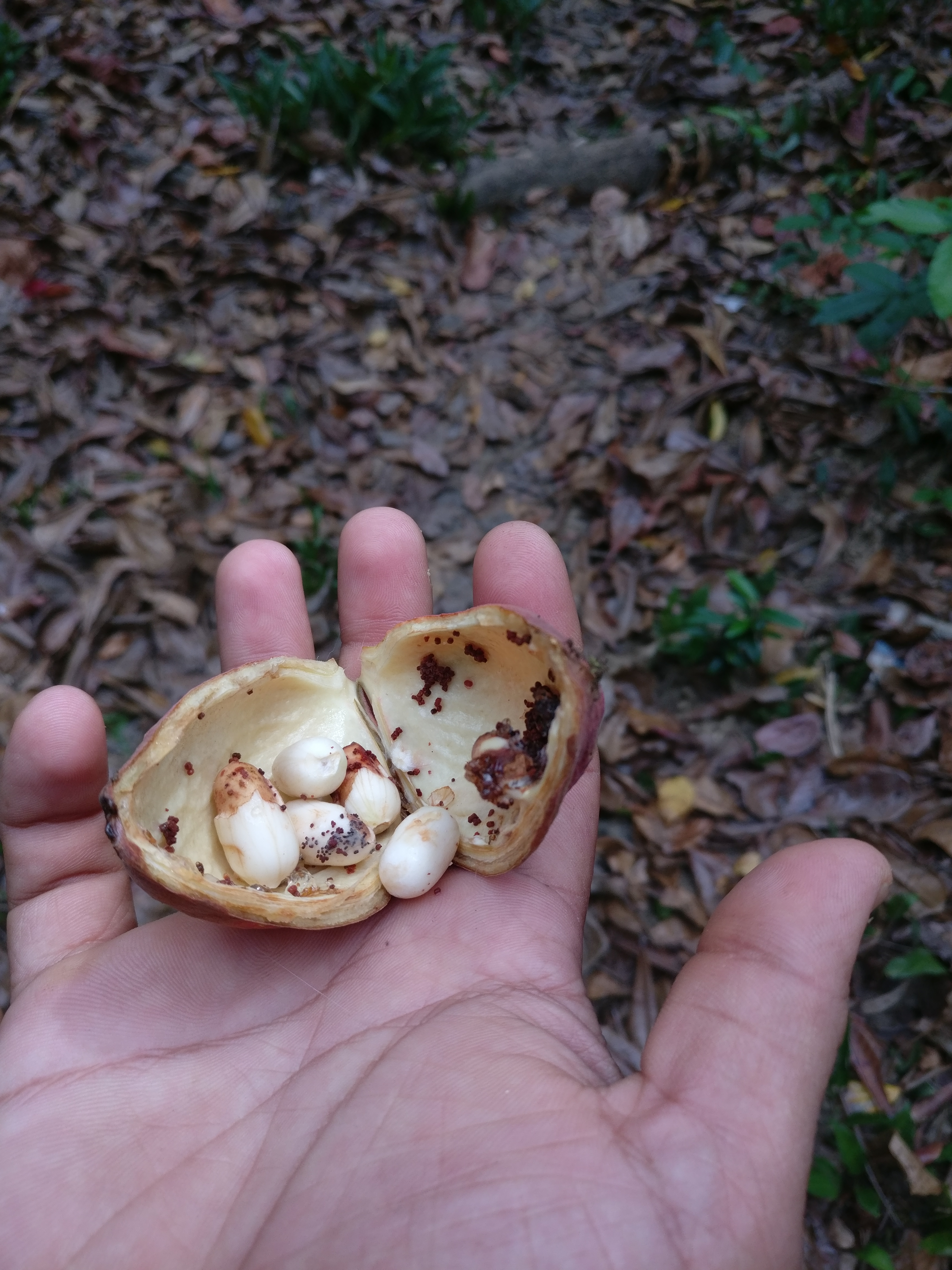
S. parviflora fruit (a follicle) split open exposing the seeds.

Sterculia parviflora is a species of plant in the family Malvaceae. It is found in India, Indonesia, Malaysia, and Singapore.

First described in the Flora Indica by the botanist William Roxburgh, S. parviflora is a tree reaching up to 35 metres (115 ft) tall.
