= Sterculia khasiana =

Conservation status
- Extinct (IUCN 2.3)

Scientific classification
- Kingdom: Plantae
- Clade: Tracheophytes
- Clade: Angiosperms
- Clade: Eudicots
- Clade: Rosids
- Order: Malvales
- Family: Malvaceae
- Genus: Sterculia
- Species: †S. khasiana

Binomial name
- †Sterculia khasiana Deb.

Extinct species of tree

Sterculia khasiana was a species of plant in the family Malvaceae. It was an endemic tree of the Khasi Hills in Meghalaya in India. It became extinct due to habitat loss.
