= Sterculia stigmarota =

Scientific classification
- Kingdom: Plantae
- Clade: Tracheophytes
- Clade: Angiosperms
- Clade: Eudicots
- Clade: Rosids
- Order: Malvales
- Family: Malvaceae
- Genus: Sterculia
- Species: S. stigmarota

Binomial name
- Sterculia stigmarota Pierre

Synonyms
- Clompanus stigmarota (Pierre) Kuntze

Species of flowering plant

Sterculia stigmarota is a plant, belonging to the genus Sterculia and the family Malvaceae (previously the Sterculiaceae, now relegated to a subfamily). This species is found only in southern Vietnam (where it is known as bảy thưa muốm quay) and there are no subspecies listed in the Catalogue of Life.
