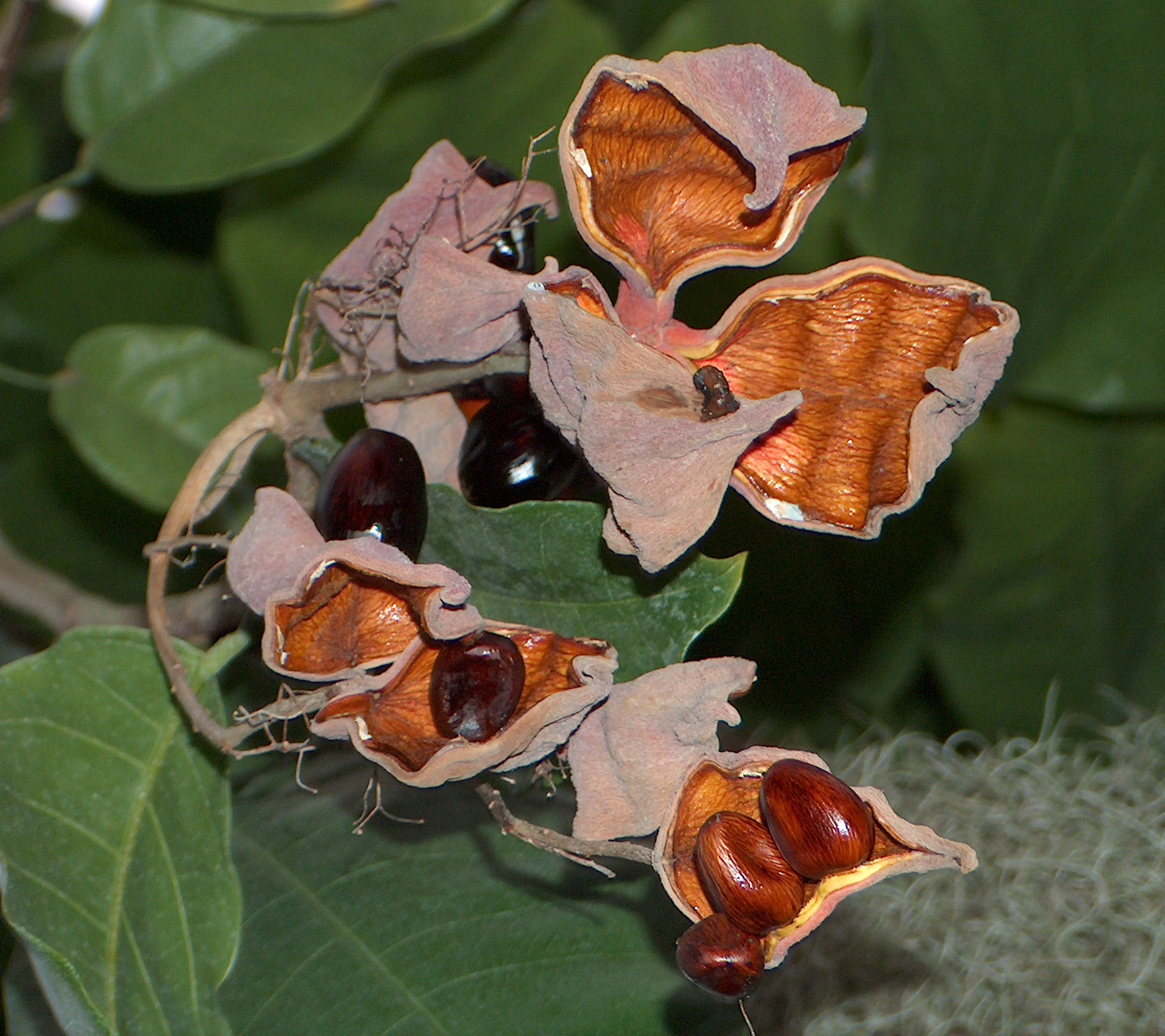

Scientific classification
- Kingdom: Plantae
- Clade: Tracheophytes
- Clade: Angiosperms
- Clade: Eudicots
- Clade: Rosids
- Order: Malvales
- Family: Malvaceae
- Genus: Sterculia
- Species: S. balanghas

Binomial name
- Sterculia balanghas L.

Synonyms
- Balanghas telabo Raf.; Southwellia angustifolia Wight; Southwellia balanghas Spach

= Sterculia balanghas =

Species of flowering plant

Sterculia balanghas is a species of plant in the family Malvaceae. It is native to India and Sri Lanka. Leaves are simple, alternate; swollen at base and tipped; lamina elliptic, obovate, oblong, elliptic-ovate or oblong-ovate; base subcordate or round; apex acuminate; with entire margin. Flowers may be unisexual or polygamous are yellow or greenish-purple in color. Inflorescence show terminal or axillary panicles. Orange to red colored fruit is oblong and seeds are black in color.

The plant is known as "nawa - නාවා" by Sinhalese people in Sri Lanka. It is widely used as an ornamental tree and as a fence tree in Sri Lanka.
