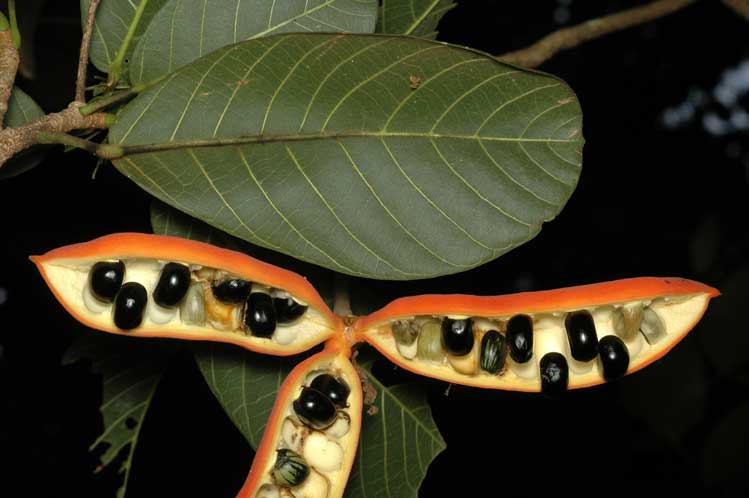
- Ripe fruit split open to release seeds

Conservation status
- Least Concern (NCA)
- Least Concern (IUCN 3.1)

Scientific classification
- Kingdom: Plantae
- Clade: Tracheophytes
- Clade: Angiosperms
- Clade: Eudicots
- Clade: Rosids
- Order: Malvales
- Family: Malvaceae
- Genus: Sterculia
- Species: S. shillinglawii

Binomial name
- Sterculia shillinglawii F.Muell.

= Sterculia shillinglawii =

Lacewood

Species of flowering plant

Sterculia shillinglawii, commonly known as tulip sterculia or lacewood, is a tree in the cotton and cocoa family Malvaceae, native to Papuasia and northeastern Australia.

== Description ==
Sterculia shillinglawii is a rainforest tree growing up to 30 m (98 ft) high with a trunk diameter of up to 1.2 m (3 ft 11 in) — the trunk is straight and may or may not have buttresses. The simple leaves are a dull mid green above, lighter green or brown with a dense covering of fine hairs below. They have entire margins (i.e. without teeth or lobes) and about 10 lateral veins either side of the midrib. They measure about 15 cm (5.9 in) long by 8.5 cm (3.3 in) wide and are carried on a long petiole about 3 cm (1.2 in) long.

The inflorescence is a panicle produced in the leaf axils or on the twigs below the leaves, and may be up to 20 cm (7.9 in) long. The individual flowers are without petals but have five sepals, and are about 10 mm (0.39 in) wide and long. They are white, cream, or pale yellow in colour.

The fruit is a yellow, orange, or (most commonly) bright red follicle up to 9 cm (3.5 in) long by 2 cm (0.79 in) wide which is covered in a fine, dense indumentum. At maturity it splits along the length to reveal the pale coloured interior containing up to eight dark green to black seeds measuring up to 16 mm (0.63 in) long and 10 mm (0.39 in) wide.

== Taxonomy ==
This species was first described in 1887 by the German-born Australian botanist Ferdinand von Mueller, based on material collected by Richard Parkinson in New Britain. Mueller's paper, titled "Two species of Sterculia, discovered by R. Parkinson, Esq., in New Britain" was initially published in The Australasian Journal of Pharmacy and later published again in the German language journal Botanisches Centralblatt.

=== Infraspecies ===
Two subspecies are recognised – the autonym Sterculia shillinglawii subsp. shillinglawii found throughout the species' full range, and Sterculia shillinglawii subsp. malacophylla (K.Schum.) Tantra which is restricted to the Maluku Islands, New Guinea, and the Bismarck Archipelago.

=== Etymology ===
Mueller named this species after Harry Shillinglaw, the editor of The Australasian Journal of Pharmacy. He notes in his paper "I have dedicated this evidently rare tree to Harry Shillinglaw, Esq., the zealous Editor of this periodical, and the accomplished Secretary of the Victorian Board of Pharmacy".

== Distribution and habitat ==
The tulip sterculia is native to Cape York Peninsula in Australia, New Guinea (including the Bismarck Archipelago), the most western part of the Solomon Islands, and Maluku. It grows in rainforest, monsoon forest and gallery forest, at altitudes from sea level to 300 m (980 ft).

== Uses ==
The tulip sterculia is harvested for timber in Papua New Guinea, and has been recommended as a street tree in New South Wales. In the city of Cairns, Queensland, it has been planted in streets and parks.

== Gallery ==
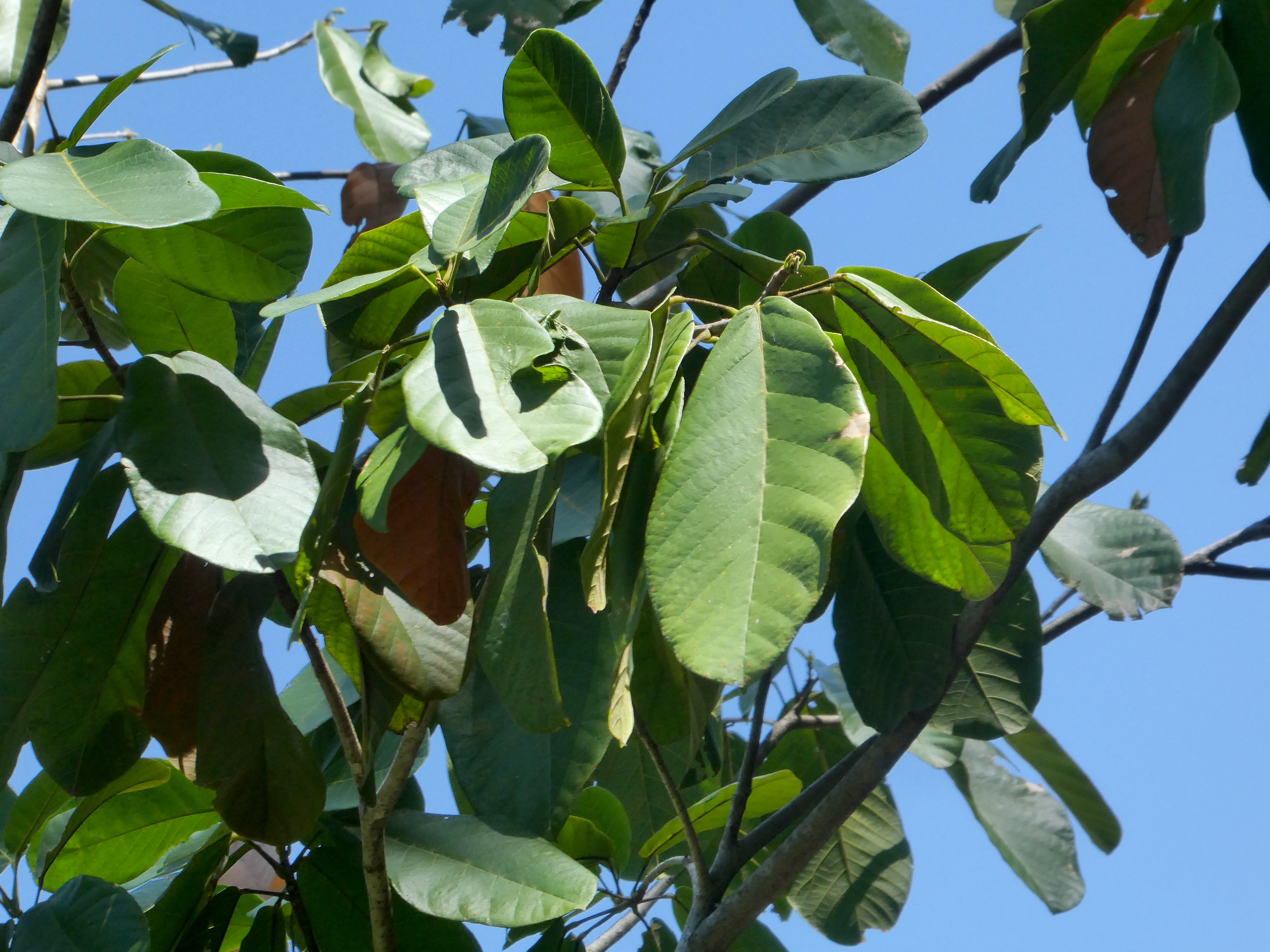
Foliage

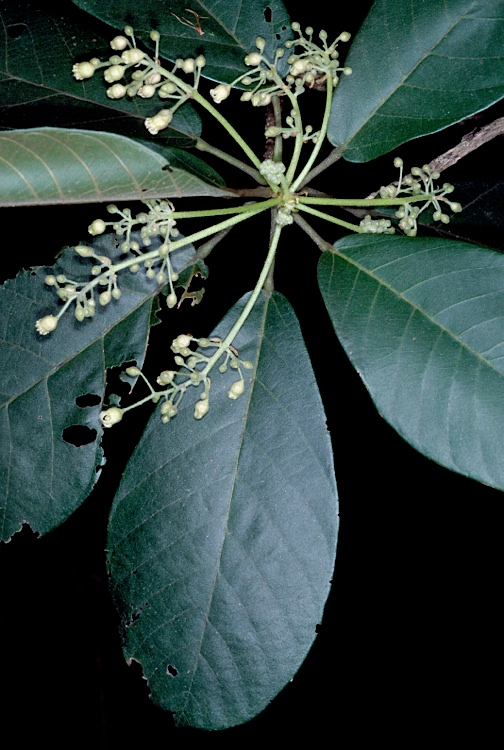
Inflorescence

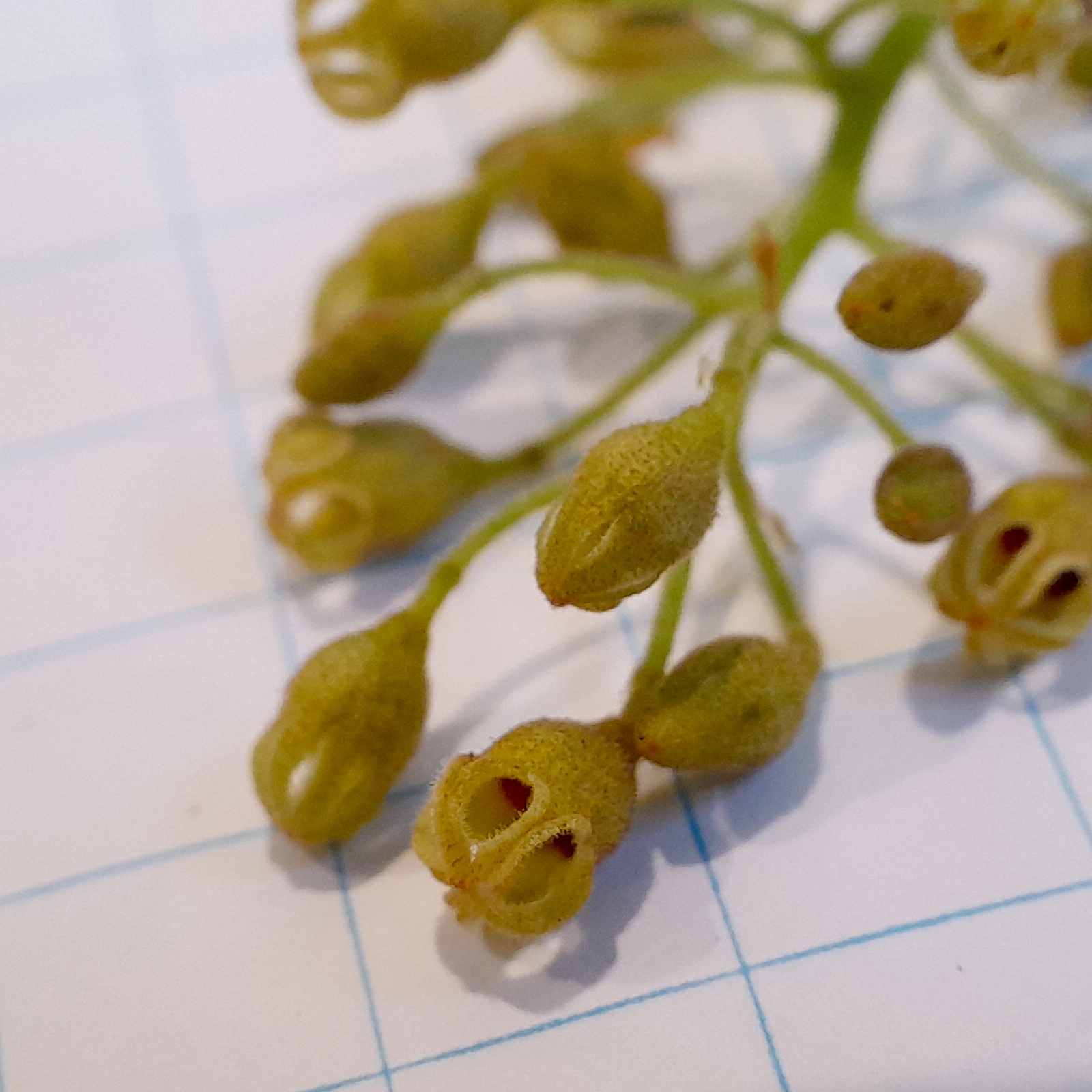
Flowers, detail
(on 1 cm grid)

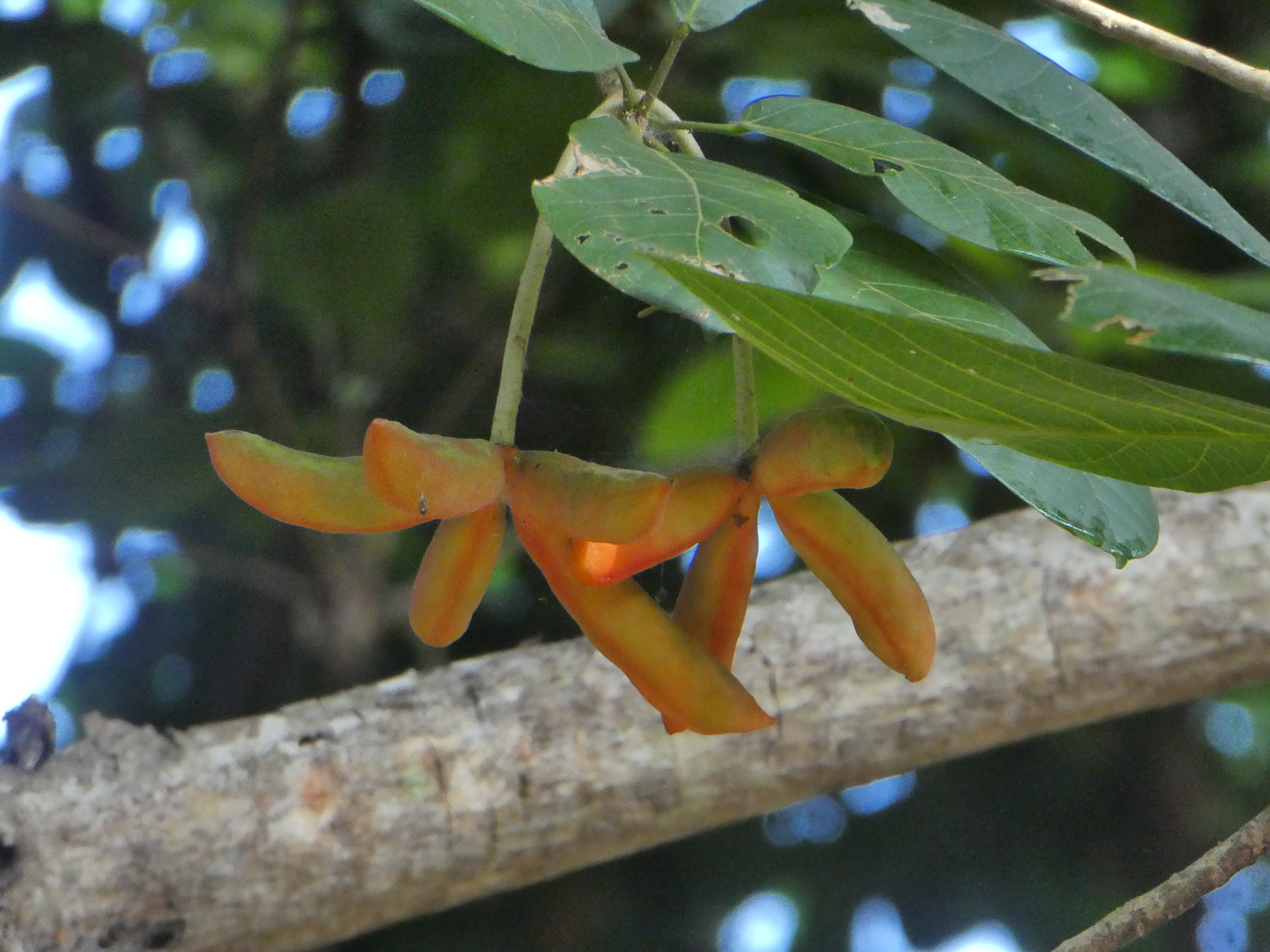
Two clusters of immature fruit

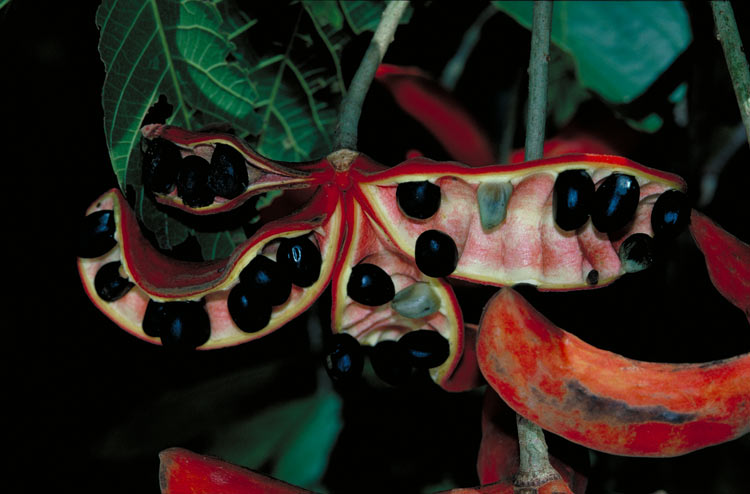
Dehisced fruit, showing seeds within
