= Sterculia rubiginosa =

Scientific classification
- Kingdom: Plantae
- Clade: Embryophytes
- Clade: Tracheophytes
- Clade: Spermatophytes
- Clade: Angiosperms
- Clade: Eudicots
- Clade: Rosids
- Order: Malvales
- Family: Malvaceae
- Genus: Sterculia
- Species: S. rubiginosa

Binomial name
- Sterculia rubiginosa Vent.

Synonyms
- Sterculia translucens Stapf; Sterculia stipularis R. Br. Sterculia rufa Korth. Sterculia rostrata Ridl. Sterculia obovata Merr. Sterculia jackiana Wall. Sterculia humilis Elmer; Sterculia ferruginea R. Br. Sterculia elliptica Airy Shaw; Sterculia cuneata R. Br. Sterculia clemensiae Ridley; Sterculia brevipetiolata Merr. Sterculia brachycarpa Ridl. Sterculia angustifolia Jack; Clompanus stipularis (R. Br.) Kuntze; Clompanus rufa (Korth.) Kuntze; Clompanus rubiginosa (Vent.) Kuntze; Clompanus ferruginea (R. Br.) Kuntze; Clompanus cuneata (R. Br.) Kuntze; Balanghas rubiginosa (Vent.) Rafin.

Species of flowering plant

Sterculia rubiginosa is a plant species, belonging to the genus Sterculia and the family Malvaceae (previously the Sterculiaceae, now relegated to a subfamily). The species can be found in the Andaman and Nicobar islands, Myanmar (Burma), southern Thailand, Malesia (Java, peninsular Malaysia, Sumatra, Singapore, Borneo, Sulawesi), the Philippines and Vietnam (where it is known as bảy rừa lông [sét]).

== Subspecies ==
Three subspecies are listed in the Catalogue of Life:

- S. r. divaricata
- S. r. glabrescens
- S. r. setistipula
