= Sterculia cochinchinensis =

Scientific classification
- Kingdom: Plantae
- Clade: Tracheophytes
- Clade: Angiosperms
- Clade: Eudicots
- Clade: Rosids
- Order: Malvales
- Family: Malvaceae
- Genus: Sterculia
- Species: S. cochinchinensis

Binomial name
- Sterculia cochinchinensis Pierre, 1889

Synonyms
- Clompanus cochinchinensis (Pierre) Kuntze

Species of tree

Sterculia cochinchinensis is a tree species belonging to the genus Sterculia in the family Malvaceae. The name is unresolved according to The Plant List. This species is found in Laos and Vietnam (where it is known as trôm nam [sảng]) and there are no subspecies listed in the Catalogue of Life.
