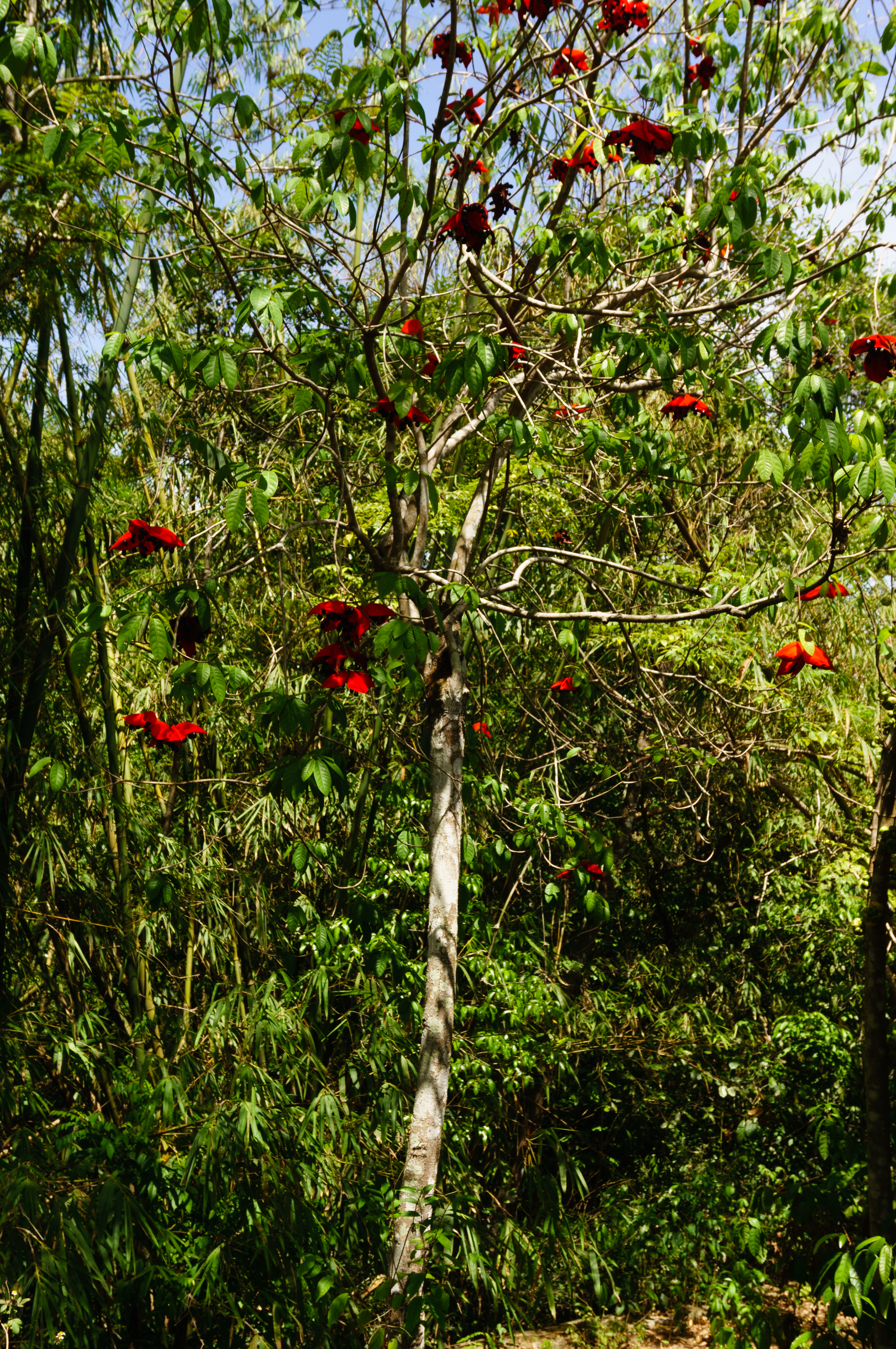

Conservation status
- Least Concern (IUCN 3.1)

Scientific classification
- Kingdom: Plantae
- Clade: Tracheophytes
- Clade: Angiosperms
- Clade: Eudicots
- Clade: Rosids
- Order: Malvales
- Family: Malvaceae
- Genus: Sterculia
- Species: S. lanceolata

Binomial name
- Sterculia lanceolata Cav.

Synonyms
- Sterculia tonkinensis Aug. DC. Sterculia balansae A. DC. Helicteres undulata Lour. Camaion undulata Rafin.

= Sterculia lanceolata =

Species of tree

Sterculia lanceolata is a tree species, belonging to the genus Sterculia and the family Malvaceae (previously the Sterculiaceae, now relegated to a subfamily). The species can be found in southern China (including Hainan island) and Vietnam (where it is variously known as: trôm mề gà, sang sé, sảng, trôm lá mác, trôm thon, che van, chóc móc or tròm thon). The flowers contain five free carpels, or follicles, each of which splits open shortly after pollination so that the seeds grow while fully exposed to the elements. Each scarlet or orange follicle has up to six oblong black seeds.

== Subspecies ==
Two subspecies are listed in the Catalogue of Life:

- S. l. coccinea
- S. l. principis

== Gallery ==
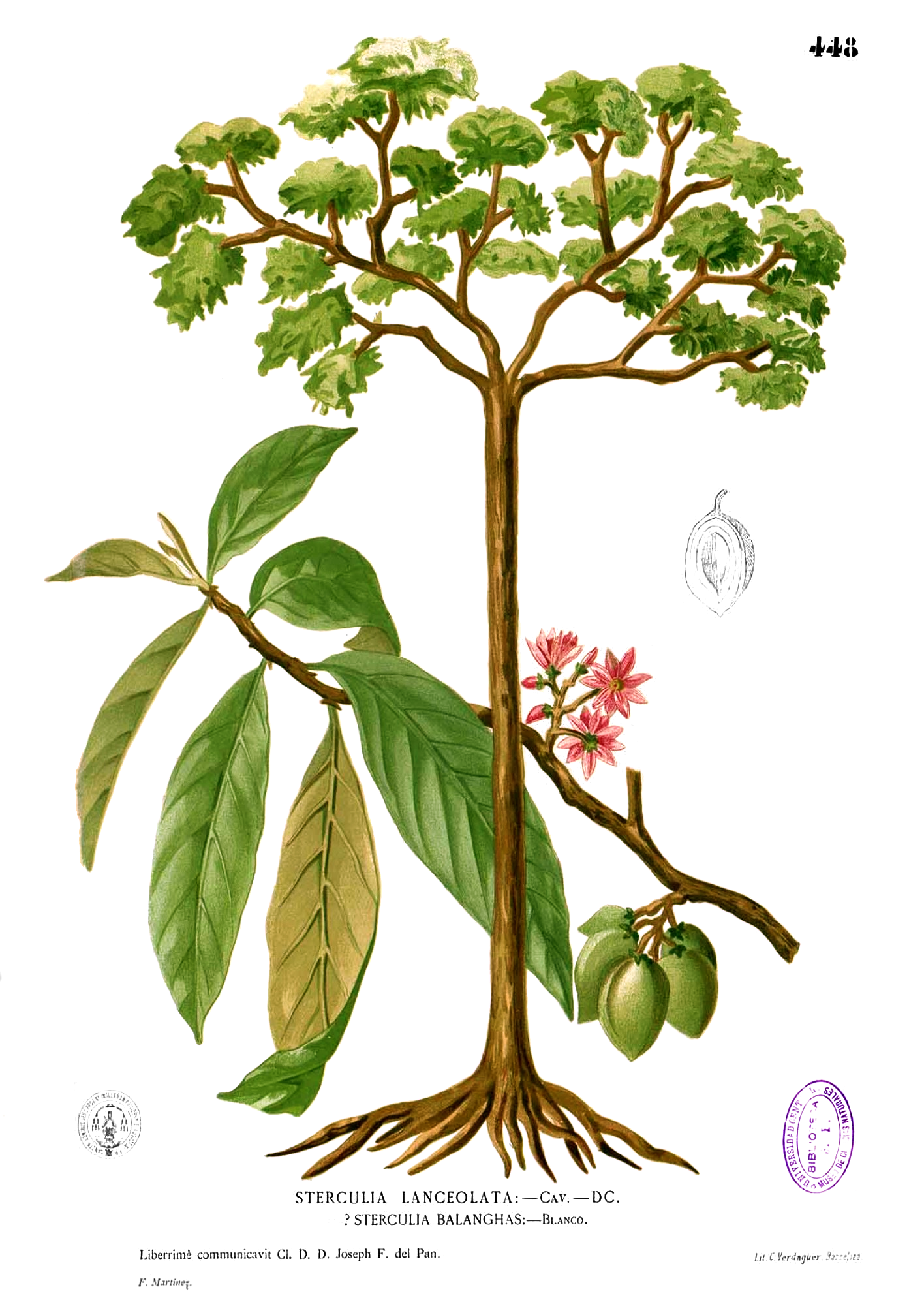

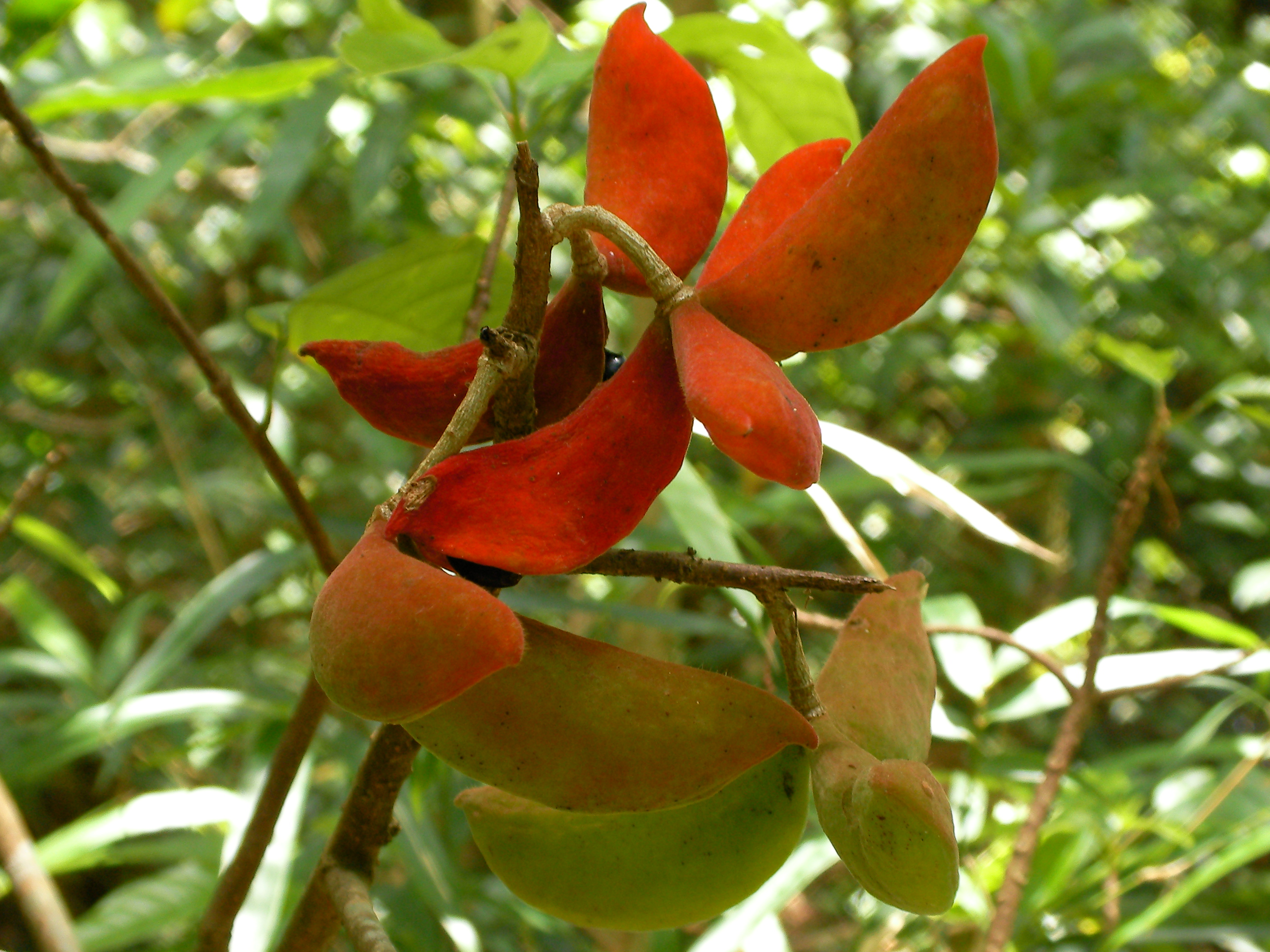

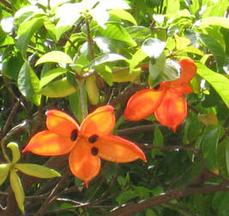

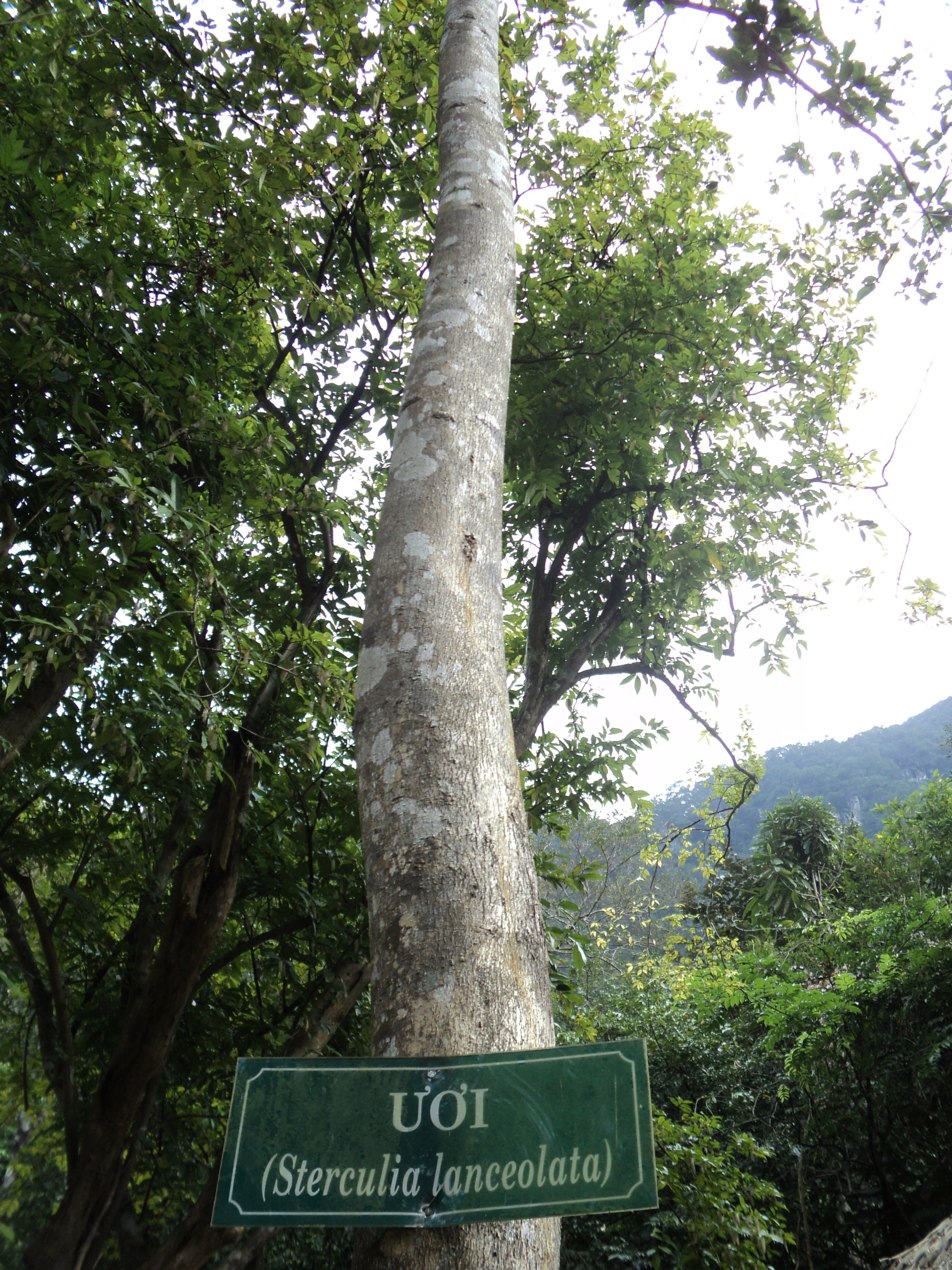
