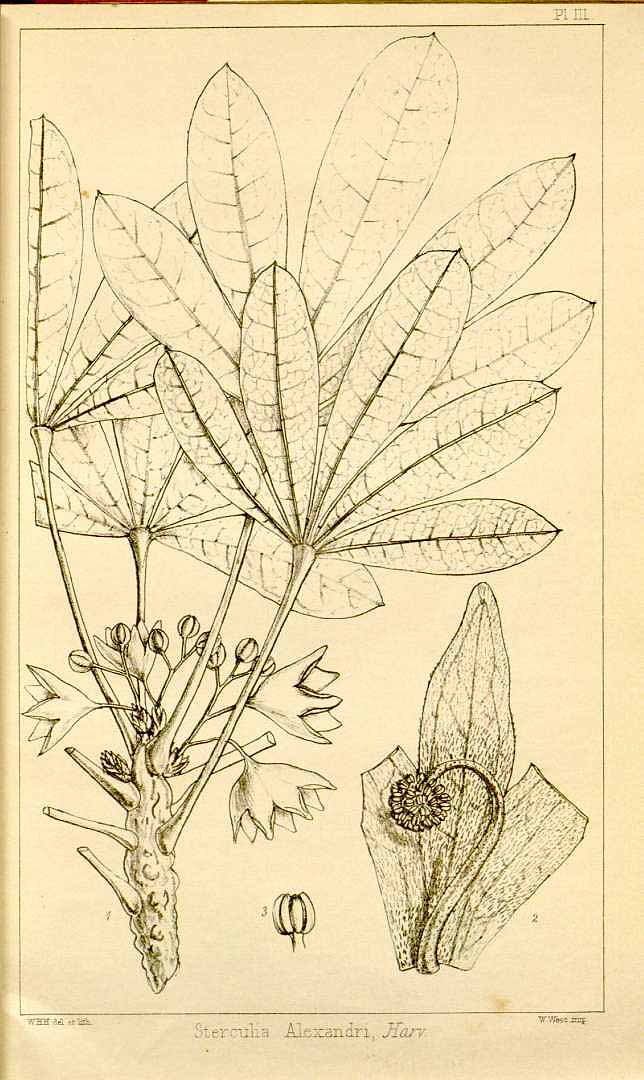

Conservation status
- Least Concern (IUCN 3.1)

Scientific classification
- Kingdom: Plantae
- Clade: Tracheophytes
- Clade: Angiosperms
- Clade: Eudicots
- Clade: Rosids
- Order: Malvales
- Family: Malvaceae
- Genus: Sterculia
- Species: S. alexandri

Binomial name
- Sterculia alexandri Harv.

Synonyms
- Clompanus alexandri (Harv.) Kuntze

= Sterculia alexandri =

Species of flowering plant

Sterculia alexandri is a species of flowering plant in the family Malvaceae. It is endemic to South Africa, occurring in the Eastern Cape, and only found in a few localities: the Winterhoek Mountains near Uitenhage, Van Staaden's Mountains near Port Elizabeth and the Kouga Dam at the start of the Baviaanskloof. It is threatened by habitat loss.

This is a small tree growing on forest margins, stream banks, in scrub, and the slopes of valleys and ravines.
