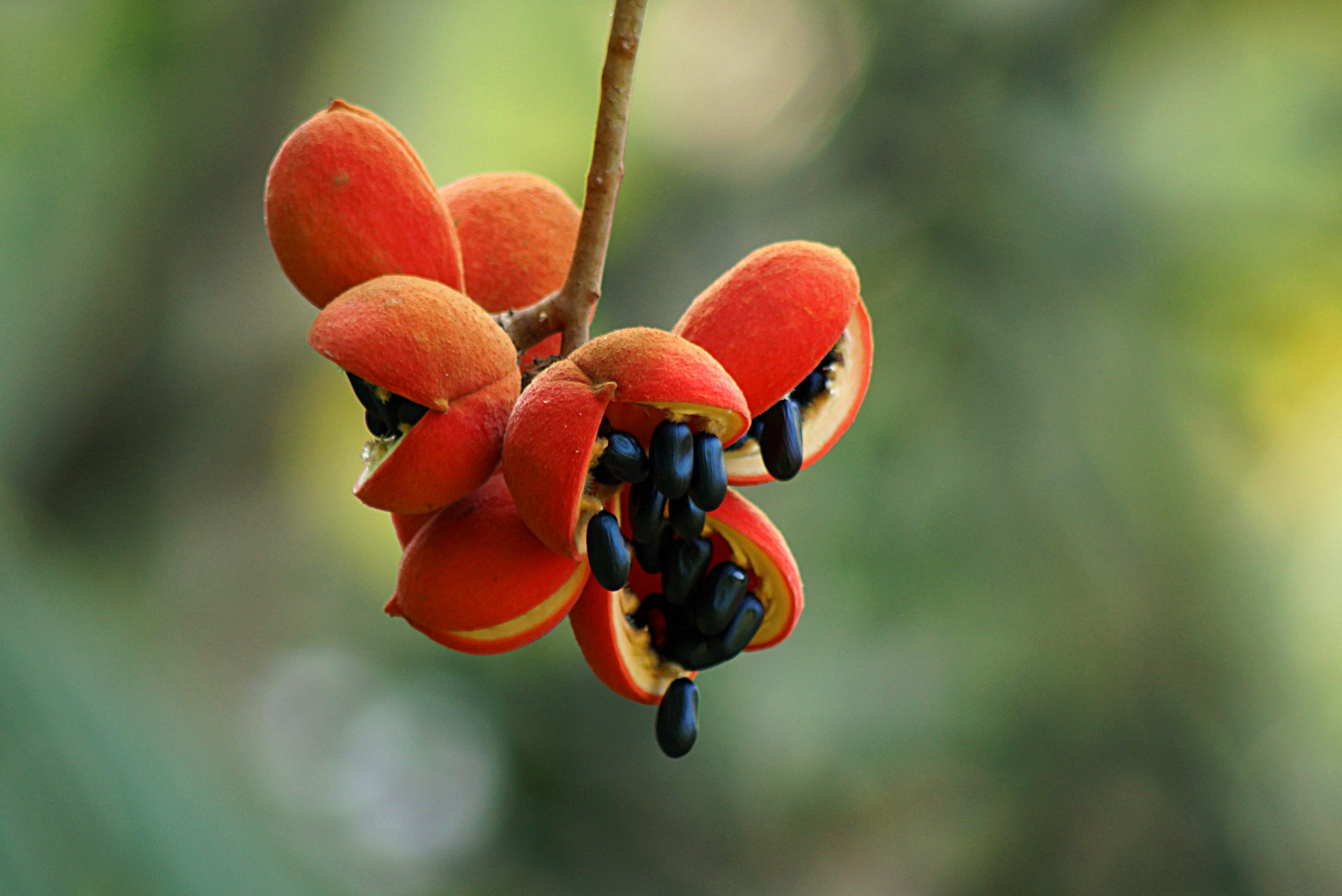
- Sterculia guttata fruit
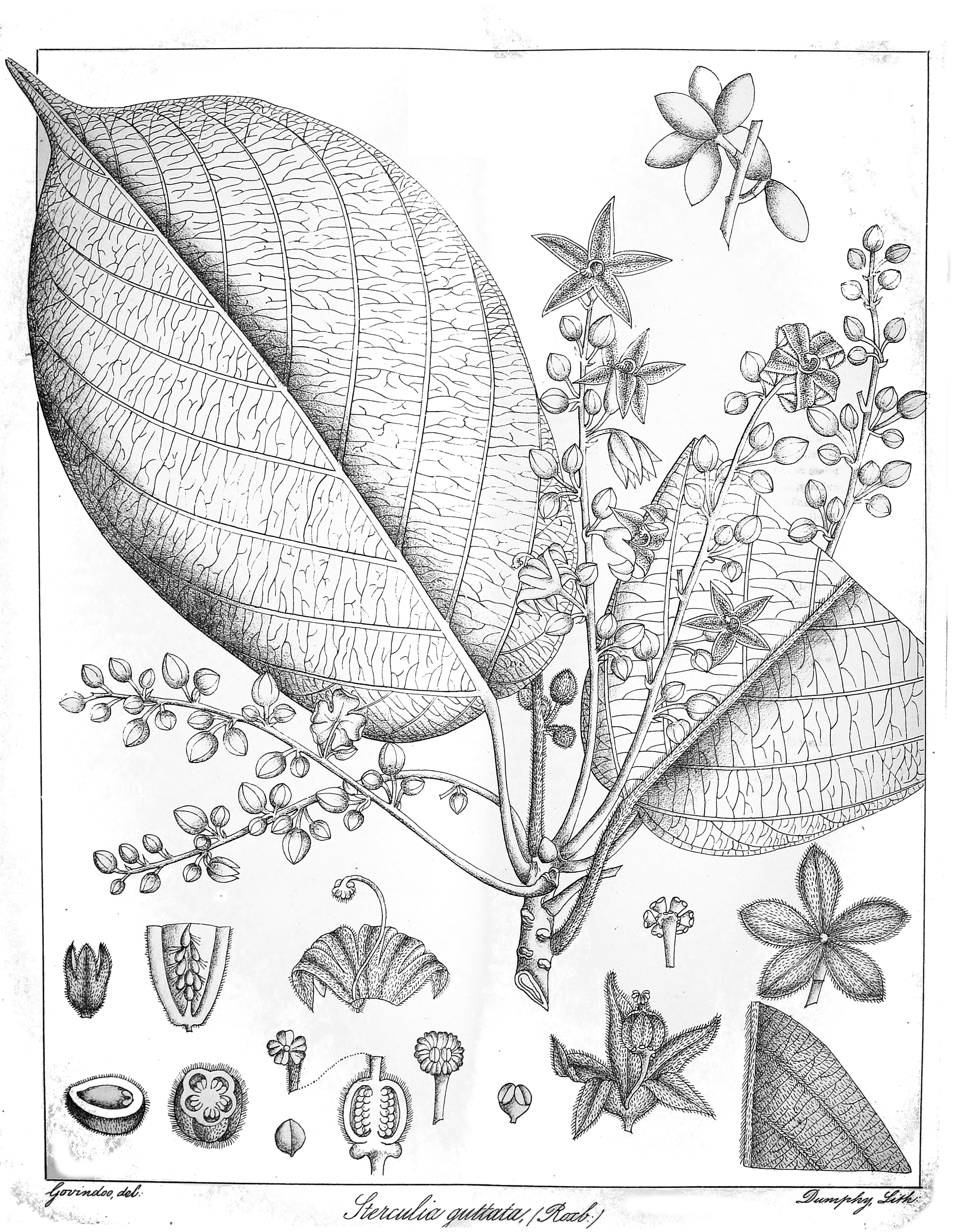
- Botanical illustration

Scientific classification
- Kingdom: Plantae
- Clade: Embryophytes
- Clade: Tracheophytes
- Clade: Spermatophytes
- Clade: Angiosperms
- Clade: Eudicots
- Clade: Rosids
- Order: Malvales
- Family: Malvaceae
- Genus: Sterculia
- Species: S. guttata

Binomial name
- Sterculia guttata Roxb. (1814)

Synonyms
- Astrodendrum malabaricum Dennst. (1818); Clompanus malabarica (Dennst.) Kuntze (1891); Sterculia alata Wall. (1829), not validly publ.; Sterculia cuneata B.Heyne ex Wall. (1829), not validly publ.

= Sterculia guttata =

Species of flowering plant

Sterculia guttata, the spotted sterculia, is a species of plant in the family Malvaceae. It is native to India, Bangladesh, the Andaman and Nicobar Islands, Myanmar, Thailand, and Laos. Extracts from its seeds have been tested for use as an insecticide against mosquito larvae.

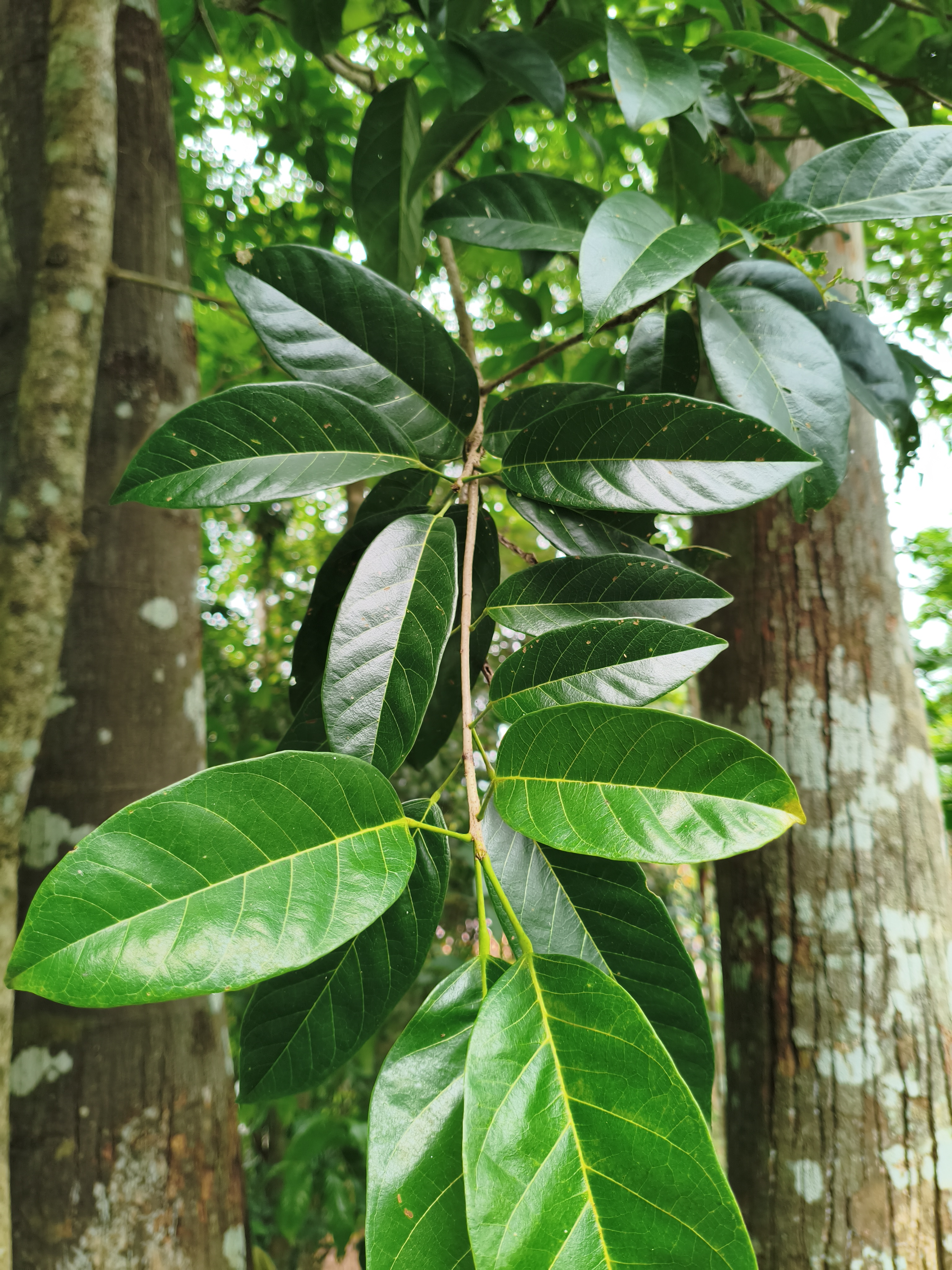
Leaves of Sterculia guttata
