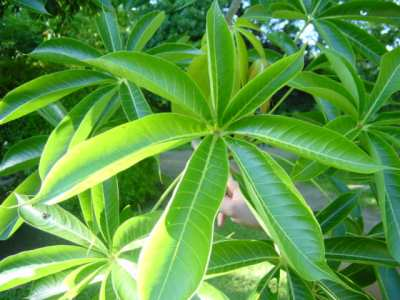
- S. foetida

Scientific classification
- Kingdom: Plantae
- Clade: Embryophytes
- Clade: Tracheophytes
- Clade: Spermatophytes
- Clade: Angiosperms
- Clade: Eudicots
- Clade: Rosids
- Order: Malvales
- Family: Malvaceae
- Subfamily: Sterculioideae
- Genus: Sterculia; L.

Type species
- Sterculia foetida L.

Species
- See text

Synonyms
- 19 synonyms: Astrodendrum Dennst.; Balanghas Raf.; Cavalam Adans.; Cavallium Schott; Chichaea C.Presl; Clompanus Raf.; Culhamia Forssk.; Delabechea Lindl.; Eribroma Pierre; Ivira Aubl.; Kavalama Raf.; Mateatia Vell.; Orsopea Raf.; Pompila Noronha; Southwellia Salisb.; Theodoria Neck.; Triphaca Lour.; Triplobus Raf.; Xylosterculia Kosterm.

= Sterculia =

Genus of flowering plants

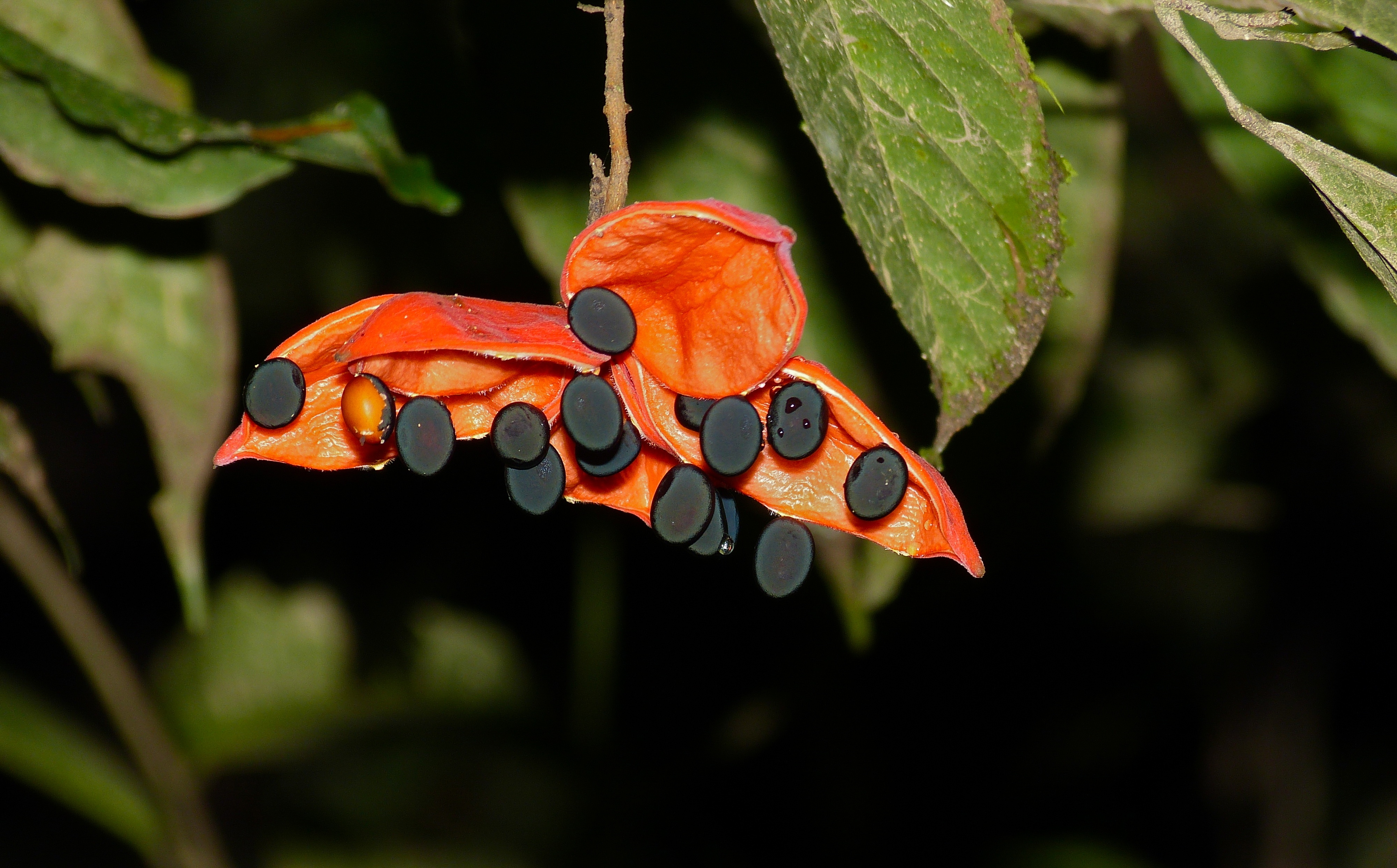
Ripe fruit capsules releasing their smooth seeds, Malaysia

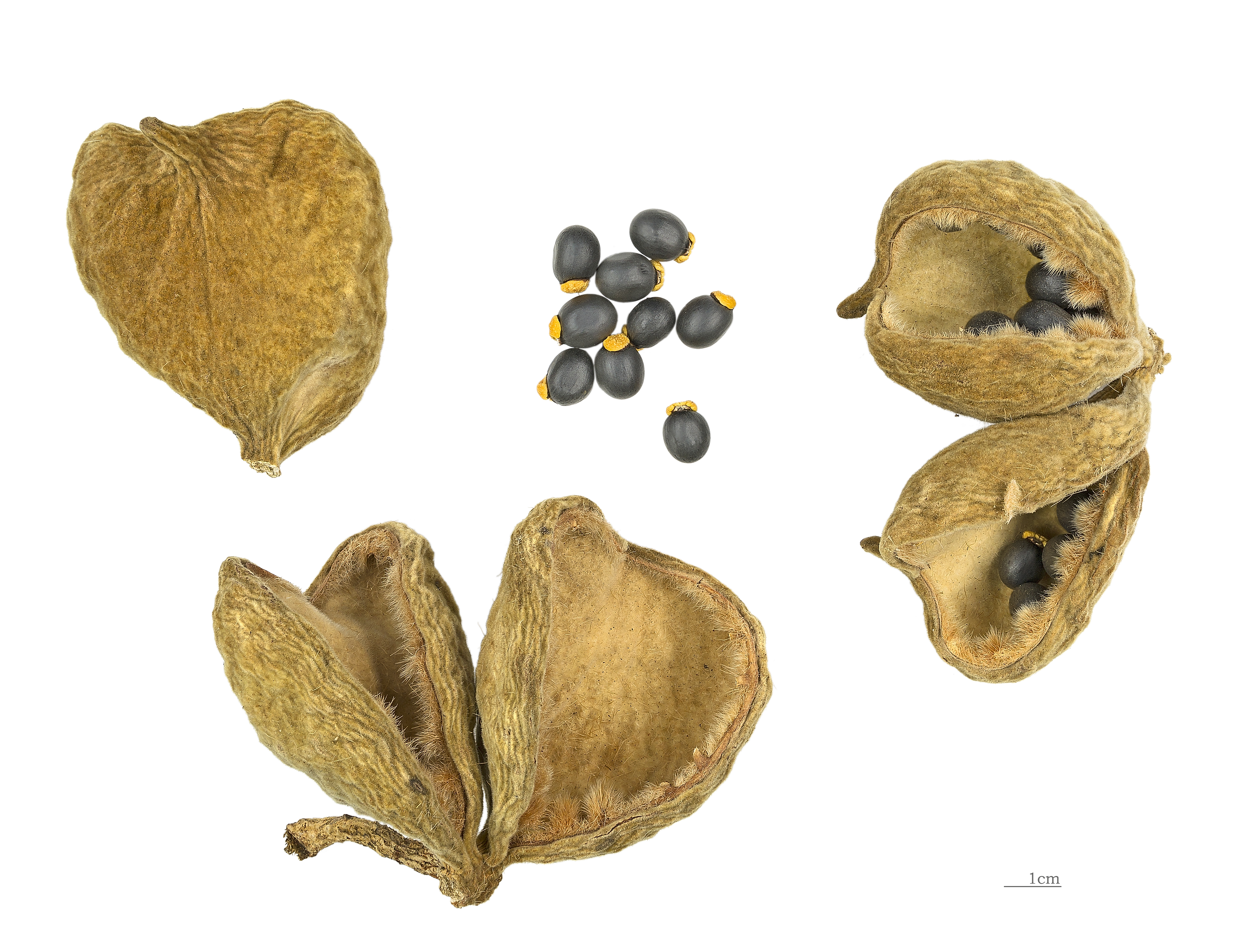
S. setigera, dry capsules and seeds – MHNT

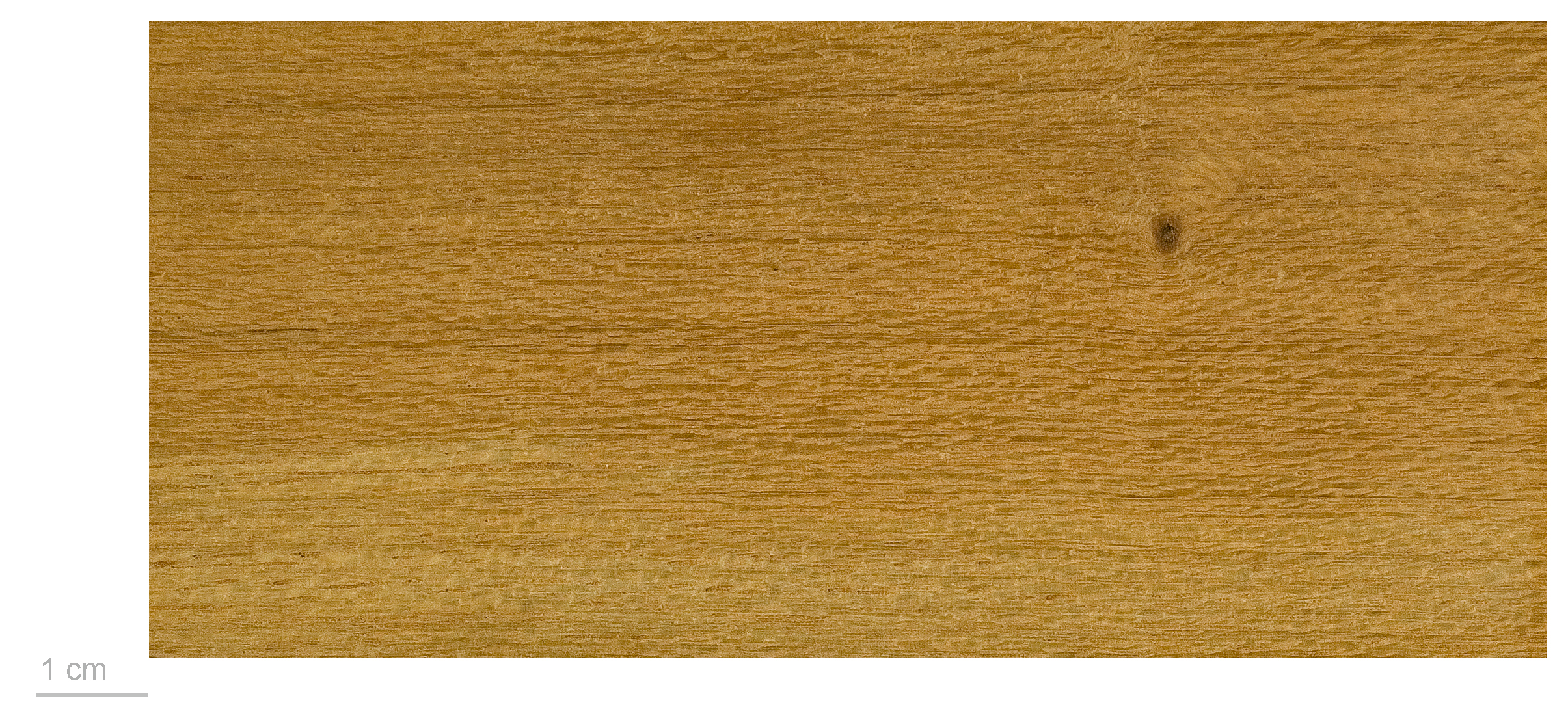
S. pruriens, wood texture – MHNT

Sterculia is a genus of about 180 species of flowering plants in the hibiscus family Malvaceae, subfamily Sterculioideae. It was formerly placed in the now obsolete family Sterculiaceae. Members of the genus are colloquially known as tropical chestnuts. Sterculia may be monoecious or dioecious, and its flowers unisexual or bisexual.

== Distribution ==
This genus is pan-tropical, with species occurring in tropical and subtropical parts of Africa, Asia, the Indo-Pacific region and the Americas.

== Taxonomy ==
=== Species ===
As of January 2026, Plants of the World Online accepts the following 183 species:

- Sterculia abbreviata E.L.Taylor ex Mondragón
- Sterculia aberrans Tardieu
- Sterculia acuminatissima Merr.
- Sterculia aerisperma Cuatrec.
- Sterculia africana (Lour.) Fiori
- Sterculia albidiflora Ducke
- Sterculia alexandri Harv.
- Sterculia allenii E.L.Taylor ex Al.Rodr. & D.Santam.
- Sterculia amazonica E.L.Taylor ex Mondragón
- Sterculia ampla Baker f.
- Sterculia apeibophylla Ducke
- Sterculia apetala (Jacq.) H.Karst.
- Sterculia appendiculata K.Schum.
- Sterculia backeri Tantra
- Sterculia balanghas L.
- Sterculia bammleri K.Schum.
- Sterculia blumei G.Don
- Sterculia bolavenensis Tagane & Soulad.
- Sterculia bracteata Gagnep.
- Sterculia brevissima H.H.Hsue ex Y.Tang, M.G.Gilbert & Dorr
- Sterculia campaniflora Ridl.
- Sterculia caribaea R.Br.
- Sterculia carrii Tantra
- Sterculia ceramica R.Br.
- Sterculia chapelieri Baill.
- Sterculia cheekii Dorr
- Sterculia chlamydothyrsa Mildbr.
- Sterculia chrysodasys Miq.
- Sterculia cinerea A.Rich.
- Sterculia cochinchinensis Pierre
- Sterculia cognata Prain
- Sterculia colombiana Sprague
- Sterculia comorensis Baill.
- Sterculia comosa Wall.
- Sterculia conwentzii K.Schum.
- Sterculia cordata Blume
- Sterculia corrugata Little
- Sterculia costaricana Pittier
- Sterculia crassinervia Miq.
- Sterculia cuneifolia Miq.
- Sterculia curiosa (Vell.) Taroda
- Sterculia cuspidata R.Br.
- Sterculia dactylocarpa Warb.
- Sterculia darbyshirei Tantra
- Sterculia dasyphylla A.C.Sm.
- Sterculia dawei Sprague
- Sterculia duckei E.L.Taylor ex J.A.C.Silva & M.F.Silva
- Sterculia edelfeltii F.Muell.
- Sterculia ellipticifolia Fosberg
- Sterculia elmeri Merr.
- Sterculia euosma W.W.Sm.
- Sterculia excelsa Mart.
- Sterculia fanaiho Setch.
- Sterculia foetida L.
- Sterculia forsteri Seem.
- Sterculia frondosa Rich.
- Sterculia gengmaensis H.H.Hsue ex Y.Tang, M.G.Gilbert & Dorr
- Sterculia gilva Miq.
- Sterculia glauca A.H.Gentry
- Sterculia gracilipes Pierre
- Sterculia grandifolia R.Br.
- Sterculia guangxiensis S.J.Xu & P.T.Li
- Sterculia guapayensis Cuatrec.
- Sterculia guianensis Sandwith
- Sterculia guttata Roxb.
- Sterculia hainanensis Merr. & Chun
- Sterculia harmandii Pierre
- Sterculia henryi Hemsl.
- Sterculia hewittii Ridl.
- Sterculia holtzei F.Muell.
- Sterculia hymenocalyx K.Schum.
- Sterculia hypochroa Pierre
- Sterculia hyposticta Miq.
- Sterculia impressinervis H.H.Hsue
- Sterculia insularis R.Br.
- Sterculia kayae P.E.Berry
- Sterculia khasiana Debb. ex Biswas
- Sterculia kingii Prain
- Sterculia kingtungensis H.H.Hsue ex Y.Tang, M.G.Gilbert & Dorr
- Sterculia konchurangensis C.N.Kieu, T.D.Binh & B.H.Quang
- Sterculia kostermansiana Tantra
- Sterculia lancaviensis Ridl.
- Sterculia lanceifolia Roxb.
- Sterculia lanceolata Cav.
- Sterculia lastoursvillensis M.Bodard & Pellegr.
- Sterculia laxiflora Rusby
- Sterculia lepidotostellata Mildbr.
- Sterculia linguifolia Mast.
- Sterculia lissophylla Pierre
- Sterculia longifolia Vent.
- Sterculia longipetiolata Merr.
- Sterculia macrophylla Vent.
- Sterculia macrostemon Tantra
- Sterculia madagascariensis R.Br.
- Sterculia maoana Doweld
- Sterculia mastersii Pierre
- Sterculia megistophylla Ridl.
- Sterculia membranacea Merr.
- Sterculia mexicana R.Br.
- Sterculia mhosya Engl.
- Sterculia micrantha Chun & H.H.Hsue
- Sterculia mindorensis Tantra
- Sterculia monosperma Vent.
- Sterculia monticola Mildbr.
- Sterculia morobeensis Tantra
- Sterculia multiovula E.L.Taylor ex Mondragón
- Sterculia murex Hemsl.
- Sterculia oblonga Mast.
- Sterculia oblongata R.Br.
- Sterculia ornatisepala E.L.Taylor ex D.Santam. & Al.Rodr.
- Sterculia palauensis Kaneh.
- Sterculia papuana Tantra
- Sterculia parkinsonii F.Muell.
- Sterculia parviflora Roxb. ex G.Don
- Sterculia parvifolia R.Br.
- Sterculia peekelii Mildbr.
- Sterculia pendula Ducke
- Sterculia perryae Kosterm.
- Sterculia peruviana (D.R.Simpson) E.L.Taylor ex Brako & Zarucchi
- Sterculia petenensis E.L.Taylor ex D.Santam. & Al.Rodr.
- Sterculia pexa Pierre
- Sterculia pinbienensis H.T.Tsai & P.I.Mao
- Sterculia pojoira Cuatrec.
- Sterculia ponapensis Kaneh.
- Sterculia principis Gagnep.
- Sterculia pruriens (Aubl.) K.Schum.
- Sterculia pseudopeltata Mildbr.
- Sterculia quadrifida R.Br.
- Sterculia quinqueloba (Garcke) K.Schum.
- Sterculia radicans Gagnep.
- Sterculia recordiana Standl.
- Sterculia rhinopetala K.Schum.
- Sterculia rhoidifolia Stapf ex Ridl.
- Sterculia rhynchocarpa K.Schum.
- Sterculia rhynchophylla K.Schum.
- Sterculia rigidifolia Ducke
- Sterculia ripicola Mildbr.
- Sterculia rogersii N.E.Br.
- Sterculia rubiginosa Vent.
- Sterculia rugosa R.Br.
- Sterculia sangirensis Warb.
- Sterculia scandens Hemsl.
- Sterculia schlechteri Mildbr.
- Sterculia schliebenii Mildbr.
- Sterculia scortechinii King
- Sterculia setigera Delile
- Sterculia shillinglawii F.Muell.
- Sterculia simaoensis Y.Y.Qian
- Sterculia spangleri R.Br.
- Sterculia spatulata Warb.
- Sterculia speciosa K.Schum.
- Sterculia stapfiana K.Schum.
- Sterculia stenocarpa H.J.P.Winkl.
- Sterculia steyermarkii E.L.Taylor ex Mondragón
- Sterculia stigmarota Pierre
- Sterculia stipulata Korth.
- Sterculia stipulifera Ducke
- Sterculia striata A.St.-Hil. & Naudin
- Sterculia striatiflora Mast.
- Sterculia subnobilis H.H.Hsue
- Sterculia subpeltata Blume
- Sterculia subracemosa Chun & H.H.Hsue
- Sterculia subviolacea K.Schum.
- Sterculia tannaensis Guillaumin
- Sterculia tantraensis Morat
- Sterculia tavia Baill.
- Sterculia tessmannii Mildbr.
- Sterculia thorelii Pierre
- Sterculia tonkinensis Aug.DC.
- Sterculia tragacantha Lindl.
- Sterculia tragacanthoides Engl.
- Sterculia urceolata Sm.
- Sterculia urens Roxb.
- Sterculia urophylla Merr.
- Sterculia venezuelensis Pittier
- Sterculia versicolor Wall.
- Sterculia villifera Steud.
- Sterculia villosa Roxb. ex Sm.
- Sterculia vitiensis Seem.
- Sterculia xolocotzii T.Wendt & E.L.Taylor
- Sterculia yatesii Merr.
- Sterculia yuanjiangensis H.H.Hsue & S.J.Xu
- Sterculia zeylanica Kosterm.

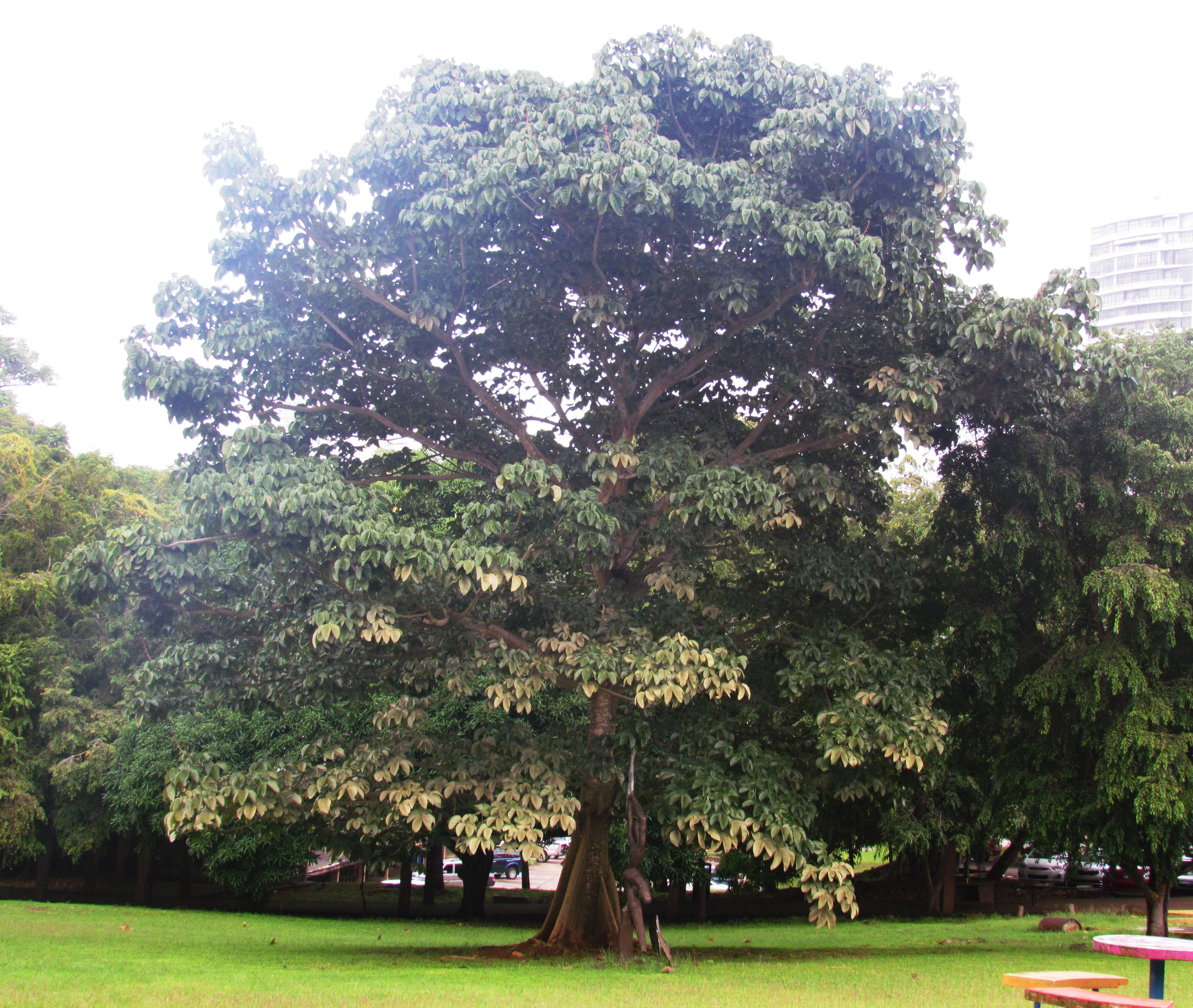
Panama tree, S. apetala

=== Fossil record ===
A 27-million-year-old †Sterculia labrusca leaf fossil is described from the Evros region in Western Thrace, Greece.

=== Etymology ===
The scientific name is taken from Sterculius of Roman mythology, who was the god of manure; this is in reference to the unpleasant aroma of the flowers of this genus (e.g. Sterculia foetida).

== Ecology ==
Sterculia species are food plants for the larvae of some Lepidoptera species including the leaf miner Bucculatrix xenaula, which feeds exclusively on this genus.

== Toxicity and uses ==
The pods, particularly those of S. foetida, contain seeds reported to be edible, with a taste similar to cocoa. However, the oil contains cyclopropene fatty acids which could be carcinogenic or co-carcinogenic.

Gum karaya is extracted from Sterculia species, and is used as a thickener and emulsifier in foods, as a laxative, and as a denture adhesive. In India, this is sourced from: Gujarat, Maharashtra, Madras, Madhya Pradesh and Chhota Nagpur.
