= Neem gum =

Neem gum is a natural resin extracted from the Neem tree by induced or natural injury. Neem gum is clear, bright and amber-coloured material non-bitter in taste and is soluble in cold water. It is used as a bulking agent and for the preparation of special purpose food (those for diabetics).

Pharmaceutical applications of neem gum include use as a tablet binder, thickening agent, slow-release agent, and film coating. There is also some use for enhancing solubility.

Neem gum is also used in silk dying.
