= Gum karaya =

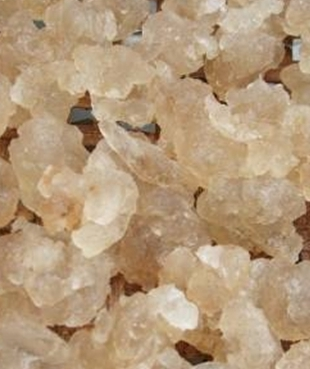

Names
- Other names Sterculia gum; Gum Sterculia; Indian gum tragacanth

Identifiers
CAS Number	9000-36-6
ECHA InfoCard	100.029.570
EC Number	232-539-4
E number	E416 (thickeners, ...)
UNII	73W9IQY50Q
CompTox Dashboard (EPA)	DTXSID7044182
- Except where otherwise noted, data are given for materials in their standard state (at 25 °C [77 °F], 100 kPa). Infobox references

Gum karaya or gum sterculia, also known as Indian gum tragacanth, is a vegetable gum produced as an exudate by trees of the genus Sterculia. Chemically, gum karaya is an acid polysaccharide composed of the sugars galactose, rhamnose and galacturonic acid. It is used as a thickener and emulsifier in foods, as a laxative, and as a denture adhesive. It is also used to adulterate Gum tragacanth due to their similar physical characteristics. As a food additive it has E number E416.

Gum karaya can be obtained from the tree Sterculia urens. It is a valuable substance and is traditionally tapped by cutting or peeling back the bark, or by making deep gashes at the base of the trunk with an axe. These crude methods of extraction often resulted in the death of the tree, but it has been found that application of the plant growth regulator ethephon stimulates the production of gum, and when used in carefully controlled amounts, increases gum yield and enhances healing of the wounds and survival of the tree.
