= Quinazoline alkaloids =

Quinazoline, the parent compound of the quinazoline alkaloids.

Quinazoline alkaloids are natural products from the group of alkaloids, which are chemically derived from quinazoline. Some quinazoline alkaloids show bronchodilatory effects and stimulate respiration. An abortive effect was also found for vasicine in studies on rats and rabbits.

== Examples ==
About 70 alkaloids with a quinazoline structure are known, which are mostly further classified as simple quinazolinones, pyrroloquinazolines, pyrido[2,1-b]quinazolines and indoloquinazolines.

Vasicine

Evodiamine

Rutaecarpine

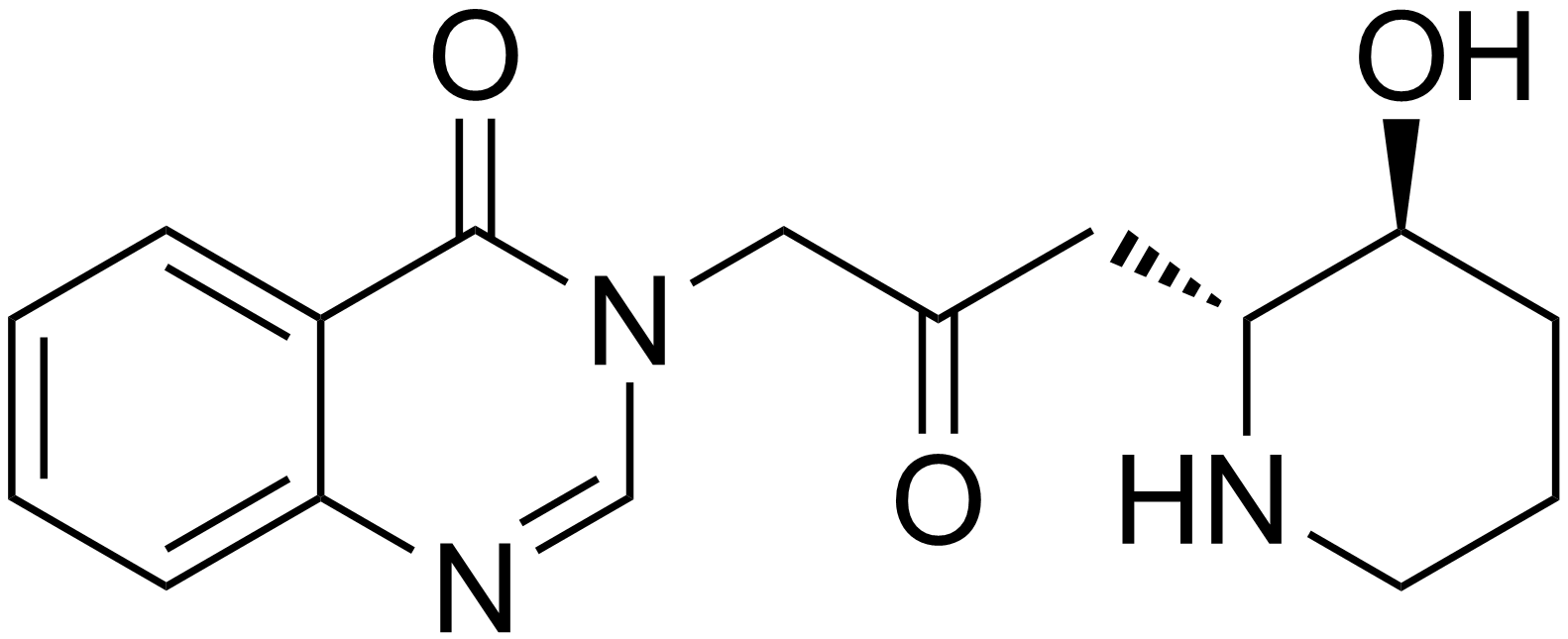
Febrifugine

== Occurrence ==
Quinazoline alkaloids can be found mainly in plants, such as acanthaceae (Adhatoda vasica), rutaceae, saxifragaceae (Dichroa febrifuga) and in linaria species (Scrophulariaceae) and peganum harmala (Fam. Zygophyllaceae); also in animals (e. g. tetrodotoxin) and bacteria.
