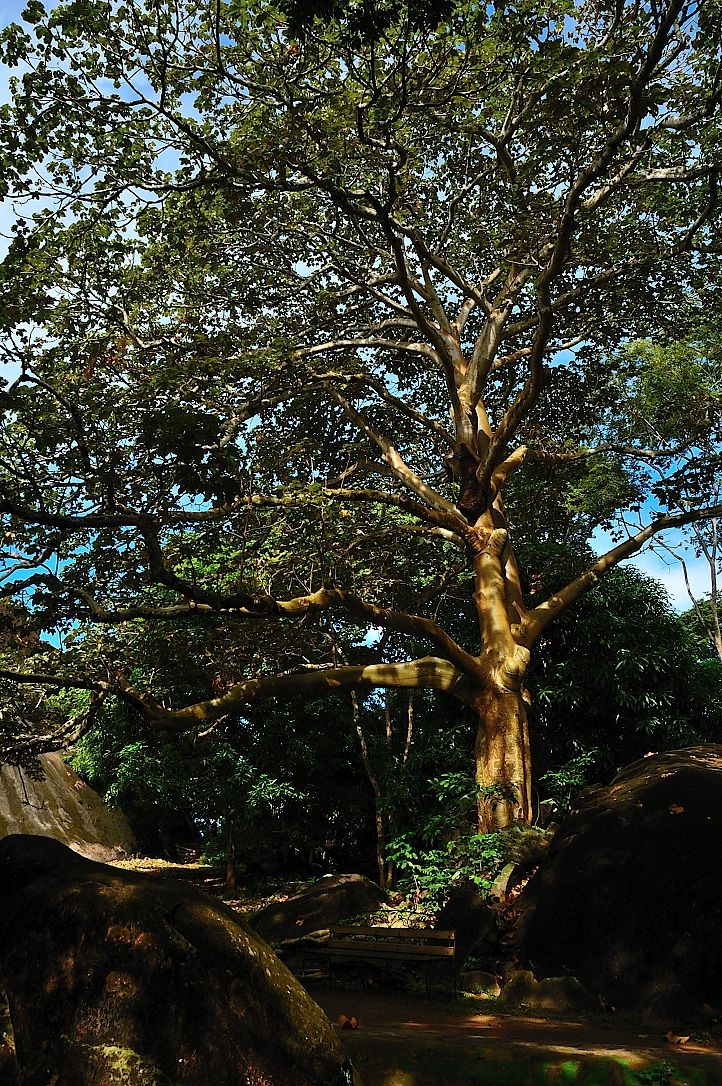
- On the bank of the Orinoco, Venezuela

Scientific classification
- Kingdom: Plantae
- Clade: Tracheophytes
- Clade: Angiosperms
- Clade: Eudicots
- Clade: Rosids
- Order: Malvales
- Family: Malvaceae
- Genus: Sterculia
- Species: S. apetala

Binomial name
- Sterculia apetala (Jacq.) H.Karst.

Synonyms
- Clompanus apetala (Jacq.) Kuntze; Clompanus chichus (A. St.-Hil. ex Turpin) Kuntze; Clompanus punctatus (DC.) Kuntze; Helicteres apetala Jacq.; Sterculia capitata G. Karst. ex F. Seym.; Sterculia carthaginensis Cav. nom. illeg.; Sterculia chicha A. St.-Hil. ex Turpin; Sterculia elata Ducke; Sterculia punctata DC.

= Sterculia apetala =

Species of tree

Sterculia apetala, the Panama tree, is a species of flowering plant in the family Malvaceae. It is found in Florida, southern Mexico, Central America, and northern South America, and has been introduced to the Caribbean islands. Sterculia apetala is recognized as the national tree of the Republic of Panama.

== Description ==
Sterculia apetala is perennial and deciduous. Trunks are straight, cylindrical, and have large buttresses at the base. Height ranges from 20 to 40 meters (66 to 131 ft).

Leaves are alternate, palmate with five lobes, and cluster densely at the end of branches. Including the petiole, leaf length ranges from 15 to 50 centimeters (5.9 to 20 in).

Flowers are purple and yellow, and have five sepals. S. apetala flowers have no petals; structures that resemble them are in fact sepals. Flower diameter ranges between 2.5–3.5 centimeters (0.98–1.4 in). These flowers are unisexual, meaning there are distinct male and female individuals used for reproduction.

Fruit are compounds of up to five follicles, stemming from peduncles that can reach as long as 30 centimeters (12 in). Inside the follicles are seeds, as well as orange urticating hairs that may cause pain when touched. Naturally, the tree typically flowers and bears fruit between December and March.

Seeds are black ellipsoids, typically with the dimensions 2.5 cm × 1.5 cm (0.98 in × 0.59 in). These seeds contain sterculic acid and malvalic acid, two types of cyclopropene fatty acids. Antioxidant compounds can be obtained from the seeds via continuous or batch extractions using water or ethanol as solvents.

== Taxonomy and nomenclature ==
Spanish names for the species include camoruco, manduvi or anacagüita, Sterculia apetala belongs to the genus Sterculia, classified in the mallow family Malvaceae. It is one of 150 known species of Sterculia.

The generic name Sterculia is derived from the Latin word stercus, which translates to "excrement". This is because of the strong odor characteristic of flowers and leaves within this genus. Its specific epithet refers to its lack of petals.

== Distribution ==
Sterculia apetala is found in the tropical regions of Florida, Mexico, Central America, Trinidad and Tobago, Bolivia, northern Brazil, Colombia, Ecuador, Peru, and Venezuela (including the Venezuelan Antilles).

== Uses ==
Wood from Sterculia apetala is used to produce cases, crates, industrial and domestic woodware, canoes, and tool handles. The tree is often grown for shade, resulting from its large leaves. In some regions, seeds are consumed after being boiled or roasted, used to flavor chocolate, or given to animals as fodder. The flowers are used as antitussive.

== Conservation ==
In the Pantanal wetlands of Central Brazil, the endangered hyacinth macaw (Anodorhynchus hyacinthinus) makes its nest almost exclusively in the natural hollows of S. apetala.

== Gallery ==
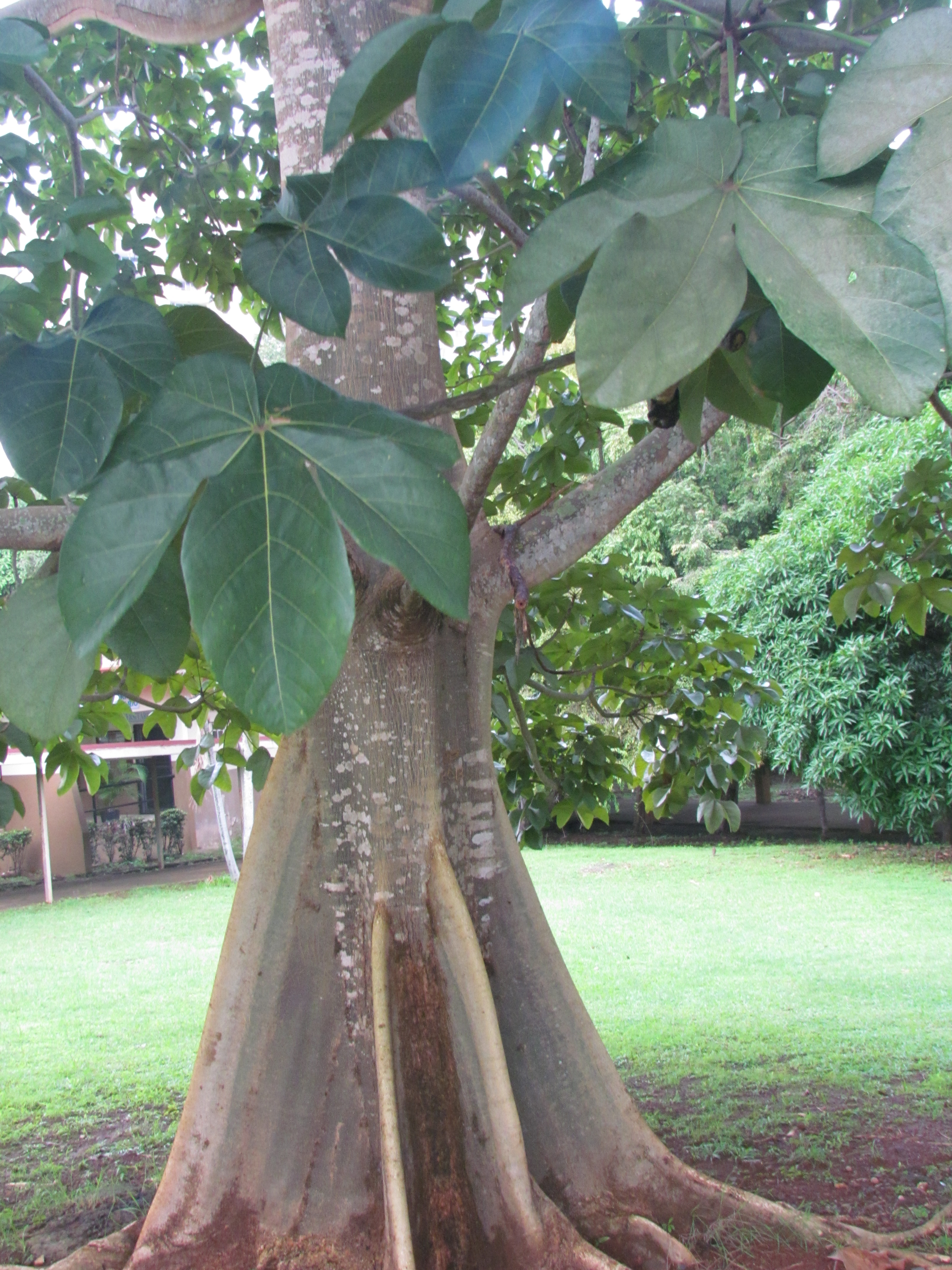
Sterculia apetala tree and leaves

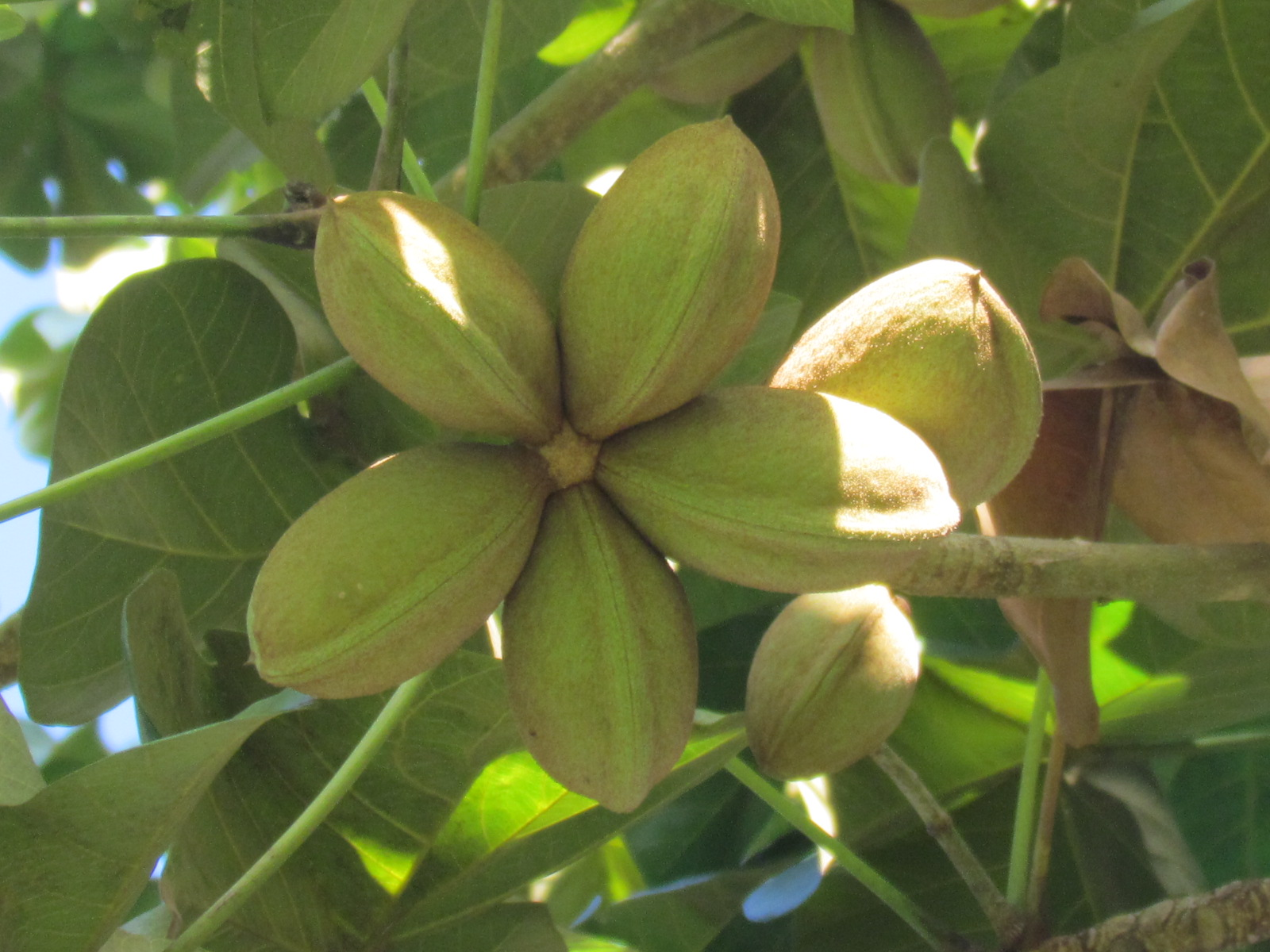
S. apetala fruit

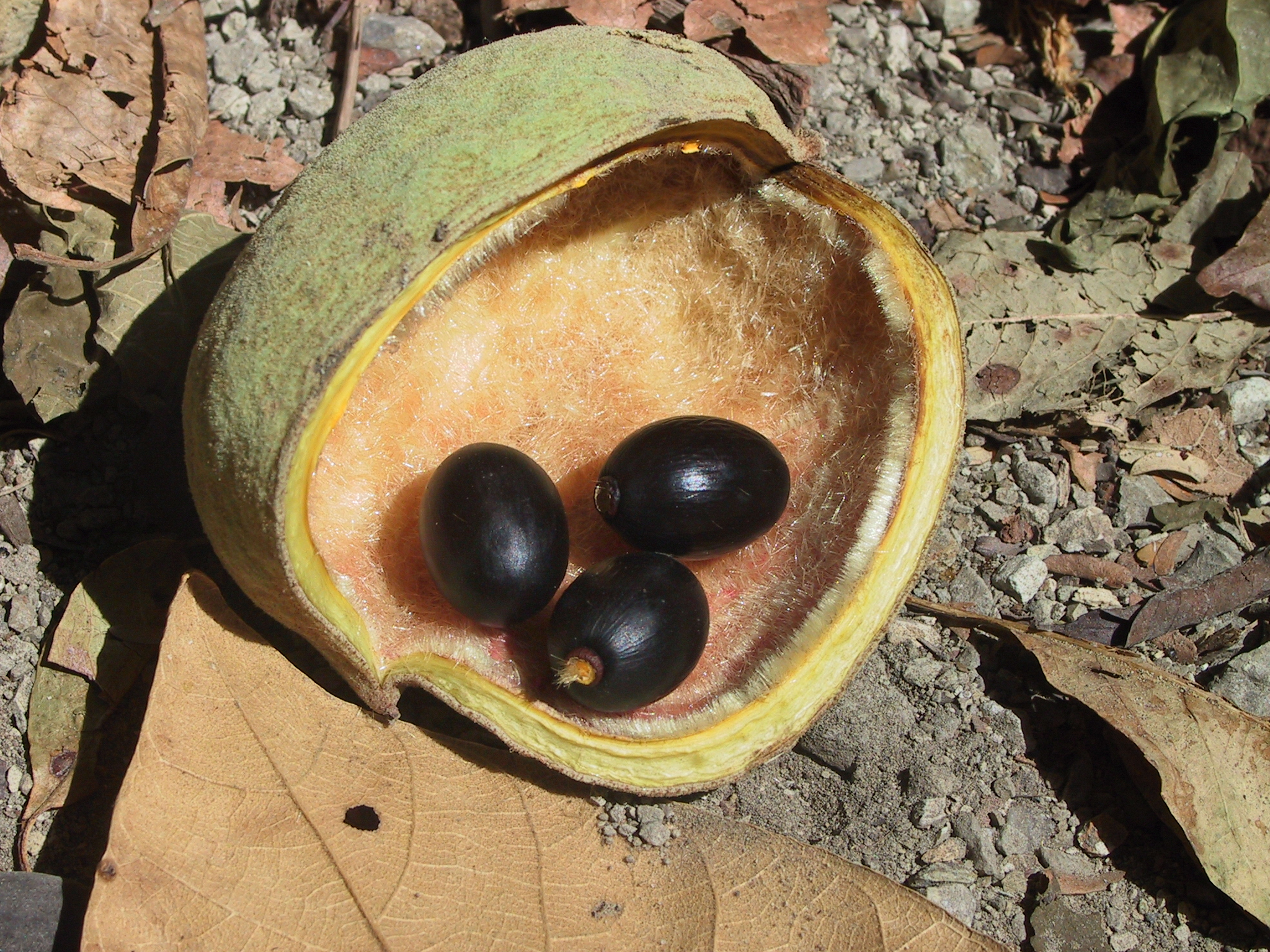
S. apetala follicle and seeds

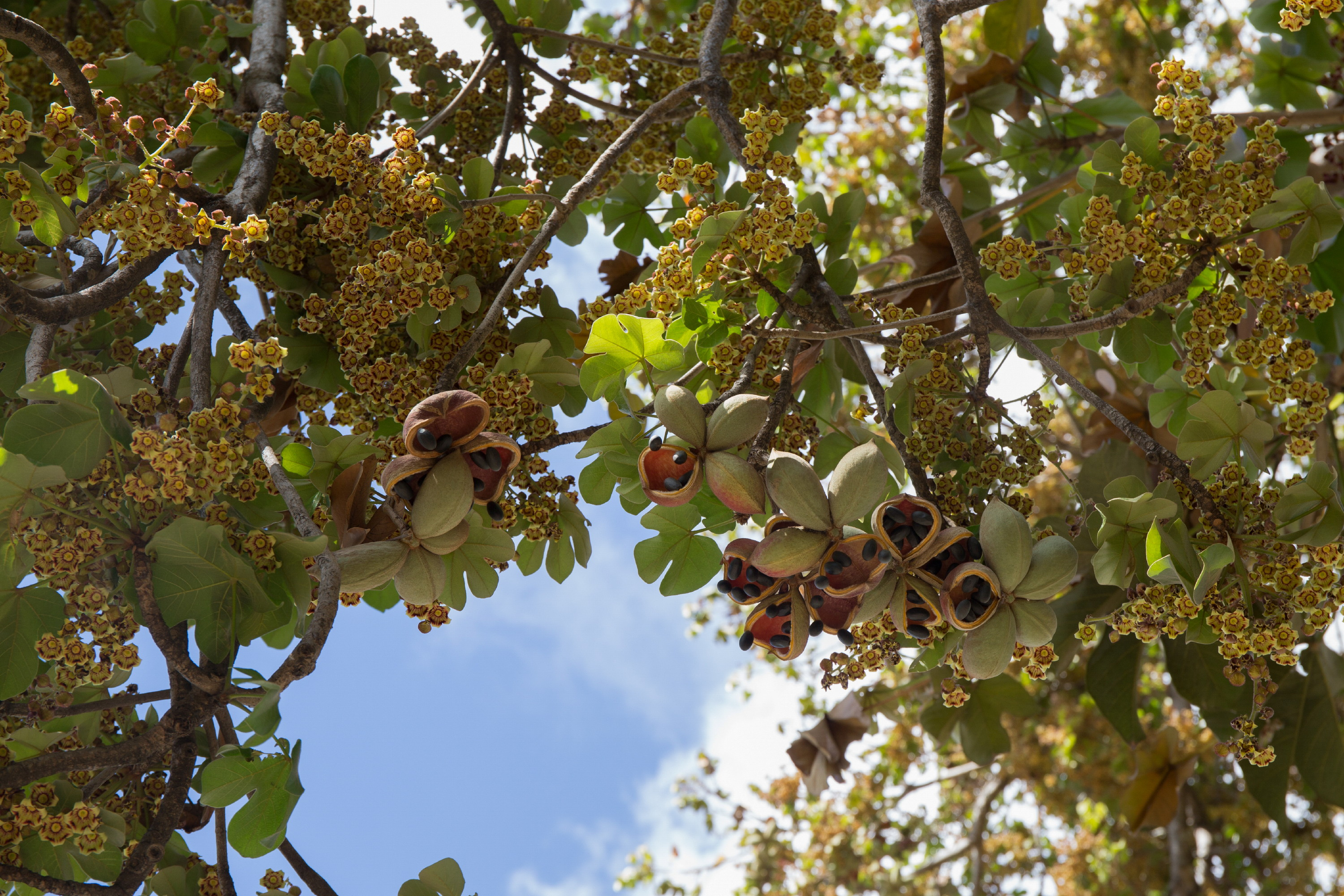
S. apetala fruit and flowers

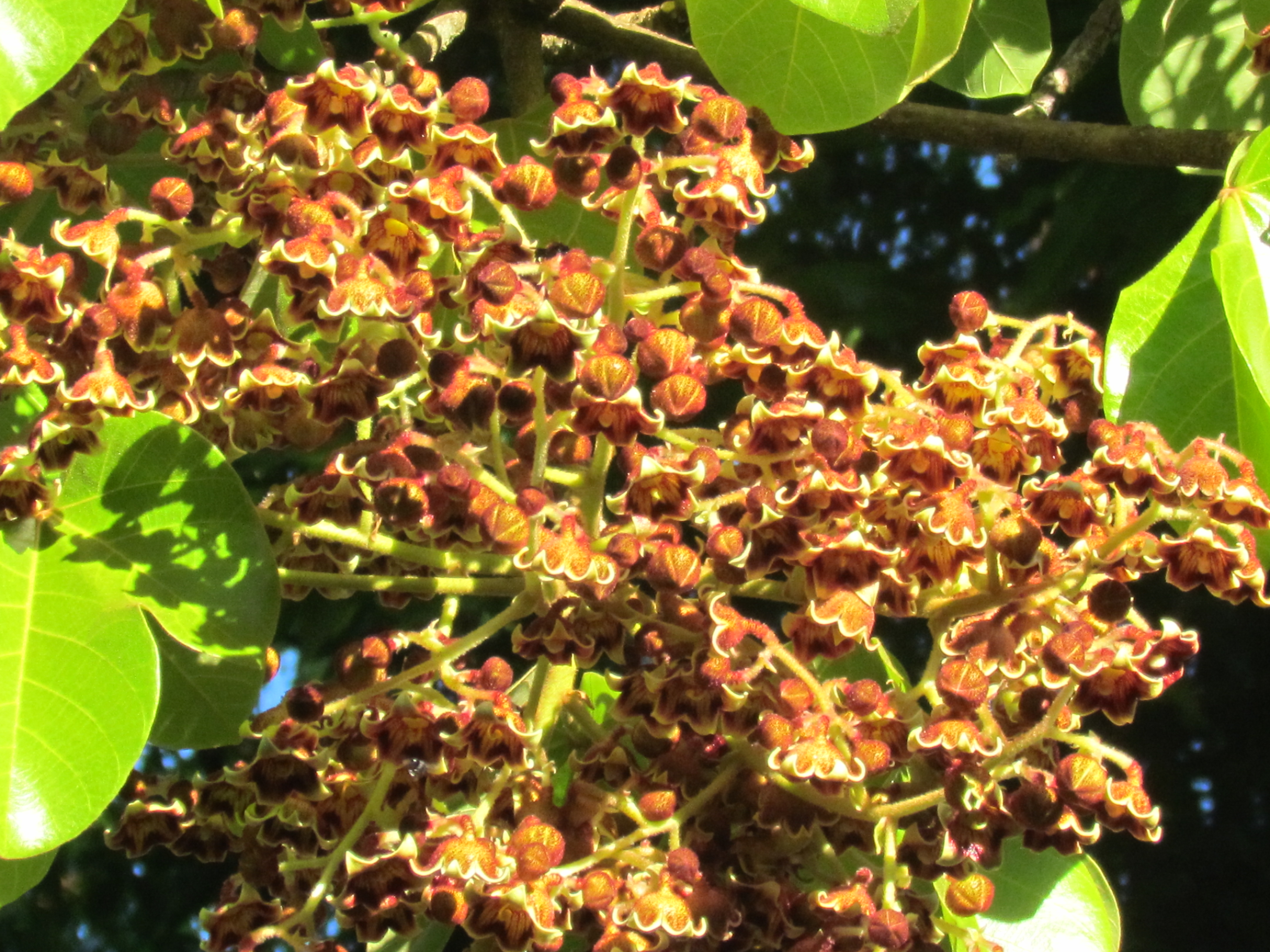
S. apetala flower cluster

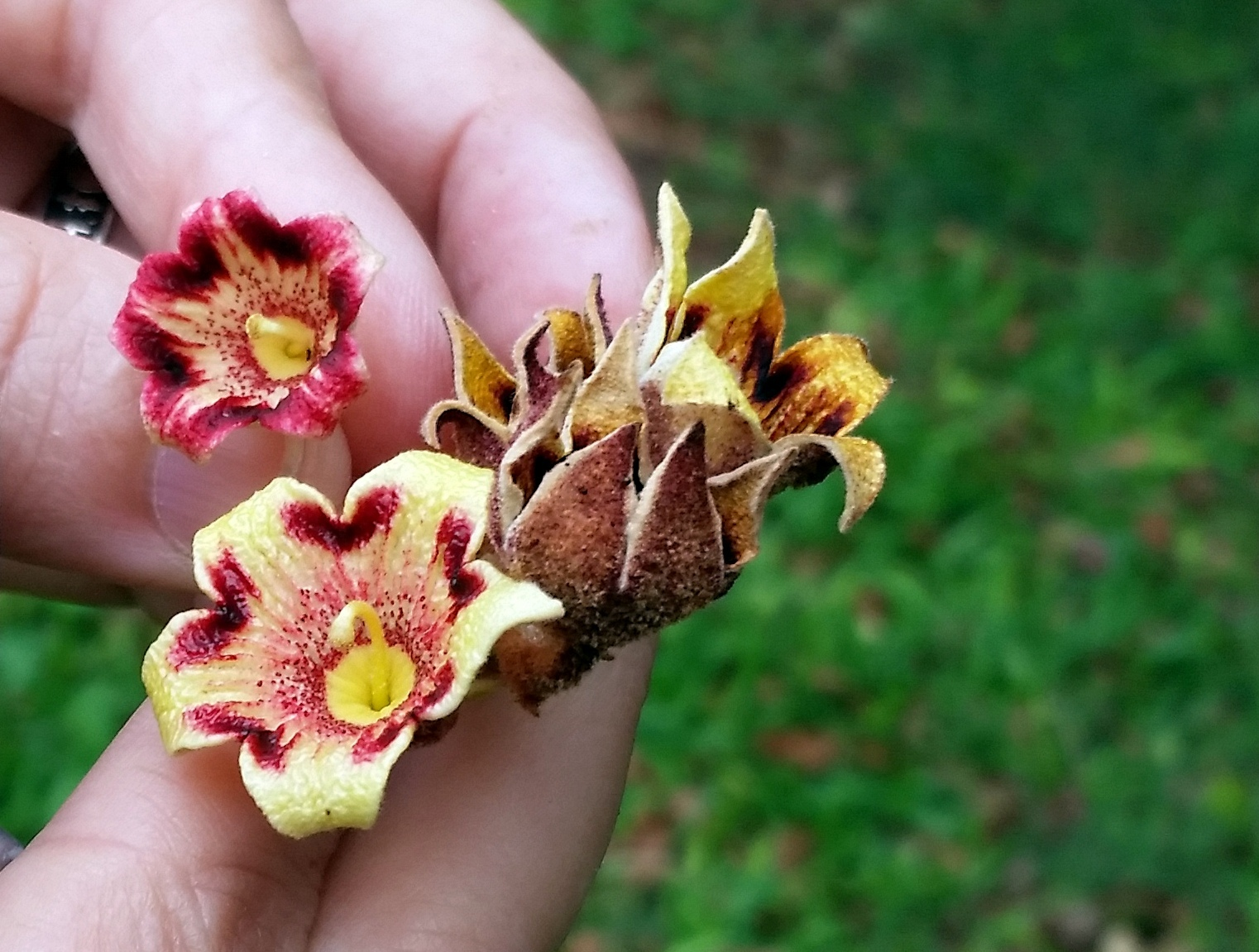
S. apetala individual flowers

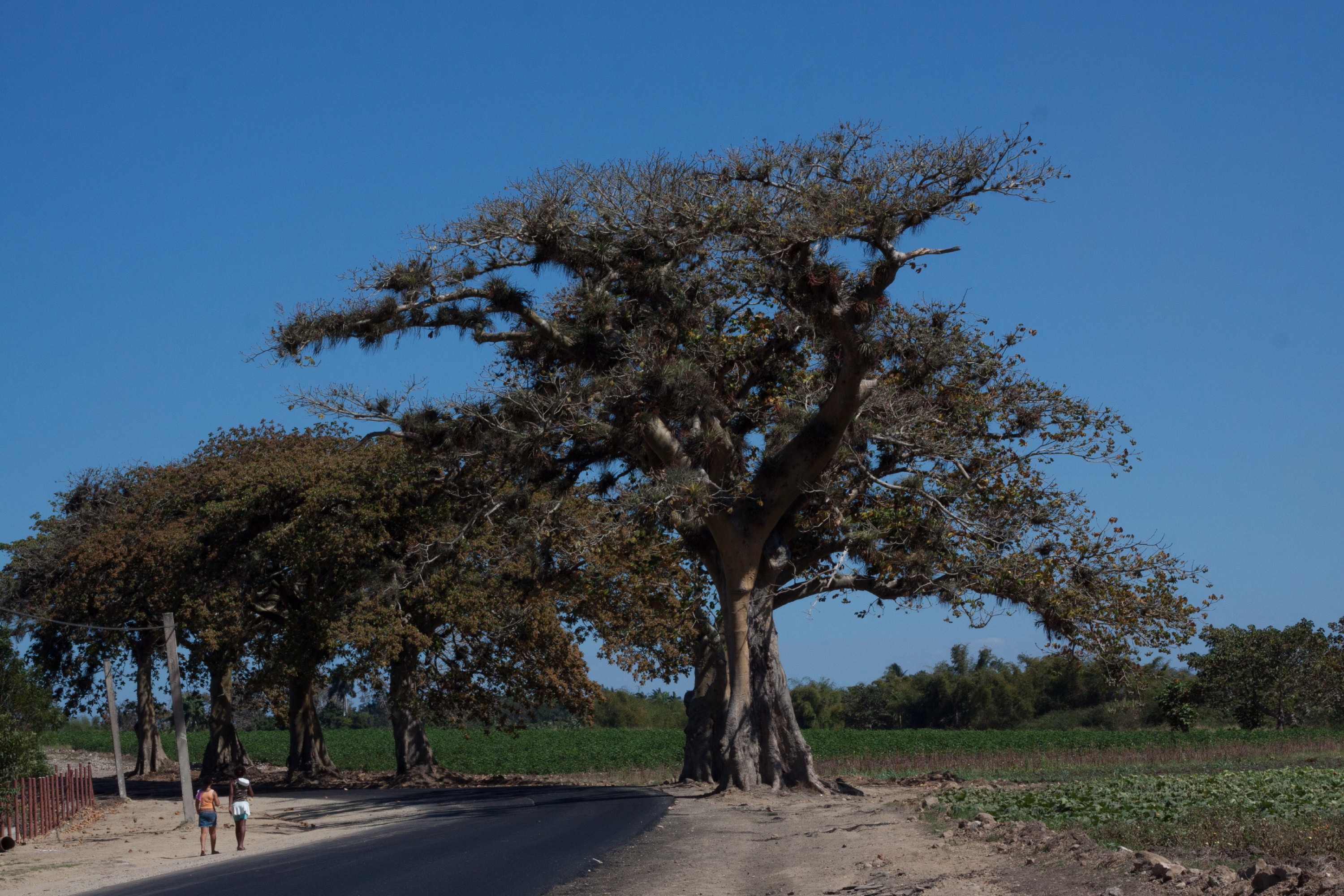
S. apetala old trees

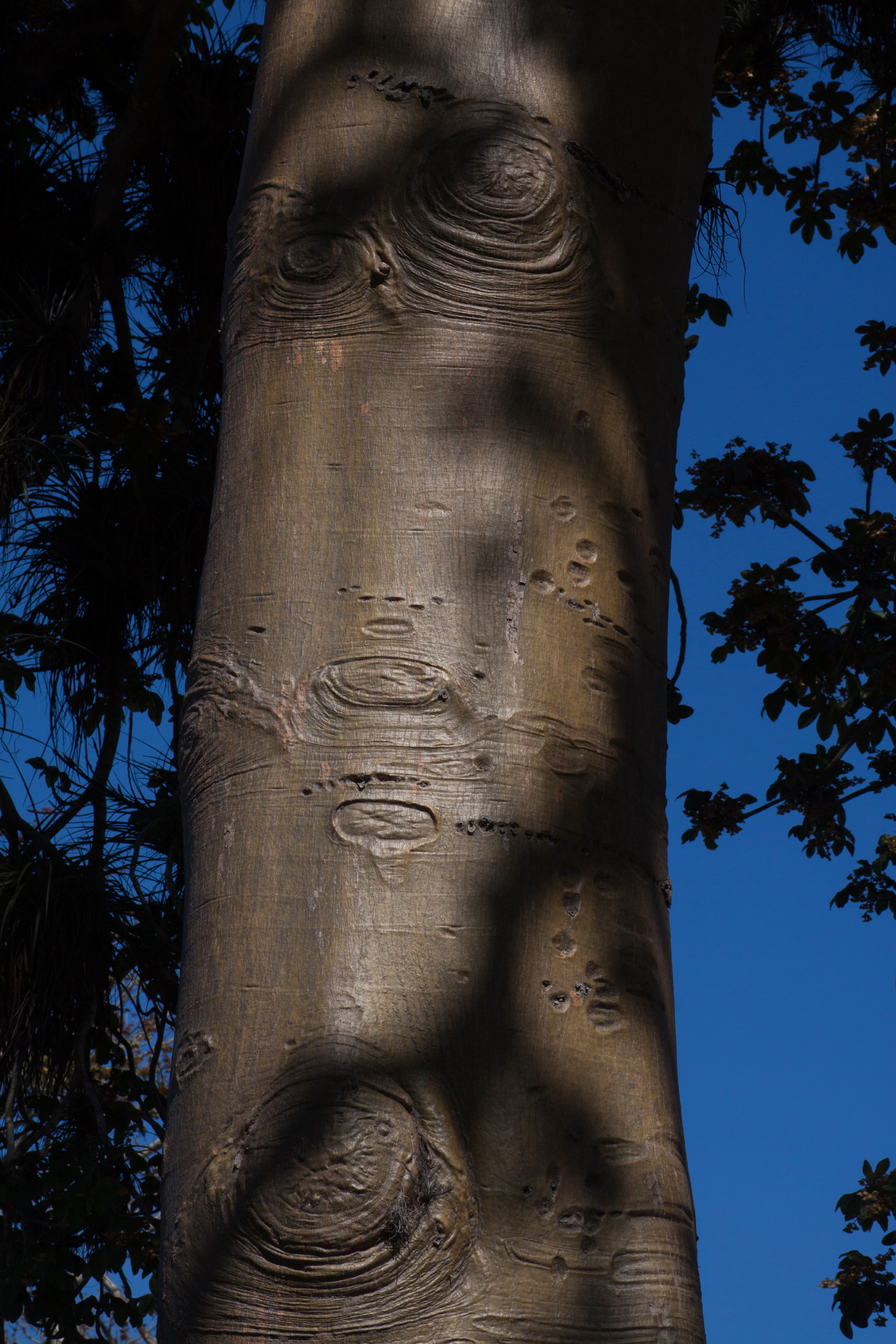
S. apetala trunk and bark
