= Sterquilinus =

God of odor in Roman mythology

In ancient Roman religion, Sterquilinus — also called Stercutus and Sterculius — was a god of odor. He may have been equivalent to Picumnus. The Larousse Encyclopaedia of Mythology gives the name as Stercutius, a pseudonym of Saturn, under which the latter used to supervise the manuring of the fields.

The name Sterquilinus comes from the Latin stercus meaning "fertilizer" or "manure". His name was altered to avoid confusion.

Early Romans were an agrarian civilization and, functionally, most of their original pantheon of gods — as against the later ones they adapted to Greek stereotypes — were of a rural nature with figures such as Pomona, Ceres, Flora, Dea Dia; so it was apt to have a god supervising the basics of organic fertilization. Sterquilinus essentially taught the use of manure in agricultural processes. He was not the sole deity of feces on its own; as in, sewage.

Modern writers later elaborated upon and exaggerated the significance of Sterquilinus/Sterculius and other "earthy" deities of antiquity, sometimes with moralistic disapproval. One editor of An Encyclopædia of Plants, published in 1836, related that

Sterculius was the god of the privy, from stercus, excrement. It has been well observed by a French author, that the Romans, in the madness of paganism, finished by deifying the most immodest objects and the most disgusting actions. They had the gods Sterculius, Crepitus, Priapus; and the goddesses Caca, Pertunda, &c, &c.

== Popular culture references ==
Sterculius was featured in "Peace, Love and Understanding" (1992), the second pilot episode of Beavis and Butt-Head, where his spirit rose from a port-a-potty crushed by a monster truck; he is correctly identified by Butt-Head.

== Namesakes ==
The following terms and names are derived from Sterculius:

- Sterculiaceae, a family of flowering plants
  - Sterculioideae, a subfamily of the family Malvaceae
    - Sterculia, a genus of flowering plants in the mallow family, Malvaceae (a reference to unpleasant aroma)
- Stercorariidae, the skua family of sea birds (the food disgorged by other birds when pursued by skuas was once thought to be excrement)
  - Stercorarius a genus in the family Stercorariidae
- "Stercoreus" group of the fungus genus Cyathus, including C. stercoreus (the splash-cup bird's nest, or dung-loving bird's nest)
- Strongyloides stercoralis, a nematode parasite living in the small intestines of humans
- Penestola stercoralis, a moth in the family Crambidae
- Stercoral ulcer, sometimes leading to stercoral perforation
- Typhlitis stercoralis, typhlitis resulting from retention of feces in the caecum
- Stercoraceous vomiting, or fecal vomiting
- Stercorin, or coprostanol, a compound frequently used as a biomarker for the presence of human feces in the environment
- Stercorite, a mineral originally discovered in guano
- Stercolith, a fecolith
- Stercoranism, the doctrine that consecrated elements of the Eucharist become feces after ingestion
- Stercorary, a place, properly secured from the weather, for containing feces
- Stercoration, an obsolete English term for manuring with dung
- Stercoricolous, a term for organisms inhabiting deposits of excrement
- Sterculic acid, the cyclopropene fatty acid 8-(2-octylcyclopropenyl) octanoic acid, found in some tropical vegetable oils
- Strocoulious - an approximately 23 year old (as of 2020) Red Eared Slider turtle that lives in Halifax Nova Scotia.
