= Unsaturated-phospholipid methyltransferase =

Unsaturated-phospholipid methyltransferase may refer to:

- Methylene-fatty-acyl-phospholipid synthase
- Cyclopropane-fatty-acyl-phospholipid synthase
