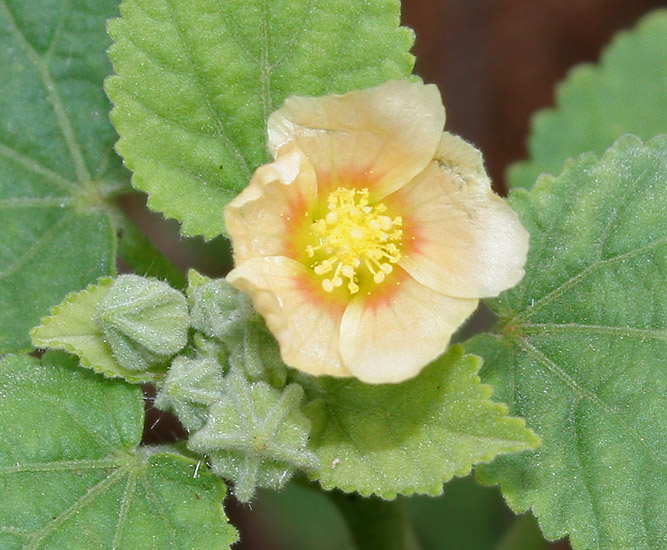

Scientific classification
- Kingdom: Plantae
- Clade: Tracheophytes
- Clade: Angiosperms
- Clade: Eudicots
- Clade: Rosids
- Order: Malvales
- Family: Malvaceae
- Genus: Sida
- Species: S. cordifolia

Binomial name
- Sida cordifolia L.

= Sida cordifolia =

Species of shrub

Sida cordifolia (‘ilima, flannel weed, bala, country mallow or heart-leaf sida) is a perennial subshrub of the mallow family Malvaceae native to India. It has naturalized throughout the world, and is considered an invasive weed in Africa, Australia, the southern United States, Hawaiian Islands, New Guinea, and French Polynesia. The specific name, cordifolia, refers to the heart-shaped leaf.

== Description ==
Sida cordifolia is an erect perennial that reaches 50 to 200 cm (20 to 79 in) tall, with the entire plant covered with soft white felt-like hair that is responsible for one of its common names, "flannel weed". The stems are yellow-green, hairy, long, and slender. The yellow-green leaves are oblong-ovate, covered with hairs, and 3.5 to 7.5 cm (1.4 to 3.0 in) long by 2.5 to 6 cm (0.98 to 2.36 in) wide. The flowers are dark yellow, sometimes with a darker orange center, with a hairy 5-lobed calyx and 5-lobed corolla.

As a weed, it invades cultivated and overgrazed fields, competing with more desired species and contaminating hay.

== Medicinal use ==
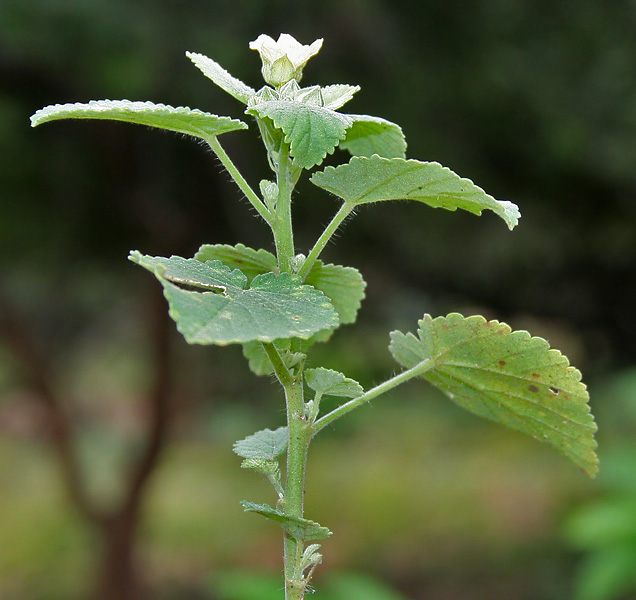
in Hyderabad, India.

Sida cordifolia is used in Ayurvedic medicine (Sanskrit:-BALA).

Known as "malva branca", it is a plant used in Brazilian folk medicine for the treatment of inflammation of the oral mucosa, blennorrhea, asthmatic bronchitis and nasal congestion, stomatitis, of asthma and nasal congestion and in many parts of Africa for various ailments, particularly for respiratory problems. It has been investigated as an anti-inflammatory, for preventing cell proliferation, and for encouraging liver re-growth. Because of its ephedrine content, it possesses psychostimulant properties, affecting the central nervous system and also the heart.

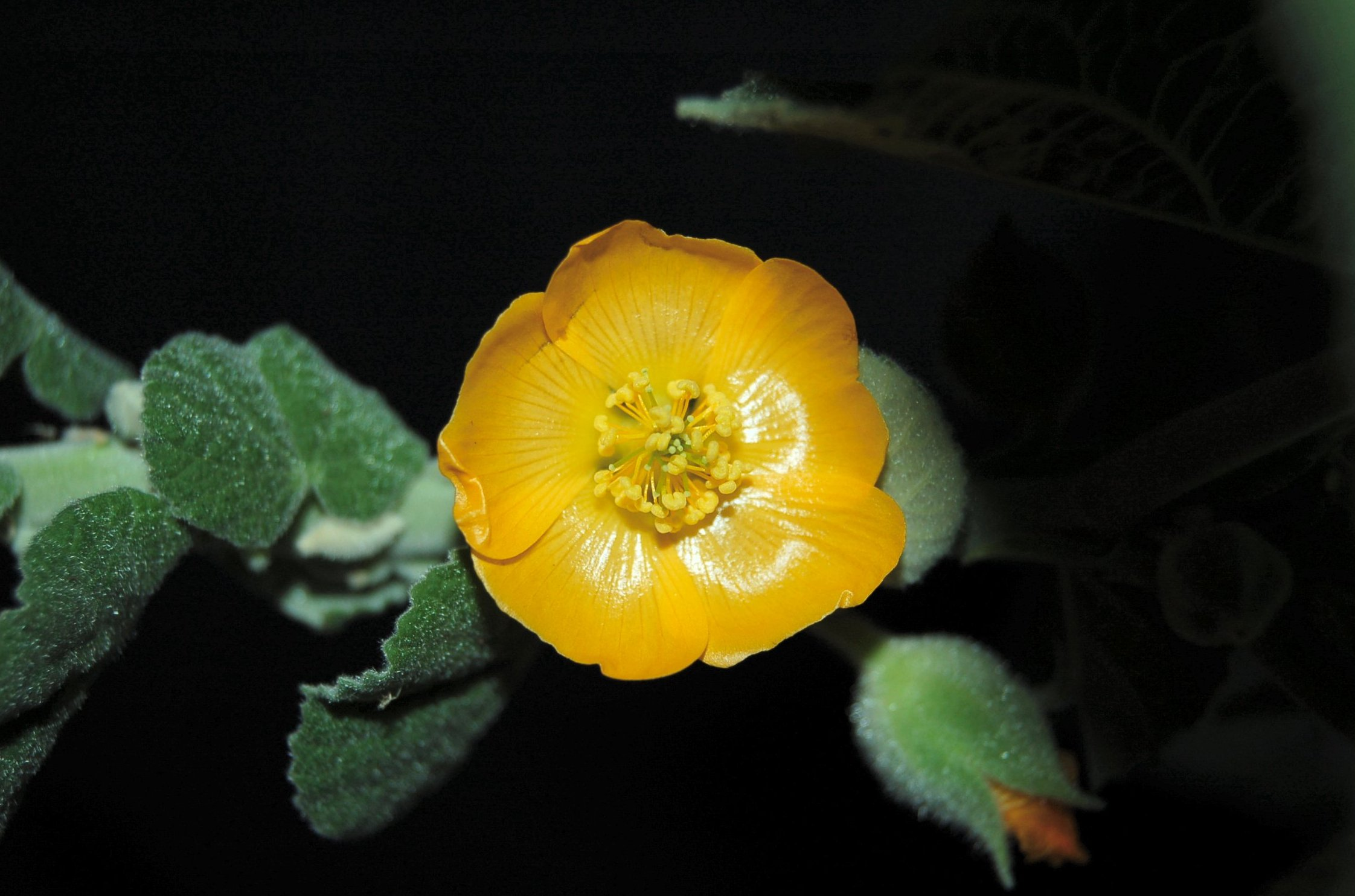
Sida cordifolia flower

== Phytochemistry ==
The following alkaloids were reported from S. cordifolia growing in India: β-phenethylamine, ephedrine, pseudoephedrine, S-(+)-N_{b}-methyltryptophan methyl ester, hypaphorine, vasicinone, vasicinol, choline, and betaine.

No tannin or glycosides have been identified from the plant. The roots and stems contain the alkaloid ephedrine, normally observed in the different varieties of the gymnosperm genus Ephedra. Recent analyses have revealed that ephedrine and pseudoephedrine constitute the major alkaloids from the aerial parts of the plant, which also show traces of sitosterol and palmitic, stearic and hexacosanoic acids. Two flavanones—5,7-dihydroxy-3-isoprenyl flavone and 5-hydroxy-3-isoprenyl flavone—and two phytosterols—β-sitosterol and stigmasterol—have been isolated from the plant. The analgesic alkaloid (5′-Hydroxymethyl-1′-(1,2,3,9-tetrahydro-pyrrolo [2,1-b] quinazolin-1-yl)-heptan-1-one) has also been found. Sterculic acid, malvalic acid, and coronaric acid have been isolated from the seed oil, along with other fatty acids.
