= C11H10N2O2 =

The molecular formula C_{11}H_{10}N_{2}O_{2} (molar mass: 202.21 g/mol, exact mass: 202.0742 u) may refer to:

- Tolimidone
- Vasicinone
