= Lantung =

Traditional fabric from Bengkulu, Indonesia

Lantung is a traditional fabric originating from Bengkulu, Indonesia. This fabric has a long history related to the Japanese colonial period in 1943. During that time, Indonesia experienced an economic crisis and had difficulty obtaining raw materials for clothing. As a solution, the people of Bengkulu began to utilize the bark of certain trees to make fabric, known as "Lantung".

== History ==
Lantung emerged during the Japanese occupation, when many clothing materials were difficult to obtain due to supply shortages and colonial government policies. As an alternative, the Bengkulu community utilized bark from trees such as rubber, ibuh (Fig tree), terap (Scholar tree), or old kedui (Sterculia). The bark was processed manually to produce cloth that could be used as clothing.

Lantung cloth became a solution for the clothing needs of the community who had difficulty obtaining textile materials at that time. The process of making this cloth also shows the creativity of the community in surviving in the midst of difficulties.

== Making process ==
The making of Lantung cloth begins with the collection of bark from certain trees. The bark is then beaten with a special tool until it widens and thins. This process aims to soften the wood fibers, so that the bark can be more easily made into cloth. After being processed, the bark is cleaned, dried in the sun, and finally sewn to form a cloth that is ready to be used.

== Philosophy and Meaning ==
Lantung cloth not only has practical value as clothing, but also holds a philosophy about the resilience and creativity of the Bengkulu people. Making this cloth involves high hand skills and shows a close relationship between humans and the surrounding environment, because the main material of this cloth comes from local natural resources.

== Use of Lantung Cloth ==
During the Japanese occupation, Lantung cloth was used as a substitute for ordinary clothing due to limited materials. This cloth is often used for everyday clothing, but can also be used in various traditional ceremonies and rituals. Now, Lantung cloth is starting to be preserved again by the younger generation as part of Bengkulu's cultural identity.

== Preservation ==
After the colonial period, the use of Lantung cloth began to decline due to technological developments and increased availability of clothing materials from abroad. However, at the end of the 20th century, efforts to preserve this cloth began to develop. Several local arts and culture groups in Bengkulu actively held weaving training and introduced Lantung cloth to the public.

In addition, the local government has also begun to promote Lantung cloth as part of the region's cultural heritage. This effort aims to keep this traditional cloth appreciated and maintained, as well as an attraction for cultural tourism in Bengkulu.

== Cover ==
Lantung cloth is one of the important cultural heritages for the people of Bengkulu and Indonesia in general. This cloth not only has practical value, but is also a symbol of the resilience and creativity of the community in facing difficult times. As part of the regional cultural identity, the preservation of Lantung cloth is very important to maintain the sustainability of Indonesia's cultural heritage.
