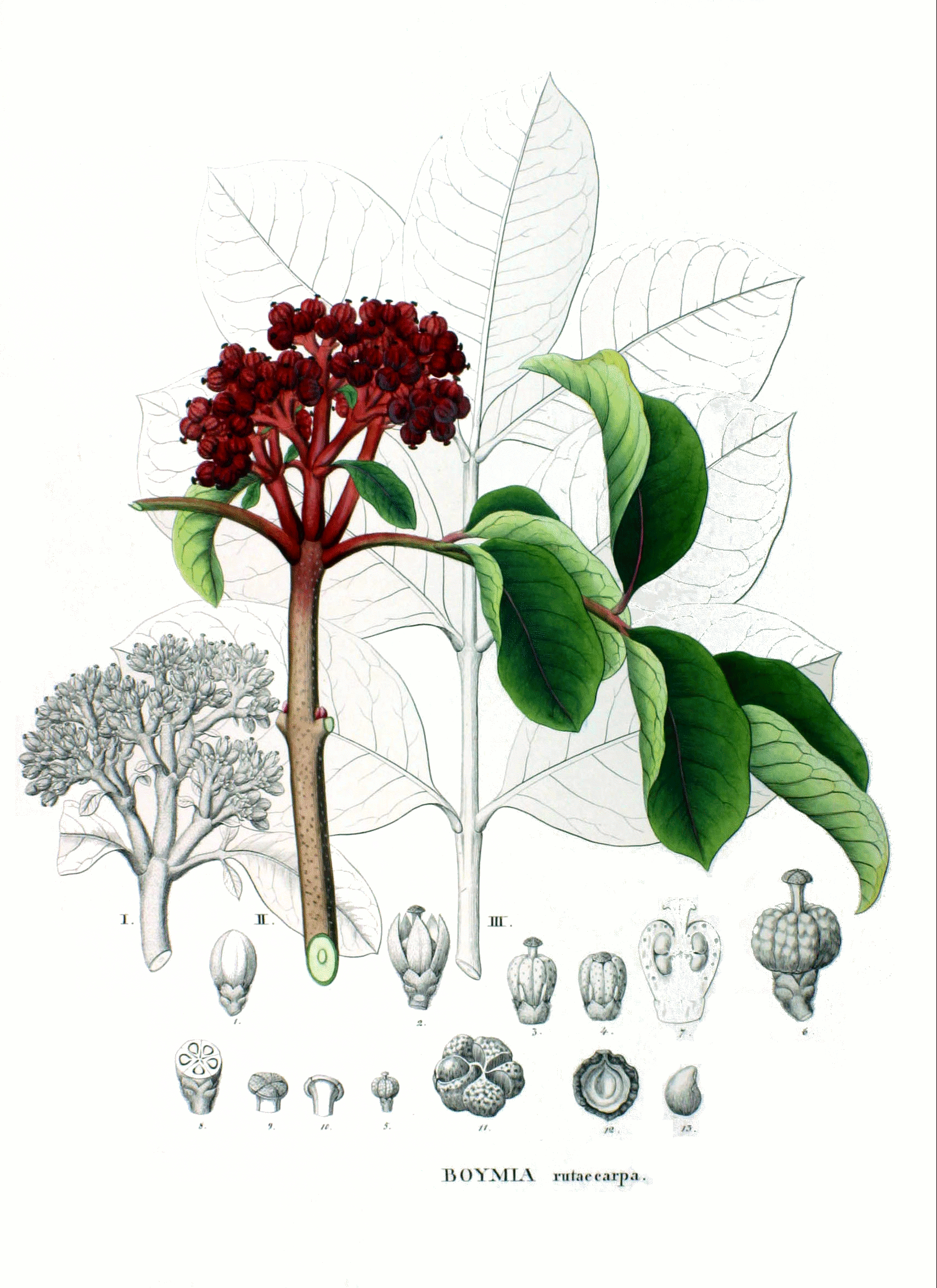

Scientific classification
- Kingdom: Plantae
- Clade: Embryophytes
- Clade: Tracheophytes
- Clade: Spermatophytes
- Clade: Angiosperms
- Clade: Eudicots
- Clade: Rosids
- Order: Sapindales
- Family: Rutaceae
- Genus: Tetradium
- Species: T. ruticarpum

Binomial name
- Tetradium ruticarpum (A.Juss.) T.G.Hartley

Synonyms
- Euodia ruticarpa (A. Juss.) Benth.; Evodia ruticarpa (A.Juss.) Hook.f. & Thomson

= Tetradium ruticarpum =

Species of tree

Regional names

Chinese name
- Chinese: 吴茱萸, 吳茱萸
- Hanyu Pinyin: wú zhū yú
Transcriptions
Standard Mandarin
- Hanyu Pinyin: wú zhū yú

Japanese name
- Kanji: 呉茱萸
- Kana: ごしゅゆ
Transcriptions
- Revised Hepburn: goshuyu

Tetradium ruticarpum is a tree that comes from China and Korea. It was previously classified in the genus Euodia as Euodia ruticarpa. The fruit is usually used, denoted sometimes as fructus. It has a strong bitter taste, and is used in traditional Chinese medicine (TCM) and is a recognized herb in Kampo. Both the former genus name and the species name are often misspelled, and the plant usually appears in sources dealing with traditional Chinese medicine as "Evodia(e) rutaecarpa".

== Production ==
=== Cultivation ===
Tetradium ruticarpum is grown mainly in China.

=== Harvesting ===
The fruit is picked. It may be consumed as food.

== Traditional medicine ==
=== Traditional Chinese medicine ===
In traditional Chinese medicine the herb is described as a fruit.

=== Kampo ===
Tetradium ruticarpum is called 呉茱萸 (Goshuyu) in Japanese, used in Goshuyu-tou and Unkentou (ja:温経湯). These are Kampo (漢方) preparations of mixed herbs, the former named after this plant. The mixture is noted for having a high concentration (132.6 to 706.3 mmol/100 g) of antioxidants, where the other constituents of the mixture rank lower.

== Contraindications ==
Allergic reactions have occasionally been reported in users of medicinal preparations of the plant.

== Biochemical analysis ==
There has been relatively little scientific study of Tetradium ruticarpum except for antioxidant capacity of one of its mixtures.

Notable compounds in T. ruticarpum include:

alkaloids:

- rutecarpine, an indole alkaloid that is a COX-2 inhibitor
- 0-hydroxyrutaecarpine
- evodiamine, a possible thermogenic agent and stimulant, named after the former name of the genus
- dehydroevodiamine
- synephrine, an adrenergic receptor agonist
- 1-methyl-2-n-nonyl-4(1H)quinolone
- evocarpine
- dihydroevocarpine

flavonoids:

- isorhamnetin-7-O-rutinoside
- diosmetin-7-O-β-d-glucopyranoside

In rats, the half-lives of most of these compounds was found to be relatively short, between 0.5 - 2 hours.

== Variants ==
There are a few variants:

- var. officinalis
- var bodinieri (Dode) Huang
