= Flannel weed =

Flannel weed is a common name for several plants and may refer to:

- Sida cordifolia
- Solanum mauritianum
- Verbascum thapsus
