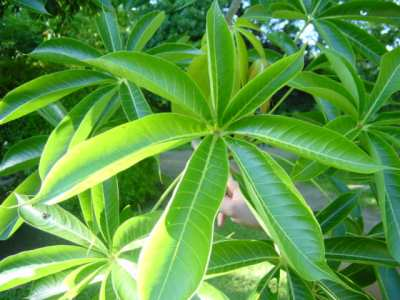

Scientific classification
- Kingdom: Plantae
- Clade: Tracheophytes
- Clade: Angiosperms
- Clade: Eudicots
- Clade: Rosids
- Order: Malvales
- Family: Malvaceae
- Genus: Sterculia
- Species: S. foetida

Binomial name
- Sterculia foetida L.

Synonyms
- Clompanus foetida (L.) Kuntze; Clompanus foetidus (L.) Kuntze; Sterculia mexicana var. guianensis Sagot

= Sterculia foetida =

Species of tree

Sterculia foetida is a soft-wooded tree that can grow up to 35 metres (115 feet) tall. Common names for the plant are the bastard poon tree, Java olive tree, hazel sterculia, wild almond tree, and skunk tree.

== Description ==
The branches of Sterculia foetida are arranged in whorls; they spread horizontally. The tree's bark is smooth and gray. The leaves are placed at the end of branchlets; they have petioles ranging from 12.5 and 23 centimetres (4.9 and 9.1 inches) in length; the blades are palmately compound, containing 7–9 leaflets. The leaflets are elliptical, 100–170 mm long, and shortly petioled. The petioles and also the flowers are the source of the foul smell of the plant. Plant explorer David G. Fairchild who personally sniffed many of the worst smelling flowers, was of the opinion that Sterculia foetida was the worst. The flowers are arranged in panicles, 10–15 cm (4–6 in) long. The green or purple flowers are large and unisexual as the tree is dioecious (male and female flowers are found on different trees). The pollens are oval in shape, approximately 40 microns in length. The calyx is dull orange and is divided into five sepals, each one 10–13 millimetres (3/8–1/2 in) long. The fruit consists of four to five follicles, each follicle generally containing 10–15 seeds. The follicles are scarlet when ripe. In India, flowers appear in March, and the leaves appear between March and April. At Hyderabad (India), flowering was observed in September–October (2015) with ripened fruits on the top part and young green fruits at the lower branches. The fruit is ripe in February (11 months after the flowers appeared).

== Taxonomy ==
The species was described in 1753 by Carl Linnaeus. It is the type species of the genus Sterculia and both names mean bad-smelling: the name Sterculia comes from Sterquilinus, the Roman god of fertilizer or manure.

== Distribution ==
Sterculia foetida is native to the following regions as defined in the World Geographical Scheme for Recording Plant Distributions:

- Indian Subcontinent – Assam, Bangladesh, India, Sri Lanka
- Indo-China – Cambodia, Laos, Myanmar, Thailand, Vietnam
- Malesia – Lesser Sunda Is., Malaya, Philippines, Sumatera

It has been introduced to:

- West-Central Tropical Africa – Gulf of Guinea Is.
- Western Indian Ocean – Comoros
- China – China Southeast, Hainan
- Indian Subcontinent – Pakistan
- Indo-China – Thailand
- Caribbean – Cuba, Jamaica, Leeward Is., Puerto Rico, Trinidad-Tobago, Windward Is.

== Toxicity and uses ==
The oil of Sterculia foetida has been found to be comparable to sunflower, soybean, and grapeseed oils for the use of biofuels. Sterculia foetida oil contains cyclopropene fatty acids (CPFA) such as 8,9 methylene-heptadec-8-enoic acid (malvalic acid) and 9,10-methylene-ocadec-9-enoic acid (sterculic acid). The flash point, iodine value, free fatty acid count, phosphorus content, cloud point, pour point, viscosity at 40 °C, oxidative stability at 110 °C, density, and trace metal count are all within ASTM and EN specifications.

Evidence suggests that the seeds are edible, but purgative, and should be roasted prior to eating. At least one review indicates that CPFA such as sterculic acid are carcinogenic, co-carcinogenic, and have medical and other effects on animals; according to this review, "CPFA in food is dangerous to human health".

In Vietnam, the tree is called Trôm and its sap is harvested to use as a soft drink called "Mủ Trôm".

== Gallery ==
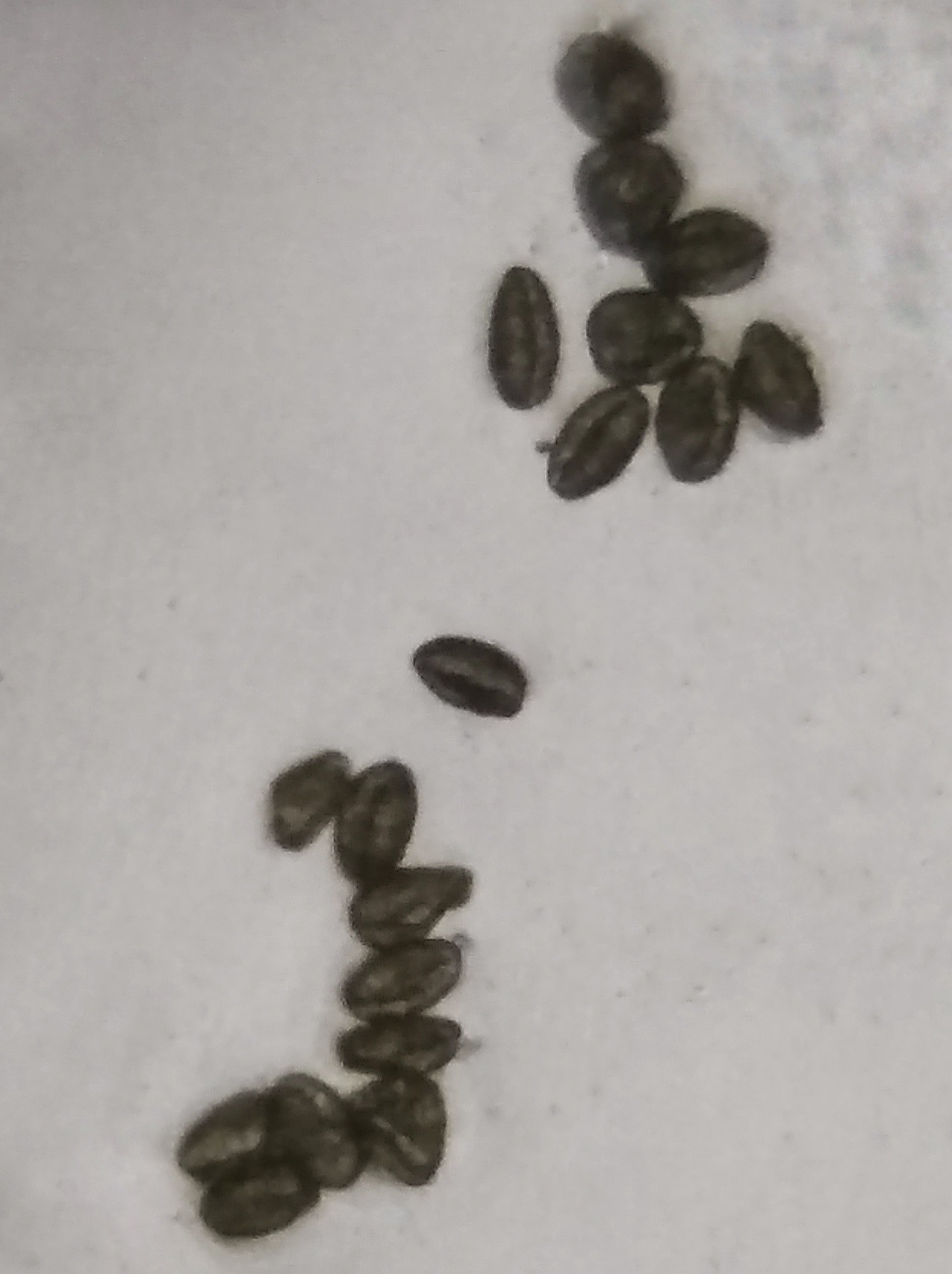
Pollen

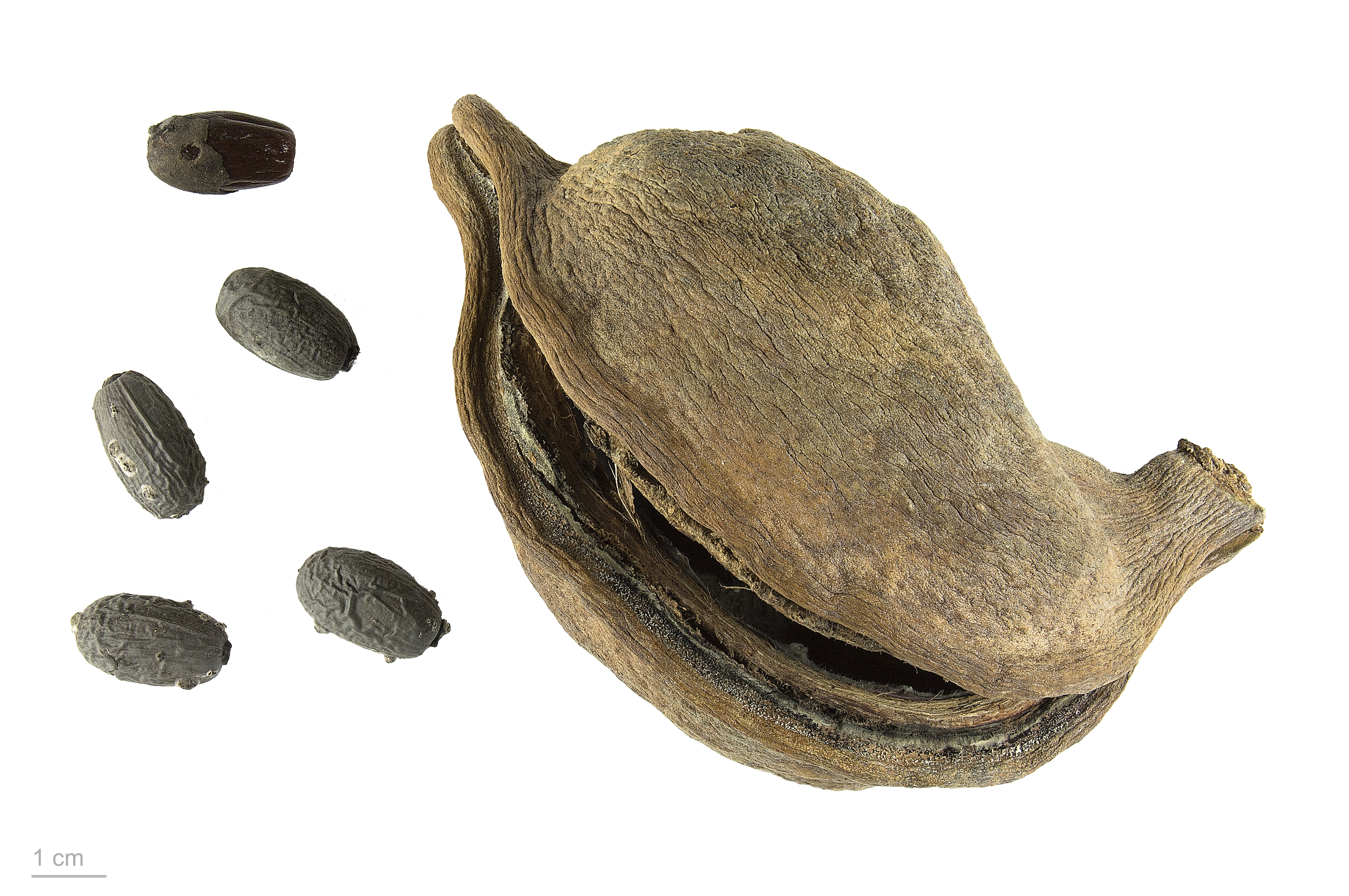
Follicle and seeds - MHNT

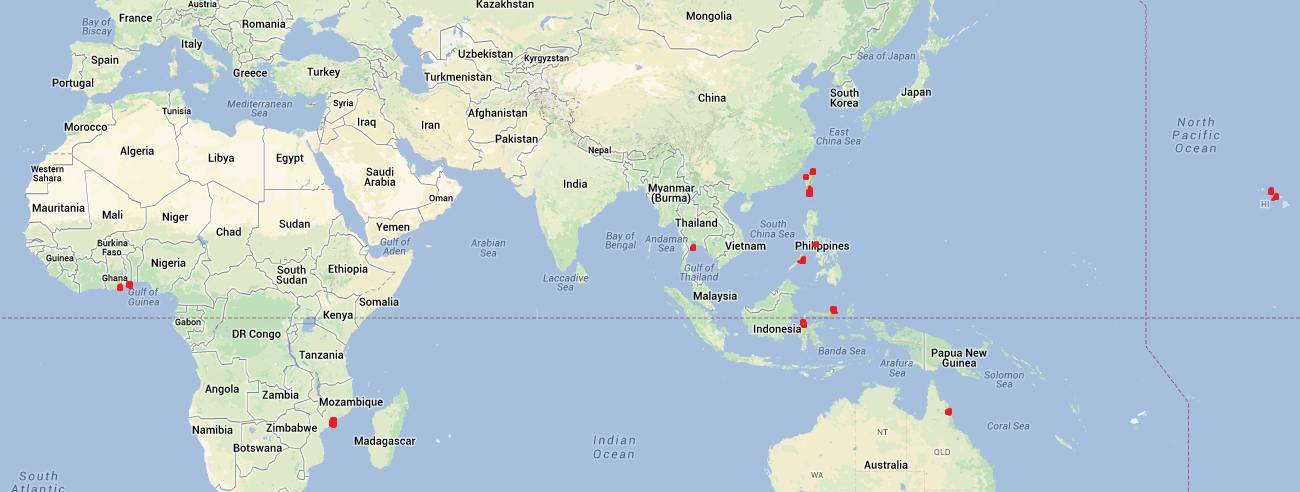
Points marked in red are known occurrences of Stercula foetida

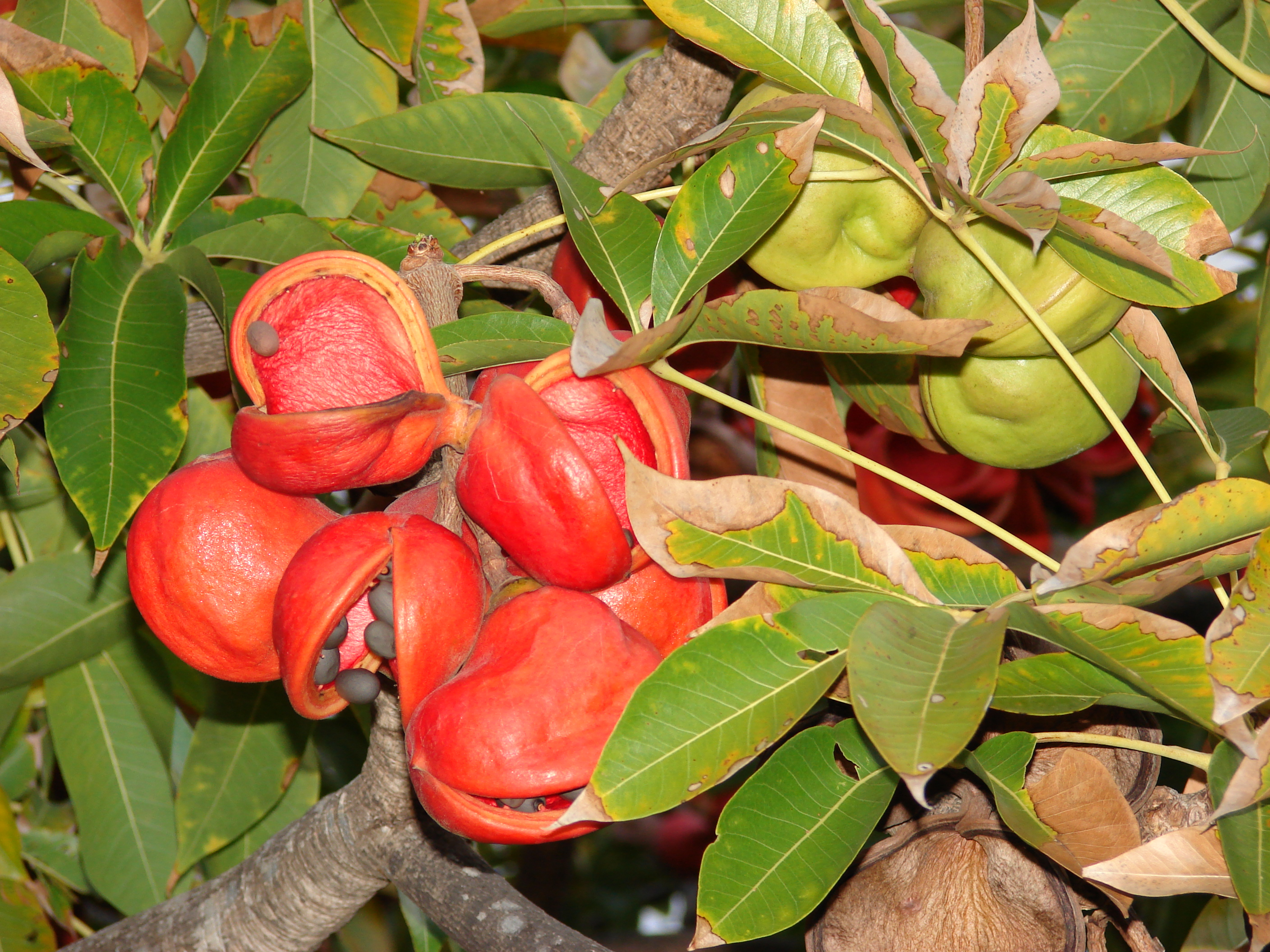
Fruit and leaves

leaves and tree

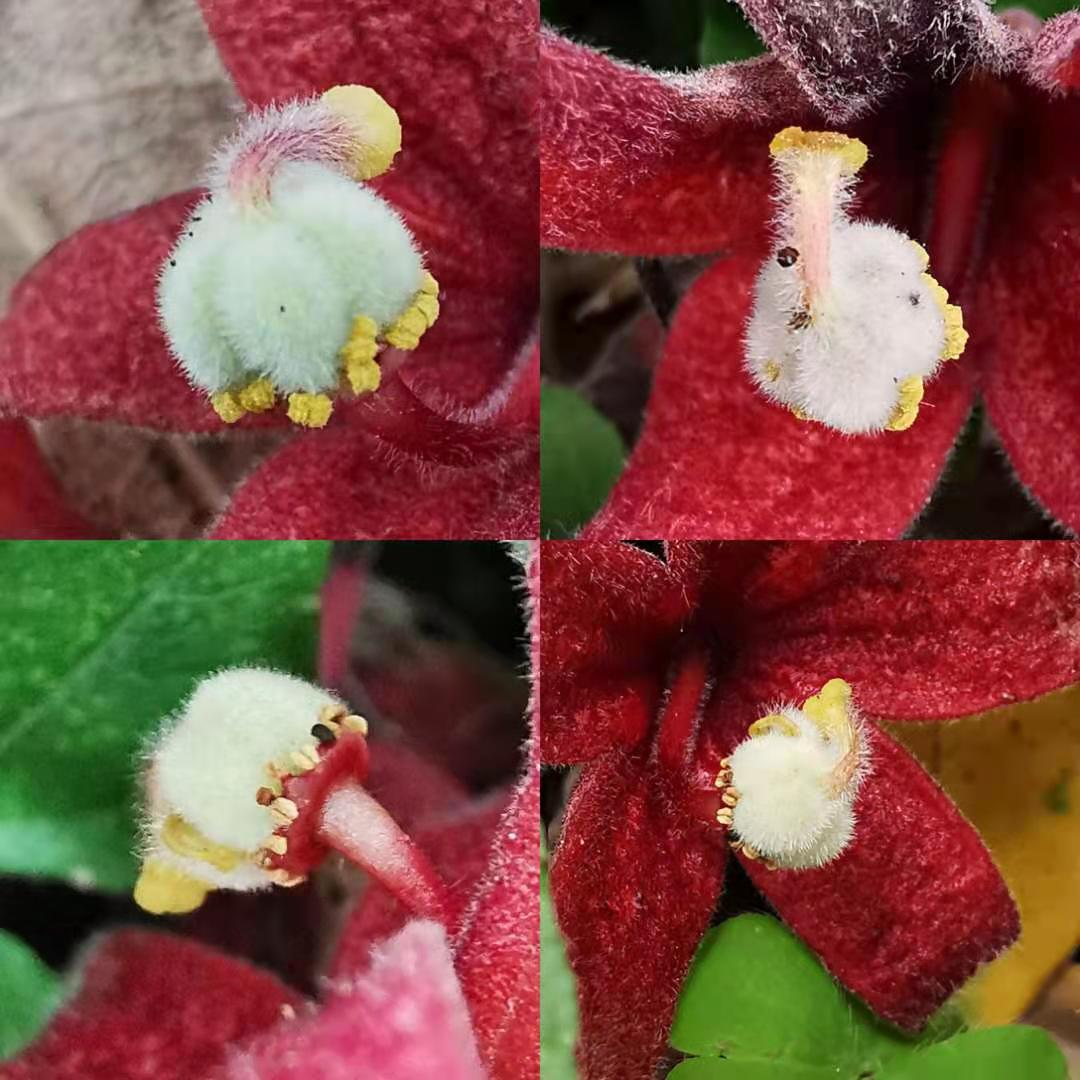
The flower in the lower part seems to have two styles.
