= Penestola simplicialis =

Scientific classification
- Kingdom: Animalia
- Phylum: Arthropoda
- Class: Insecta
- Order: Lepidoptera
- Family: Crambidae
- Genus: Penestola
- Species: P. simplicialis

Binomial name
- Penestola simplicialis (Barnes & McDunnough, 1913)

Synonyms
- Piletocera simplicialis Barnes & McDunnough, 1913

Species of moth

Penestola simplicialis is a moth in the family Crambidae. It was described by William Barnes and James Halliday McDunnough in 1913. It is found in Cuba and in the US state of Florida.
