= Cyclopropane fatty acid =

Examples of mycolic acids, a class of mono- and dicyclopropane fatty acids found in the cell wall of the bacterium Mycobacterium tuberculosis

Cyclopropane fatty acids (CPA) are a subgroup of fatty acids that contain a cyclopropane group.

== Occurrence ==
Although cyclopropane fatty acids are usually rare, the seed oil from lychee contains nearly 40% CPAs in the form of their triglycerides.

Olibanic acids are cyclopropane-containing undecylic acids that are implicated for their distinctive odor of frankincense.

== Biosynthesis ==
CPAs are derived from unsaturated fatty acids by cyclopropanation. The methylene donor is a methyl group on S-adenosylmethionine (SAM). The conversion is catalyzed by cyclopropane-fatty-acyl-phospholipid synthase. The mechanism is proposed to involve transfer of a CH^{+}_{3} group from SAM to the alkene, followed by deprotonation of the newly attached methyl group and ring closure.

== Cyclopropene fatty acids ==
Examples of mycolic acids, which can contain one or two cyclopropane rings

Cyclopropene fatty acids are even rarer molecules. The best-known examples of fatty acids containing cyclopropene rings are malvalic acid and sterculic acid. A triglyceride made of 3 sterculic acid molecules esterified with glycerol is present in Sterculia foetida seed oil (in amounts greater than 60%) and at low levels in the seed oil of other species of Malvaceae (Note: A number of species in several genera of the Malvaceae family are known as 'Kapok trees'. For example: Ceiba pentandra, Bombax ceiba and B. costatum are all widely and ambiguously called "the kapok tree".) (~12%), cottonseed oil (~1%). The cyclopropene ring is destroyed during refining and hydrogenation of the oils. They have attracted interest because they reduce levels of the enzyme stearoyl-CoA 9-desaturase (SCD), which catalyzes the biodesaturation of stearic acid to oleic acid.
