= Olibanic acid =

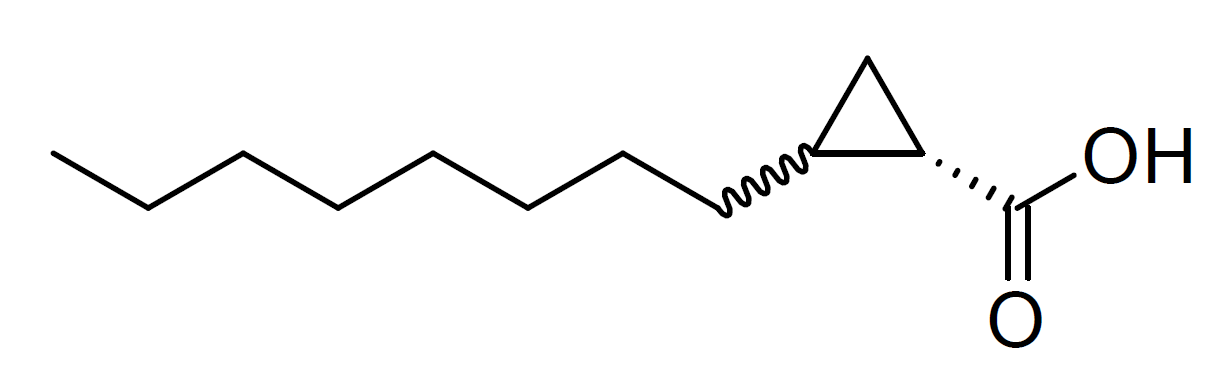

Names
- IUPAC name 2-octylcyclopropane-1-carboxylic acid

Identifiers
CAS Number	15898-87-0
3D model (JSmol)	Interactive image; (+)-trans: Interactive image; (−)-trans: Interactive image; (+)-cis: Interactive image; (−)-cis: Interactive image
ChemSpider	2501294
PubChem CID	(+)-trans: 1713016; (−)-trans: 1713014; (+)-cis: 1713018; (−)-cis: 1713012
CompTox Dashboard (EPA)	DTXSID60390651
- InChI: InChI=1S/C12H22O2/c1-2-3-4-5-6-7-8-10-9-11(10)12(13)14/h10-11H,2-9H2,1H3,(H,13,14) Key: FLZRNGWKTVAXBN-UHFFFAOYSA-N; (+)-trans: InChI=1S/C12H22O2/c1-2-3-4-5-6-7-8-10-9-11(10)12(13)14/h10-11H,2-9H2,1H3,(H,13,14)/t10-,11-/m0/s1 Key: FLZRNGWKTVAXBN-QWRGUYRKSA-N; (−)-trans: InChI=1S/C12H22O2/c1-2-3-4-5-6-7-8-10-9-11(10)12(13)14/h10-11H,2-9H2,1H3,(H,13,14)/t10-,11-/m1/s1 Key: FLZRNGWKTVAXBN-GHMZBOCLSA-N; (+)-cis: InChI=1S/C12H22O2/c1-2-3-4-5-6-7-8-10-9-11(10)12(13)14/h10-11H,2-9H2,1H3,(H,13,14)/t10-,11+/m1/s1 Key: FLZRNGWKTVAXBN-MNOVXSKESA-N; (−)-cis: InChI=1S/C12H22O2/c1-2-3-4-5-6-7-8-10-9-11(10)12(13)14/h10-11H,2-9H2,1H3,(H,13,14)/t10-,11+/m0/s1 Key: FLZRNGWKTVAXBN-WDEREUQCSA-N
- SMILES: CCCCCCCCC1CC1C(=O)O; (+)-trans: CCCCCCCC[C@H]1C[C@@H]1C(=O)O; (−)-trans: CCCCCCCC[C@@H]1C[C@H]1C(=O)O; (+)-cis: CCCCCCCC[C@@H]1C[C@@H]1C(=O)O; (−)-cis: CCCCCCCC[C@H]1C[C@H]1C(=O)O

Properties
Chemical formula	C_{12}H_{22}O_{2}
Molar mass	198.306 g·mol^{−1}
- Except where otherwise noted, data are given for materials in their standard state (at 25 °C [77 °F], 100 kPa). Infobox references

Olibanic acid is a pair of organic compounds with the formula CH_{3}(CH_{2})_{7}(C_{3}H_{4})CO_{2}H. These are cyclopropane fatty acids. Although present at lower concentrations than other components, they have a highly potent odor and are thought to contribute the distinctive smell of frankincense. The (1S,2S)-(+)-trans and (1S,2R)-(+)-cis diastereomers have similar but nonidentical "old church"-like odors. Because of the cyclopropane ring, these compounds are conformationally constrained analogues of 2-methylundecanoic acid, a fragrance marketed under the name Mystikal.
