= Penestola bufalis =

Scientific classification
- Kingdom: Animalia
- Phylum: Arthropoda
- Class: Insecta
- Order: Lepidoptera
- Family: Crambidae
- Genus: Penestola
- Species: P. bufalis

Binomial name
- Penestola bufalis (Guenée, 1854)

Synonyms
- Stenia bufalis Guenée, 1854; Botys plebeialis Walker, 1866; Penestola praeficalis Möschler, 1890

Species of moth

Penestola bufalis, the black penestola moth, is a moth in the family Crambidae. It was described by Achille Guenée in 1854. It is found in the US states of Texas and Florida, as well as on the Antilles (Cuba, Jamaica, Puerto Rico). It is an accidentally introduced species on the Galápagos Islands. The habitat consists of coastal mangrove swamps and shorelines.
