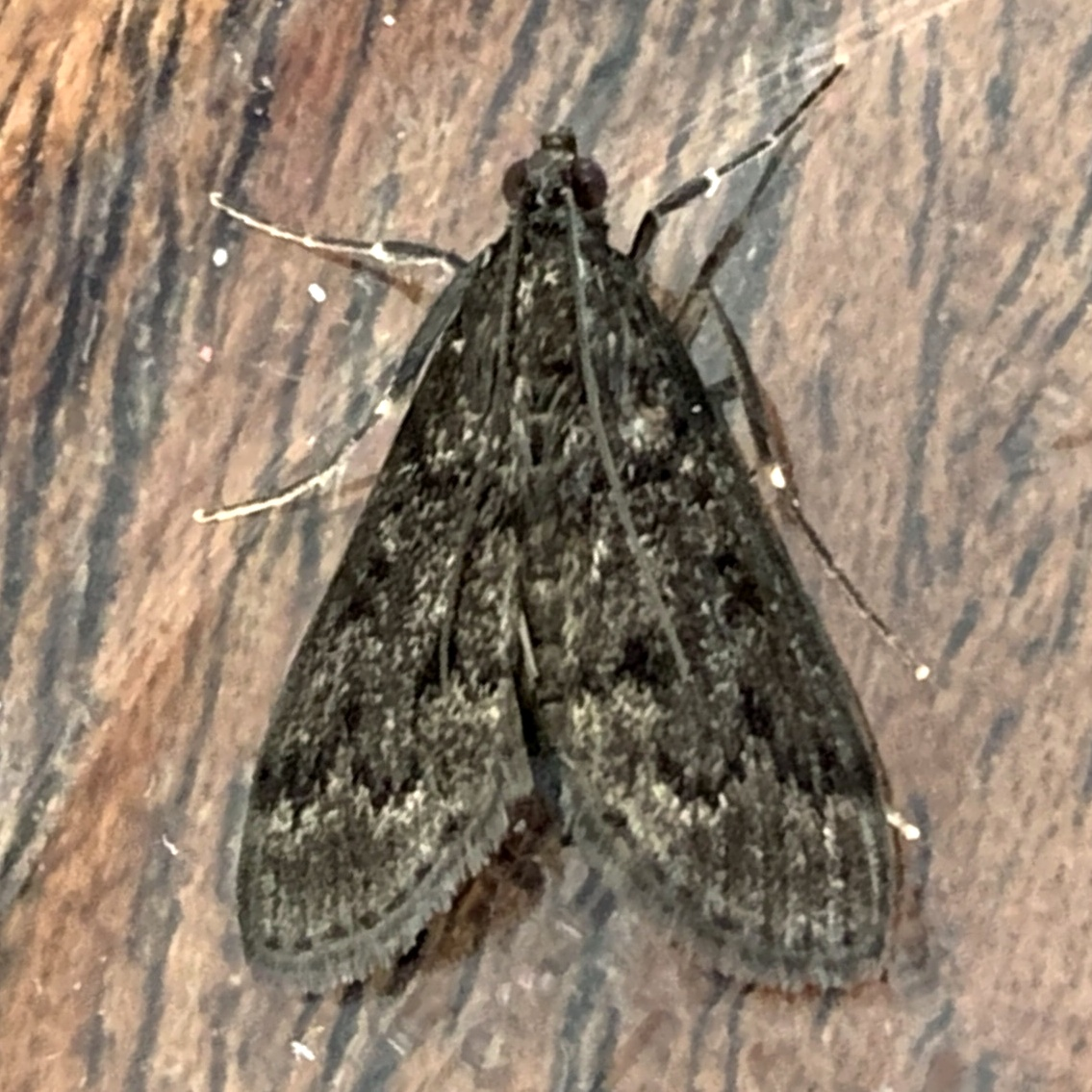

Scientific classification
- Kingdom: Animalia
- Phylum: Arthropoda
- Class: Insecta
- Order: Lepidoptera
- Family: Crambidae
- Subfamily: Spilomelinae
- Genus: Penestola; Möschler, 1890

= Penestola =

Genus of moths

Penestola is a genus of moths in the family Crambidae. The genus was described by Heinrich Benno Möschler in 1890.

== Species ==
- Penestola bufalis (Guenée, 1854)
- Penestola simplicialis (Barnes & McDunnough, 1913)
- Penestola stercoralis (Möschler, 1881)
