= Vasicine =

Names
- IUPAC name (3S)-1,2,3,9-Tetrahydropyrrolo[2,1-b]quinazolin-3-ol
- Other names Peganine; (-)-vasicine

Identifiers
CAS Number	6159-55-3; (±): 6159-56-4
3D model (JSmol)	Interactive image
ChEBI	CHEBI:181180
ChEMBL	ChEMBL1186527
ChemSpider	65485
KEGG	C10733
PubChem CID	667496
UNII	6C2ZBI733P
CompTox Dashboard (EPA)	DTXSID701317988
- InChI: InChI=1S/C11H12N2O/c14-10-5-6-13-7-8-3-1-2-4-9(8)12-11(10)13/h1-4,10,14H,5-7H2 Key: YIICVSCAKJMMDJ-UHFFFAOYSA-N
- SMILES: O[C@@H]1C=2N(CC=3C(N2)=CC=CC3)CC1

Properties
Chemical formula	C_{11}H_{12}N_{2}O
Molar mass	188.230 g·mol^{−1}
Melting point	210 °C (410 °F; 483 K)
Solubility in acetone, alcohol, chloroform	Soluble
- Except where otherwise noted, data are given for materials in their standard state (at 25 °C [77 °F], 100 kPa). Infobox references

Vasicine (peganine) is a quinazoline alkaloid. It is found in Justicia adhatoda, after which it is named. It is additionally found in Peganum harmala.

Vasicine has been compared to theophylline both in vitro and in vivo. It has also been studied in combination with the related alkaloid vasicinone. Both the alkaloids in combination (1:1) showed pronounced bronchodilatory activity in vivo and in vitro. Both alkaloids are also respiratory stimulants. Vasicine has a cardiac–depressant effect, while vasicinone is a weak cardiac stimulant; the effect can be normalized by combining the alkaloids. Vasicine is reported to have a uterine stimulant effect.
