= Methylene-fatty-acyl-phospholipid synthase =

methylene-fatty-acyl-phospholipid synthase

Identifiers
- EC no.: 2.1.1.16
- CAS no.: 37256-90-9

Databases
- IntEnz: IntEnz view
- BRENDA: BRENDA entry
- ExPASy: NiceZyme view
- KEGG: KEGG entry
- MetaCyc: metabolic pathway
- PRIAM: profile
- PDB structures: RCSB PDB PDBe PDBsum
- Gene Ontology: AmiGO / QuickGO
Search
- PMC: articles
- PubMed: articles
- NCBI: proteins

In enzymology, a methylene-fatty-acyl-phospholipid synthase (EC 2.1.1.16) is an enzyme that catalyzes the chemical reaction

S-adenosyl-L-methionine + phospholipid olefinic fatty acid $\rightleftharpoons$ S-adenosyl-L-homocysteine + phospholipid methylene fatty acid

Thus, the two substrates of this enzyme are S-adenosyl methionine and phospholipid olefinic fatty acid, whereas its two products are S-adenosylhomocysteine and phospholipid methylene fatty acid.

This enzyme belongs to the family of transferases, specifically those transferring one-carbon group methyltransferases. The systematic name of this enzyme class is S-adenosyl-L-methionine:unsaturated-phospholipid methyltransferase (methenylating). This enzyme is also called unsaturated-phospholipid methyltransferase.
