= Penestola stercoralis =

Scientific classification
- Kingdom: Animalia
- Phylum: Arthropoda
- Class: Insecta
- Order: Lepidoptera
- Family: Crambidae
- Genus: Penestola
- Species: P. stercoralis

Binomial name
- Penestola stercoralis (Möschler, 1881)

Synonyms
- Botis stercoralis Möschler, 1881

Species of moth

Penestola stercoralis is a moth in the family Crambidae. It was described by Heinrich Benno Möschler in 1881. It is found in Suriname.
