= Rutecarpine =

COX-2 inhibitor compound

Names
- Preferred IUPAC name 8,13-Hydroindolo[2′,3′:3,4]pyrido[2,1-b]quinazolin-5(7H)-one

Identifiers
CAS Number	84-26-4
3D model (JSmol)	Interactive image
ChEBI	CHEBI:8922
ChEMBL	ChEMBL85139
ChemSpider	59175
ECHA InfoCard	100.163.752
EC Number	635-907-6
KEGG	C09238
PubChem CID	65752
UNII	8XZV289PRY
CompTox Dashboard (EPA)	DTXSID00232884
- InChI: InChI=1S/C18H13N3O/c22-18-13-6-2-4-8-15(13)20-17-16-12(9-10-21(17)18)11-5-1-3-7-14(11)19-16/h1-8,19H,9-10H2 Key: ACVGWSKVRYFWRP-UHFFFAOYSA-N; InChI=1/C18H13N3O/c22-18-13-6-2-4-8-15(13)20-17-16-12(9-10-21(17)18)11-5-1-3-7-14(11)19-16/h1-8,19H,9-10H2 Key: ACVGWSKVRYFWRP-UHFFFAOYAZ
- SMILES: C1CN2C(=NC3=CC=CC=C3C2=O)C4=C1C5=CC=CC=C5N4

Properties
Chemical formula	C_{18}H_{13}N_{3}O
Molar mass	287.322 g·mol^{−1}
- Except where otherwise noted, data are given for materials in their standard state (at 25 °C [77 °F], 100 kPa). Infobox references

Rutecarpine or rutaecarpine is a COX-2 inhibitor isolated from Tetradium ruticarpum, a tree native to China. It is classified as a non-basic alkaloid.

In contrast to synthetic COX-2 inhibitors like etoricoxib and celecoxib, rutecarpine does not appear to cause negative effects on the cardiovascular system.

== Metabolism ==
Microsome studies suggest that rutaecarpine may be at least a weak inhibitor of CYP1A2, CYP2C9, CYP2C19, CYP2E1, and CYP3A4 enzymes. At the same time, it is believed to be a strong inducer of CYP1A2 and CYP1A1.

Rutecarpine metabolism is complex and proceeds along several routes, primarily involving the addition of a single hydroxyl group by CYP3A4. Six monohydroxylated and four dihydroxylated metabolites have been identified. To a much lesser extent, rutecarpine may be metabolized by CYP2C9 and CYP1A2, according to liver microsome studies.

== Supplementation ==
Rutecarpine has been shown to decrease the overall bioavailability of caffeine in rats by up to 80 percent, likely through induction of enzymes CYP1A2 and CYP2E1.
