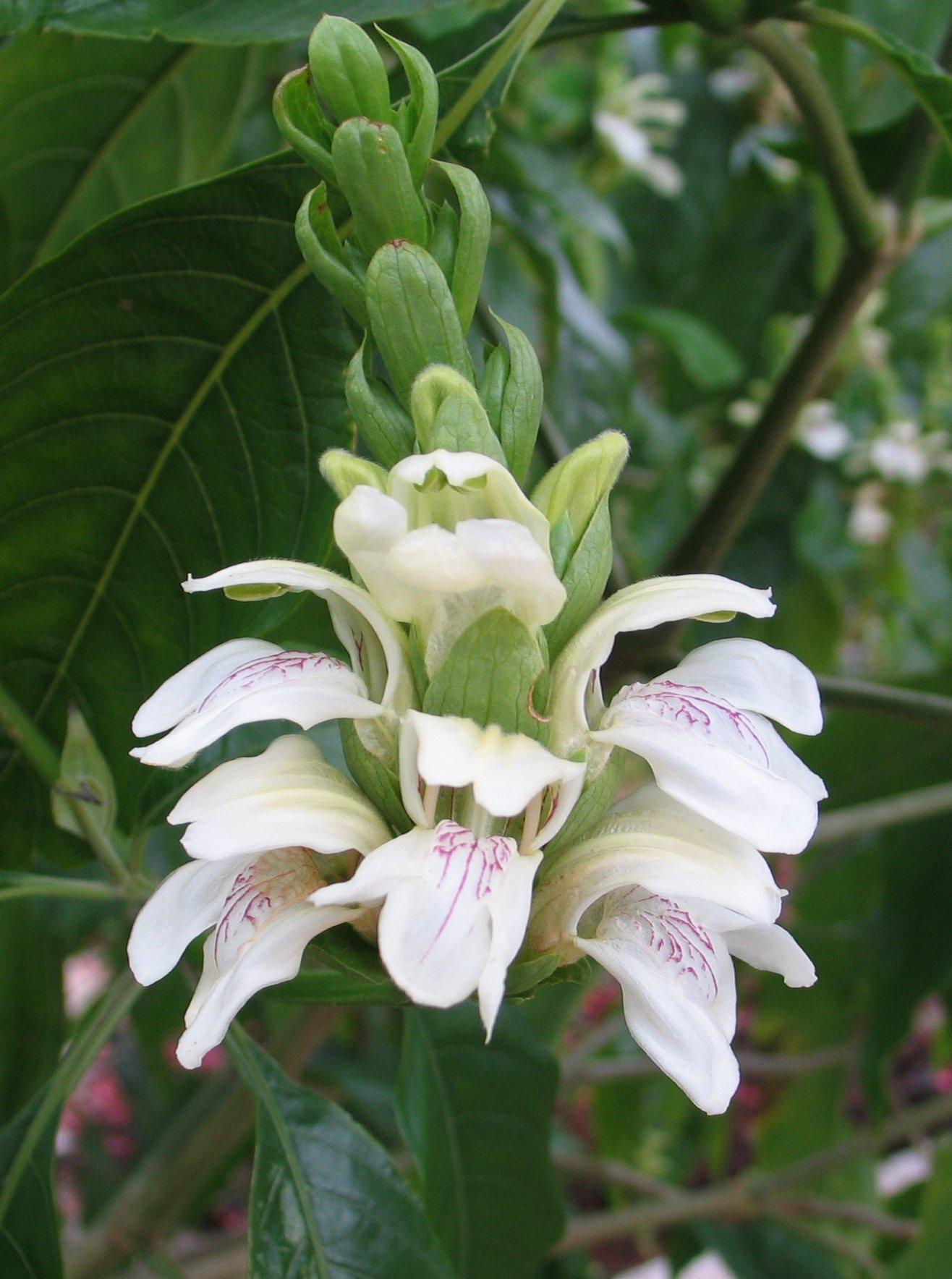

Conservation status
- Least Concern (IUCN 3.1)

Scientific classification
- Kingdom: Plantae
- Clade: Tracheophytes
- Clade: Angiosperms
- Clade: Eudicots
- Clade: Asterids
- Order: Lamiales
- Family: Acanthaceae
- Genus: Justicia
- Species: J. adhatoda

Binomial name
- Justicia adhatoda L.

Synonyms
- Adeloda serrata Raf.; Adhatoda pubescens Moench; Adhatoda vasica Nees; Adhatoda zeylanica Medik.; Dianthera latifolia Salisb.; Ecbolium adhatoda (L.) Kuntze; Gendarussa adhadota (L.) Steud.

= Justicia adhatoda =

Species of flowering plant

Justicia adhatoda commonly known in English as Malabar nut, adulsa, adhatoda, vasa, vasaka, is native to Asia. Adathoda means 'untouched by goats' in Tamil. The name derives from the fact that animals like goats do not eat this plant due to its extreme bitter taste.

The plant's native range is Afghanistan, the Indian subcontinent (Bangladesh, India, Pakistan, Nepal and Sri Lanka), Laos, Myanmar and Vietnam. It has been introduced elsewhere.

It is used as a traditional medicinal plant.

== Description ==
Justicia adhatoda is a shrub with 10-20 lance-shaped leaves 8-9 centimeters in length by four wide. They are oppositely arranged, smooth-edged, and borne on short petioles. When dry they are of a dull brownish-green colour. They are bitter-tasting. When a leaf is cleared with chloral hydrate and examined microscopically the oval stomata can be seen. They are surrounded by two crescent-shaped cells at right angles to the ostiole. The epidermis bears simple one- to three-celled warty hairs, and small glandular hairs. Cystoliths occur beneath the epidermis of the underside of the blade.

The trunk has many long opposite ascending branches, where the bark is yellowish in color. Flowers are usually white and the inflorescence shows large, dense, axillary spikes. Fruits are pubescent, and are with club-shaped capsules.

== Chemical composition ==
The leaves of Justicia adhatoda contains phytochemicals such as alkaloids, tannins, saponins, phenolics and flavonoids. The most important is vasicine, a quinazoline alkaloid. The vasicine yield of the herbage has been measured as 0.541 to 1.1% by dry weight. Bromhexine, a serine protease inhibitor with mucolytic properties available over-the-counter in Europe, was developed from research on Justicia adhatoda.
