= Crepitus (mythology) =

Supposed Roman god of flatulence

Crepitus is an unattested deity, supposedly a Roman god that apparently was created by Christians and used in satire. It is unlikely that any worship of Crepitus existed. The only ancient source for a claim for such a deity is considered dubious as well, nonetheless, it is referred to in Christian satire as a "god of flatulence" and the claim for a deity for intestinal noise (crepitus ventris) appears in a number of important works of French literature. Medical jargon gives the name crepitus to the creaking or popping noises made by the joints. The Latin word for "to fart" is pēdere, which does not appear in the sources. The sources contain the Latin noun crepitus (noise) that appears in the fourth Latin declension and its genitive case would be crepitūs as well.

== Sources of references ==
No ancient polytheistic source appears for this deity. As it is possible that the existence of this deity is an invention by a satirist, the origin of the concept is somewhat obscure. The earliest mention of such a deity is as an Egyptian deity, not a Roman one. This earliest known mention related to intestinal noise comes from a hostile source, the author of the Recognitions that was attributed dubiously to Pope Clement I. In that source it is reported that:

alii ... crepitus ventris pro numinibus habendos esse docuerunt.

"others (among the Egyptians) teach that intestinal noise (Latin: crepitus ventris) ought to be regarded as a god."

It is unlikely that Clement I was the author of the extant Recognitiones. They are extant chiefly in a Latin translation (presumably from a Greek original source) made by Tyrannius Rufinus in the late fourth or early fifth century. The passage by the pseudo-Clement stands within a Western tradition of Christian satire against the variety of minor deities worshiped by classical pagans. Similar passages exist in The City of God by Saint Augustine of Hippo and in Ad Nationes by Tertullian.

In his work entitled The Anatomy of Melancholy (1621), Robert Burton mentions Crepitus Ventris among a variety of other deities supposedly worshiped in classical antiquity:)

Lilius Giraldus repeats many of her ceremonies: all affections of the mind were heretofore accounted gods, love, and sorrow, virtue, honour, liberty, contumely, impudency, had their temples, tempests, seasons, Crepitus Ventris, dea Vacuna, dea Cloacina, there was a goddess of idleness, a goddess of the draught, or jakes, Prema, Premunda, Priapus, bawdy gods, and gods for all offices.

Burton cites a work entitled Syntagma de Diis ("A Compendium of the Gods") by Lilius Giraldus as his source for the existence of such a god. By this reference, Burton probably meant the Historia de diis gentium ("History of the Pagan Gods") by Giraldus; but because Burton wrote in what he called an "extemporean" style, quicquid in buccam venit ("whatever came into his head"), Burton's quotations and references often are not reliable. Because of Burton's mixed Latin and English style, this passage may not even state that there was a god named "Crepitus Ventris", (Latin for "intestinal noise"), but only that there was a deity for intestinal noise, crepitus ventris. The Latin word crepitus, moreover, did not exclusively mean the sound generated by intestinal gas; it referred to squeaks, groans, knocks, and any nondescript noise in general. In The City of God, Augustine elsewhere refers to crepitus cymbalorum, the clang of cymbals.

=== In Voltaire ===
Voltaire, in a passage of his Philosophical Dictionary devoted to the changing conceptions of deity, alludes to a number of real or supposed Roman deities of a less exalted status:

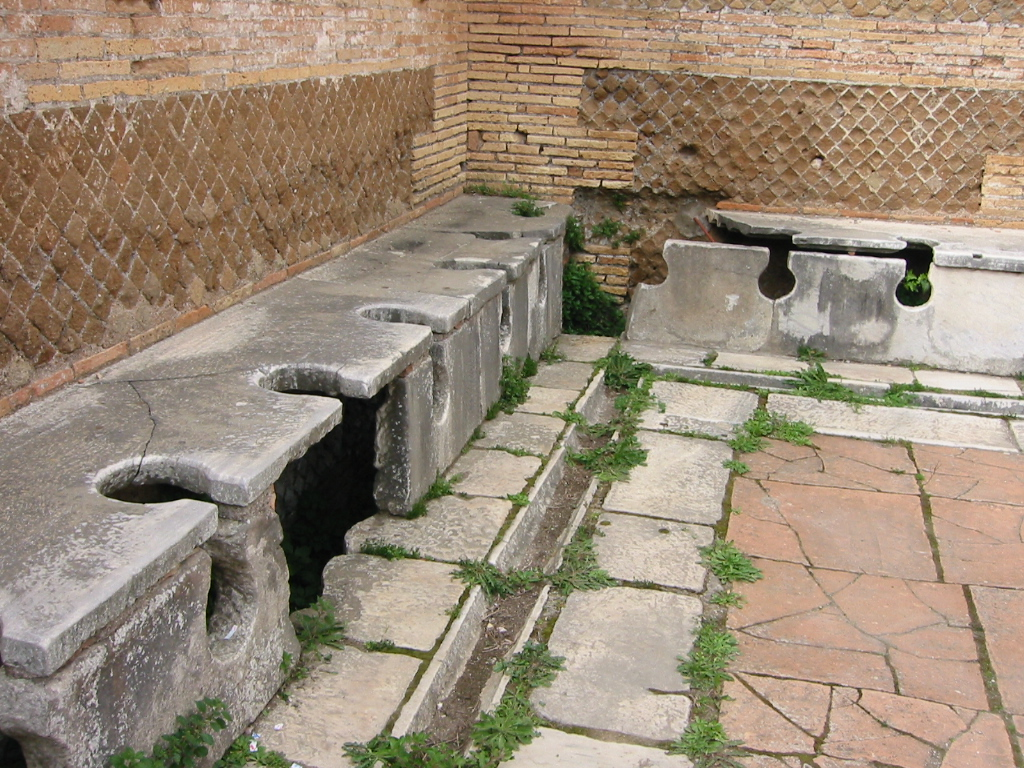
Ancient Roman public toilet - Ostia

La déesse des tétons, dea Rumilia; la déesse de l’action du mariage, dea Pertunda; le dieu de la chaise percée, deus Stercutius; le dieu Pet, deus Crepitus, ne sont pas assurément bien vénérables. . . Il est sûr que deus Crepitus, le dieu Pet, ne donnait pas la même idée que deus divum et hominum sator, la source des dieux et des hommes.

"The goddess of breasts, dea Rumilia; the goddess of the marital act, dea Pertunda; the god of the toilet, deus Stercutius; the god Fart, deus Crepitus, were surely not quite objects of reverence... It is certain that deus Crepitus, the god Fart, did not give the same sort of idea as deus divum et hominum sator, the creator of gods and men."
— "Polytheism", entry in the Philosophical Dictionary of Voltaire.

Through these passages, the noun crepitus transitions from a common noun to Crepitus as a proper noun. Previous authorities had only claimed that the ancient polytheists, whether Egyptian or Roman, worshiped a deity of intestinal noises. Perhaps in Burton's mention, but certainly in that of Voltaire, Crepitus is the name of a god.

=== In Baudelaire ===
Baudelaire criticised both the need for religion and the mediocrity of neopagan artists in the essay "The Pagan School" ("L'École païenne"):

Pastiche ! pastiche ! Vous avez sans doute perdu votre âme quelque part, dans quelque mauvais endroit, pour que vous couriez ainsi à travers le passé comme des corps vides pour en ramasser une de rencontre dans les détritus anciens ? Qu'attendez-vous du ciel ou de la sottise du public ? Une fortune suffisante pour élever dans vos mansardes des autels à Priape et à Bacchus ? Les plus logiques d'entre vous seront les plus cyniques. Ils en élèveront au dieu Crepitus.

"Pastiche! pastiche! You must have all surely lost your soul somewhere, in some bad place, to be thus running now through the past as emptied carcasses, trying to pick one up from the ancient detritus on stumbling on it by haphazard. Have you not? What are you expecting of the heavens or the folly of the public? Could it be a fortune swollen enough to raise altars to Priapus and Bacchus upon your mansard roofs? The most sane amongst you shall be those most cynical: they shall raise it in honour of the god Crepitus."

=== In Flaubert ===
Relying on Voltaire's account, Gustave Flaubert put a memorable speech into the mouth of the supposed deity Crepitus in The Temptation of Saint Anthony:

CREPITUS: Moi aussi l'on m'honora jadis. On me faisait des libations. Je fus un Dieu!
L'Athénien me saluait comme un présage de fortune, tandis que le Romain dévot me maudissait les poings levés et que le pontife d'Égypte, s'abstenant de fèves, tremblait à ma voix et pâlissait à mon odeur.
Quand le vinaigre militaire coulait sur les barbes non rasées, qu'on se régalait de glands, de pois et d'oignons crus et que le bouc en morceaux cuisait dans le beurre rance des pasteurs, sans souci du voisin, personne alors ne se gênait. Les nourritures solides faisaient les digestions retentissantes. Au soleil de la campagne, les hommes se soulageaient avec lenteur.
J'ai eu mes jours d'orgueil. Le bon Aristophane me promena sur la scène, et l'empereur Claudius Drusus me fit asseoir à sa table. Dans les laticlaves des patriciens j'ai circulé majestueusement! Les vases d'or, comme des tympanons, résonnaient sous moi;--et quand plein de murènes, de truffes et de pâtés, l'intestin du maître se dégageait avec fracas, l'univers attentif apprenait que César avait dîné!

"I once was honoured. Libations were made to me. I was a God!
"The Athenian once hailed me as a favourable omen, while the pious Roman cursed me with raised fists, and the pontiff of Egypt, abstinent from beans, trembled at my voice and paled at my odour...
"When the army vinegar ran down unshaven beards, when men helped themselves to acorns, peas, and raw onions, and cooked chopped up goat meat in shepherds' rank butter — never mind your neighbour — no one was embarrassed by me. Solid foods made for sound digestions. In the sun of the countryside, men took their ease at their leisure...
"I had my glory days. Jolly Aristophanes placed me on the stage, and the emperor Claudius Drusus had me sitting at his table. I made the rounds majestically in the laticlaves of patricians! The golden vessels resounded under me like kettledrums — and when stuffed with lamprey, truffles, and pâtés, the intestine of the Master noisily emptied itself, an attentive universe learned that Caesar had dined!"

== Modern invention ==
While Flaubert learned from his friend Fréderic Baudry, who in turn, had consulted Alfred Maury, that "poor little Deus Crepitus does not exist; it's a modern invention", he liked his text so much that he left him in.

While it is unproven that Crepitus ever existed as a Roman deity, the scene from the Greek play by Aristophanes is genuine and in his work The Clouds the Athenians compare thunder to the sound of celestial flatulence.
