= Sterculic acid =

Names
- Preferred IUPAC name 8-(2-Octylcycloprop-1-en-1-yl)octanoic acid

Identifiers
CAS Number	738-87-4
3D model (JSmol)	Interactive image
Beilstein Reference	1880442
ChEBI	CHEBI:9261
ChEMBL	ChEMBL3677268
ChemSpider	12386
KEGG	C08366
PubChem CID	12921
UNII	MXV06G5ROK
CompTox Dashboard (EPA)	DTXSID90970445
- InChI: InChI=1S/C19H34O2/c1-2-3-4-5-7-10-13-17-16-18(17)14-11-8-6-9-12-15-19(20)21/h2-16H2,1H3,(H,20,21) Key: PQRKPYLNZGDCFH-UHFFFAOYSA-N
- SMILES: CCCCCCCCC1=C(C1)CCCCCCCC(=O)O

Properties
Chemical formula	C_{19}H_{34}O_{2}
Molar mass	294.479 g·mol^{−1}
- Except where otherwise noted, data are given for materials in their standard state (at 25 °C [77 °F], 100 kPa). verify (what is ?) Infobox references

Sterculic acid is a cyclopropene fatty acid. It is found in various plants of the genus Sterculia, including being the main component of Sterculia foetida seed oil.

== Biosynthesis ==
The biosynthesis of sterculic acid begins with the cyclopropanation of the alkene of phospholipid-bound oleic acid, an 18-carbon cis-monounsaturated fatty acid. This transformation involves two mechanistic steps: electrophilic methylation with S-adenosyl methionine to give a carbocationic reactive intermediate, followed by cyclization via loss of H^{+} mediated by a cyclopropane-fatty-acyl-phospholipid synthase enzyme. The product, dihydrosterculic acid, is converted to sterculic acid by dehydrogenation of the cis-disubstituted cyclopropane to cyclopropene. An additional step of α oxidation removes one carbon from the carboxy chain to form the 17-carbon-chain structure of malvalic acid.

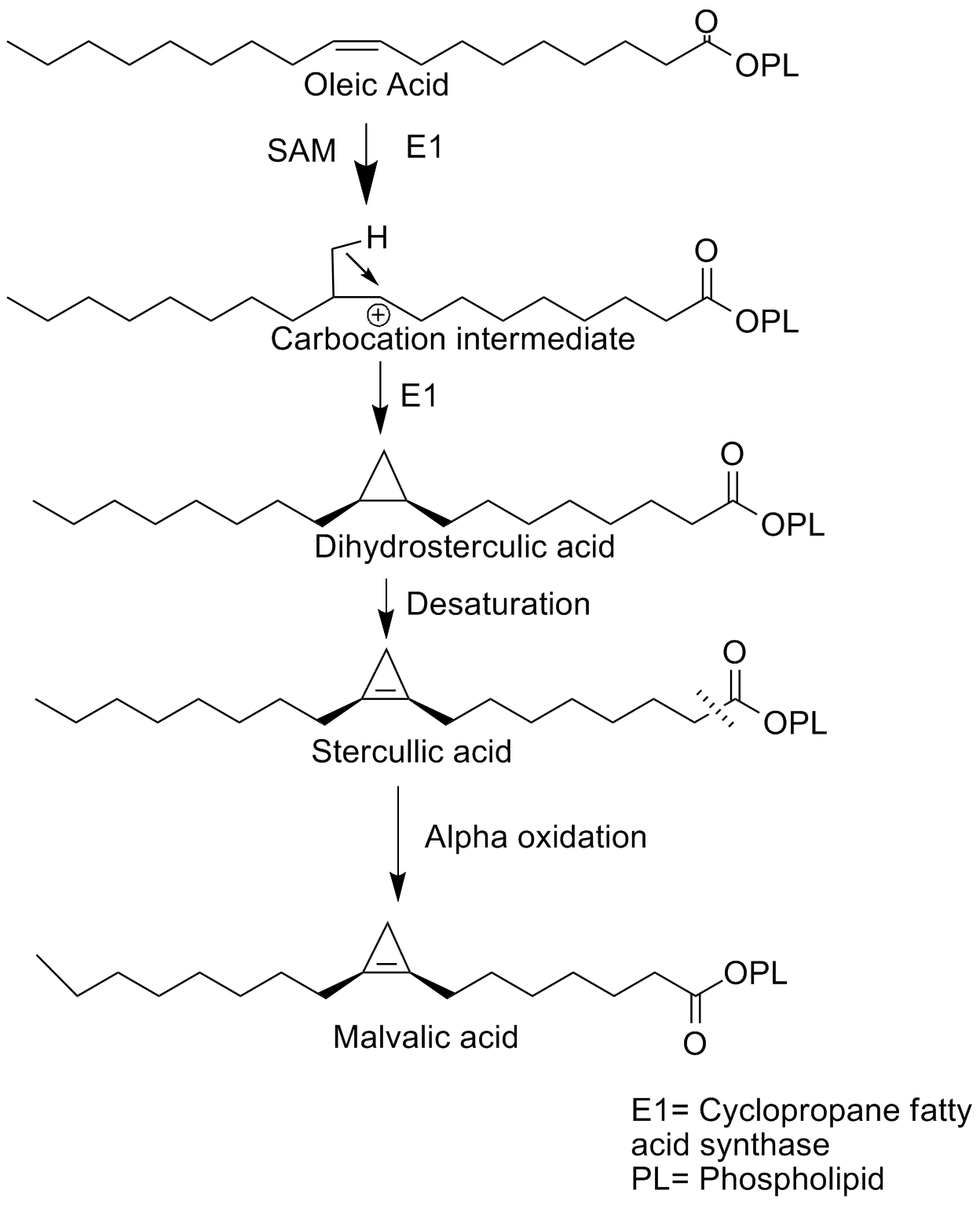
Biosynthesis
