= Vasicinone =

Names
- Preferred IUPAC name (1S)-1-Hydroxy-2,3-dihydropyrrolo[2,1-b]quinazolin-5(1H)-one

Identifiers
CAS Number	486-64-6
3D model (JSmol)	Interactive image
ChEBI	CHEBI:9936
ChEMBL	ChEMBL3120244
ChemSpider	391238
ECHA InfoCard	100.208.620
PubChem CID	442935
UNII	G6T5819NXM
CompTox Dashboard (EPA)	DTXSID80964090
- InChI: InChI=1S/C11H10N2O2/c14-9-5-6-13-10(9)12-8-4-2-1-3-7(8)11(13)15/h1-4,9,14H,5-6H2/t9-/m0/s1 Key: SDIVYZXRQHWCKF-VIFPVBQESA-N
- SMILES: C1CN2C(=NC3=CC=CC=C3C2=O)[C@H]1O

Properties
Chemical formula	C_{11}H_{10}N_{2}O_{2}
Molar mass	202.213 g·mol^{−1}
Density	1.5 g/cm^{3}
Melting point	200 to 202 °C (392 to 396 °F; 473 to 475 K)
- Except where otherwise noted, data are given for materials in their standard state (at 25 °C [77 °F], 100 kPa). Infobox references

Vasicinone is a quinazoline alkaloid. It shows bronchodilator action in vitro but bronchoconstrictor action in vivo. Vasicinone was shown to have an antianaphylactic action. It has been found within Peganum harmala.

Vasicinone has also been studied in combination with the related alkaloid vasicine. Both the alkaloids in combination (1:1) showed pronounced bronchodilatory activity in vivo and in vitro. Both alkaloids are also respiratory stimulants. Vasicine has a cardiac–depressant effect, while vasicinone is a weak cardiac stimulant; the effect can be normalized by combining the alkaloids. Vasicine is reported to have a uterine stimulant effect.
