= Evodiamine =

Chemical compound

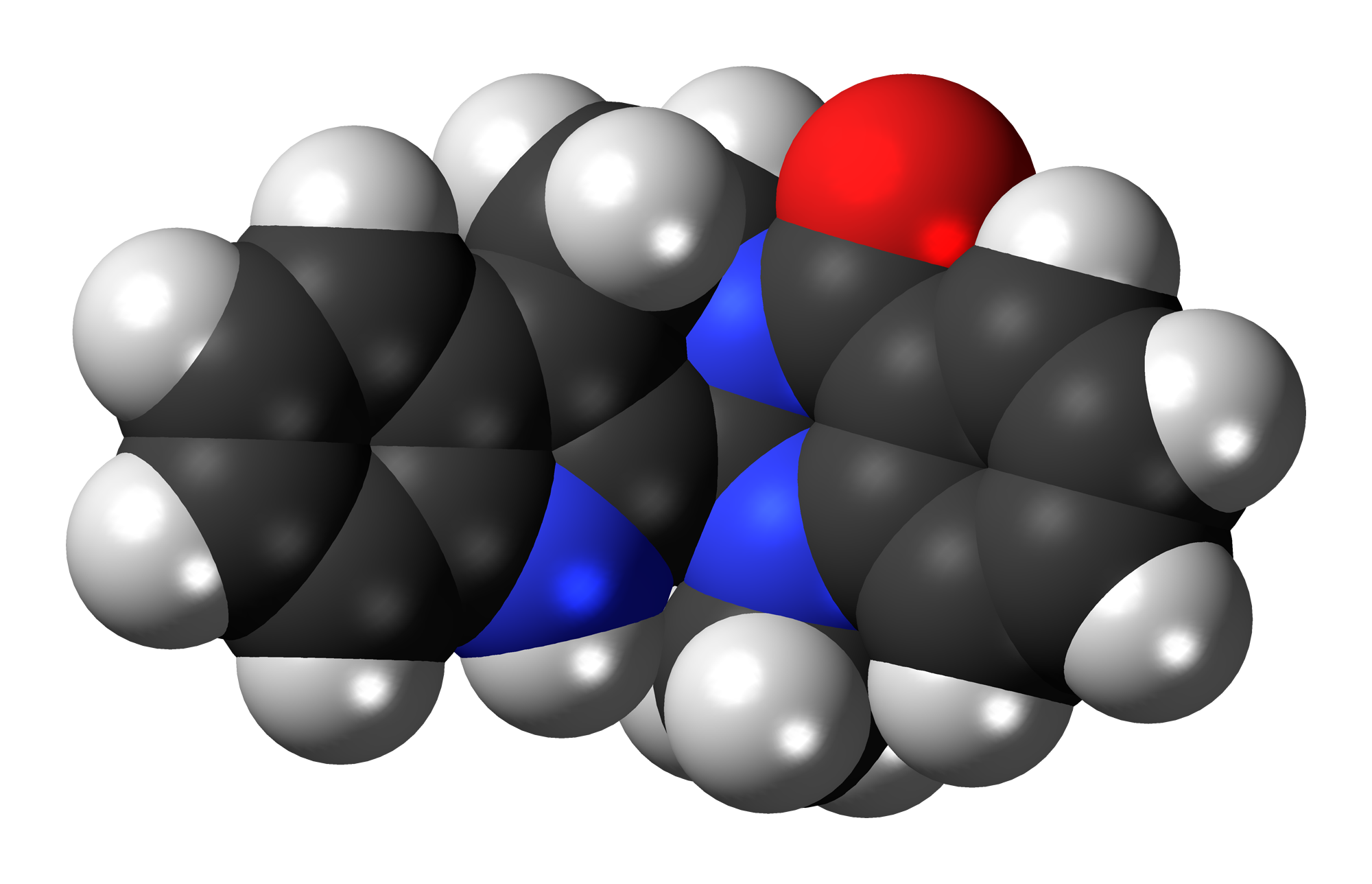

Clinical data
- ATC code: none

Identifiers
- IUPAC name: 21-Methyl-3,13,21-triazapentacyclo[11.8.0.0^{2,10}.0^{4,9}.0^{15,20}]henicosa-2(10),4,6,8,15,17,19-heptaen-14-one
- CAS Number: 518-17-2
- PubChem CID: 442088
- ChemSpider: 133343
- UNII: C01825BVNL
- ChEMBL: ChEMBL486598
- CompTox Dashboard (EPA): DTXSID10966123
- ECHA InfoCard: 100.164.846

Chemical and physical data
- Formula: C_{19}H_{17}N_{3}O
- Molar mass: 303.365 g·mol^{−1}
- 3D model (JSmol): Interactive image
- SMILES: O=C4N3CCc2c([nH]c1ccccc12)C3N(c5ccccc45)C
- InChI: InChI=1S/C19H17N3O/c1-21-16-9-5-3-7-14(16)19(23)22-11-10-13-12-6-2-4-8-15(12)20-17(13)18(21)22/h2-9,18,20H,10-11H2,1H3; Key:TXDUTHBFYKGSAH-UHFFFAOYSA-N

Evodiamine is a chemical compound extracted from the plant genus Tetradium, which has been shown to reduce fat uptake in mouse studies. It is suspected that its mechanism of action is similar to that of capsaicin. As such, it has been included in some dietary supplements. Neither its fat-burning effects in humans nor any potential side effects have been empirically established.

Evodiamine acts primarily as a thermogenic and stimulant.

Evodiamine may also act by increasing the number of serotonin transporters available in the brain, enhancing the reuptake of serotonin.
