= Malvalic acid =

Names
- Preferred IUPAC name 7-(2-Octylcycloprop-1-en-1-yl)heptanoic acid

Identifiers
CAS Number	503-05-9
3D model (JSmol)	Interactive image
ChEBI	CHEBI:6673
ChemSpider	9987
KEGG	C08321
PubChem CID	10416
UNII	02AJQ7VS2H
CompTox Dashboard (EPA)	DTXSID50198300
- InChI: InChI=1S/C18H32O2/c1-2-3-4-5-6-9-12-16-15-17(16)13-10-7-8-11-14-18(19)20/h2-15H2,1H3,(H,19,20) Key: HPSSZFFAYWBIPY-UHFFFAOYSA-N; InChI=1/C18H32O2/c1-2-3-4-5-6-9-12-16-15-17(16)13-10-7-8-11-14-18(19)20/h2-15H2,1H3,(H,19,20) Key: HPSSZFFAYWBIPY-UHFFFAOYAU
- SMILES: CCCCCCCCC1=C(C1)CCCCCCC(=O)O

Properties
Chemical formula	C_{18}H_{32}O_{2}
Molar mass	280.452 g·mol^{−1}
Melting point	10.5°C
- Except where otherwise noted, data are given for materials in their standard state (at 25 °C [77 °F], 100 kPa). verify (what is ?) Infobox references

Malvalic acid is a cyclopropene fatty acid found in baobab seed oil and cottonseed oil. This unusual molecule is thought to be one of the causes of abnormalities that develop in animals that ingest cottonseed oil. Refining processes, such as hydrogenation, can remove or destroy malvalic acid.

== Biosynthesis ==
The biosynthesis of malvalic acid starts with oleic acid, an 18-carbon monounsaturated fatty acid, leading to sterculic acid. An α-oxidation reaction removes one carbon from the chain to form the 17-carbon-chain structure of malvalic acid.

Wilson et al. demonstrated the co-occurrence of malvalic acid and the corresponding cyclopropane acids in several types of seeds. He suggested that methylene addition to oleic acid gave rise to dihydrosterculic acid, which was desaturated to sterculic acid, and that 8-heptadecenoic acid was similarly the precursor of dihydromalvalic acid and malvalic acid. Smith and Bu'Lock showed that in Hibiscus seedlings the chains of sterculic and malvalic acids, but not the ring methylene carbon, were derived from acetate. They showed that the labeling pattern in malvalic acid was the same as that in sterculic acid minus the carboxyl carbon. They explained the shortening by α oxidation occurring during the biogenesis of malvalic acid. Hooper and Law demonstrated that the ring methylene carbon of both cyclopropane and cyclopropene acids was derived from SAM-e in Hibiscus plants, and suggested from the distribution of label that the pathway was oleic → dihydrosterculic → sterculic acid.

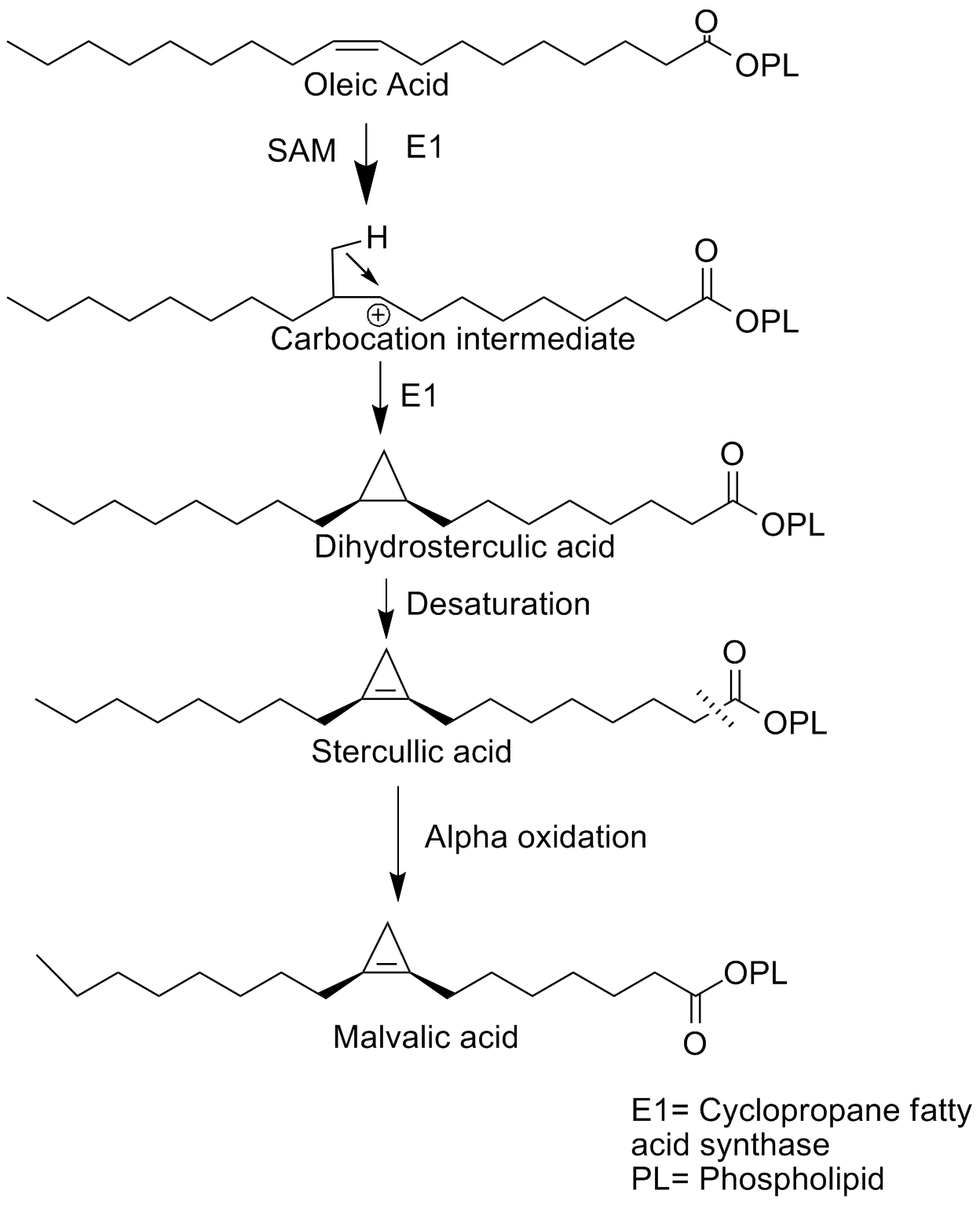
The proposed biosynthesis pathway
