= Cyclopropene =

Organic ring compound (C3H4)

- Skeletal formula of cyclopropene

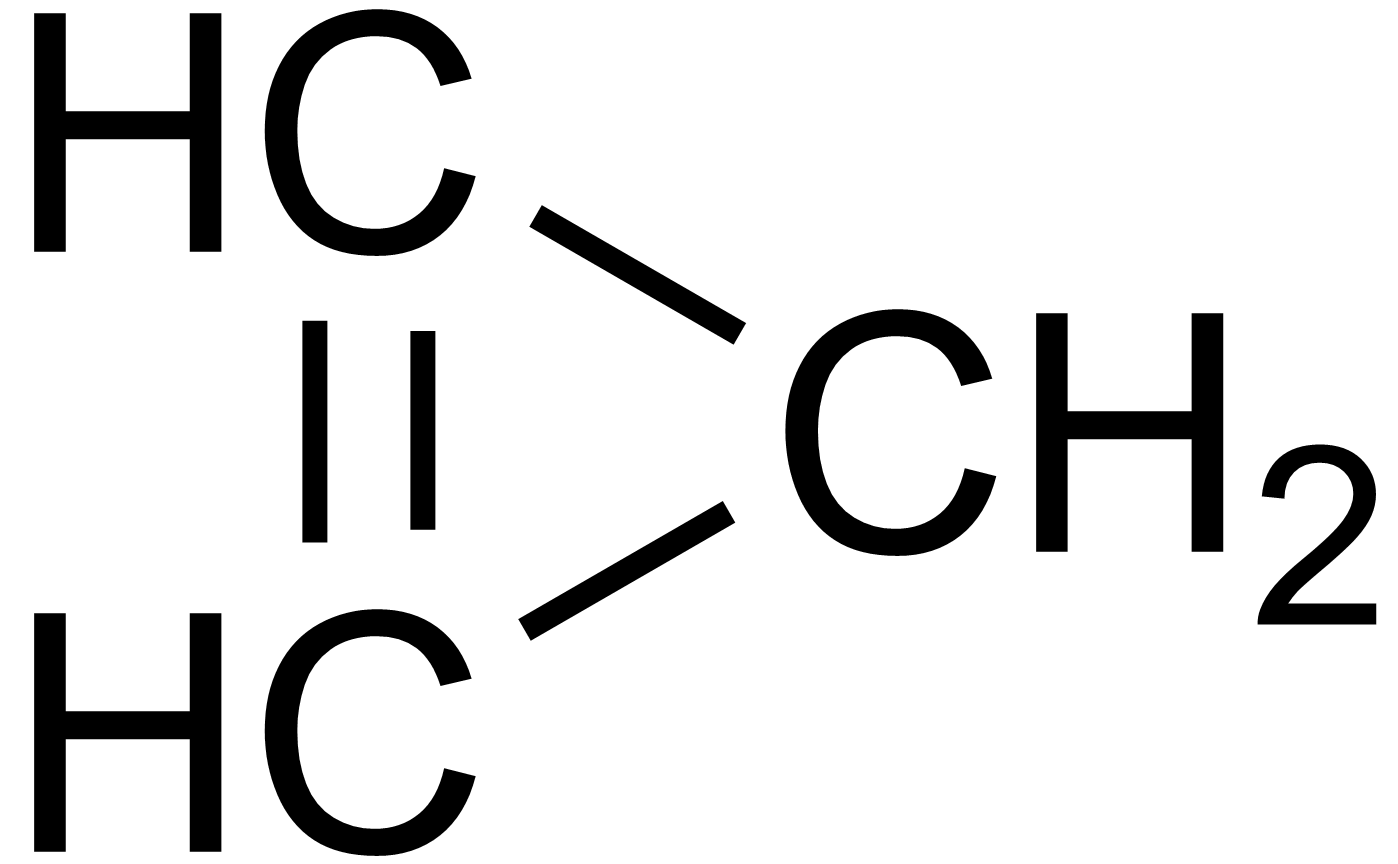
Skeletal formula of cyclopropene with implicit hydrogens shown
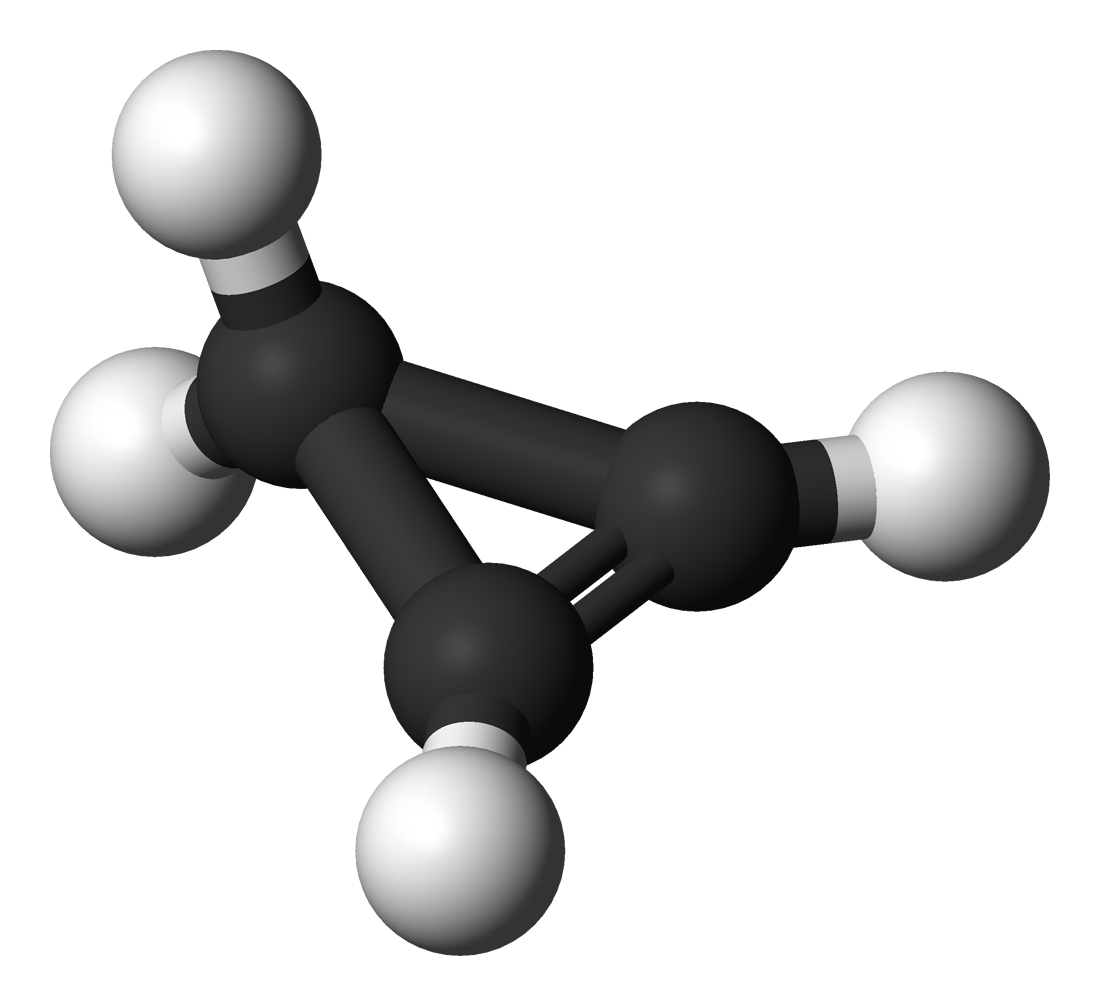
Ball and stick model of cyclopropene

Names
- Preferred IUPAC name Cyclopropene

Identifiers
CAS Number	2781-85-3
3D model (JSmol)	Interactive image
ChemSpider	109788
MeSH	cyclopropene
PubChem CID	123173
UNII	7B8994OHJ0
CompTox Dashboard (EPA)	DTXSID20893759
- InChI: InChI=1S/C3H4/c1-2-3-1/h1-2H,3H2 Key: OOXWYYGXTJLWHA-UHFFFAOYSA-N
- SMILES: C1C=C1

Properties
Chemical formula	C_{3}H_{4}
Molar mass	40.065 g·mol^{−1}
Boiling point	−36 °C (−33 °F; 237 K)

Thermochemistry
Heat capacity (C)	51.9–53.9 J K^{−1} mol^{−1}
Std enthalpy of combustion (Δ_{c}H^{⦵}_{298})	−2032 – −2026 kJ mol^{−1}
- Except where otherwise noted, data are given for materials in their standard state (at 25 °C [77 °F], 100 kPa). verify (what is ?) Infobox references

Cyclopropene is an organic compound with the formula C_{3}H_{4}. It is the simplest cycloalkene. Because the ring is highly strained, cyclopropene is difficult to prepare and highly reactive. This colorless gas has been the subject for many fundamental studies of bonding and reactivity. It does not occur naturally, but derivatives are known in some fatty acids. Derivatives of cyclopropene are used commercially to control ripening of some fruit.

== Structure and bonding ==
The molecule has a triangular structure. The reduced length of the double bond compared to a single bond causes the angle opposite the double bond to narrow to about 51° from the 60° angle found in cyclopropane. As with cyclopropane, the carbon–carbon bonding in the ring has increased p character: the alkene carbon atoms use sp^{2.68} hybridization for the ring.

== Synthesis of cyclopropene and derivatives ==
=== Early syntheses ===
The first confirmed synthesis of cyclopropene, carried out by Dem'yanov and Doyarenko, involved the thermal decomposition of trimethylcyclopropylammonium hydroxide over platinized clay at approximately 300 °C. This reaction produces mainly trimethylamine and dimethylcyclopropyl amine, together with about 5% of cyclopropene. Later Schlatter improved the pyrolytic reaction conditions using platinized asbestos as a catalyst at 320–330 °C and obtained cyclopropene in 45% yield.

Cyclopropene can also be obtained in about 1% yield by thermolysis of the adduct of cycloheptatriene and dimethyl acetylenedicarboxylate.

=== Modern syntheses from allyl chlorides ===
Allyl chloride undergoes dehydrohalogenation upon treatment with the base sodium amide at 80 °C to produce cyclopropene in about 10% yield.

CH_{2}=CHCH_{2}Cl + NaNH_{2} → C_{3}H_{4} + NaCl + NH_{3}

The major byproduct of the reaction is allylamine. Adding allyl chloride to sodium bis(trimethylsilyl)amide in boiling toluene over a period of 45–60 minutes produces the targeted compound in about 40% yield with an improvement in purity:

CH_{2}=CHCH_{2}Cl + NaN(TMS)_{2} → C_{3}H_{4} + NaCl + NH(TMS)_{2}

1-Methylcyclopropene, used to slow the ripening in fruits, is synthesized similarly but at room temperature from methallylchloride using phenyllithium as the base:

CH_{2}=C(CH_{3})CH_{2}Cl + LiC_{6}H_{5} → CH_{3}−C_{3}H_{3} + LiCl + C_{6}H_{6}

== Derivatives ==
Treatment of nitrocyclopropanes with sodium methoxide eliminates the nitrite, giving the respective cyclopropene derivative.

The synthesis of purely aliphatic cyclopropenes was first illustrated by the copper-catalyzed additions of carbenes to alkynes. In the presence of a copper catalyst, ethyl diazoacetate reacts with acetylenes to give cyclopropenes. 1,2-Dimethylcyclopropene-3-carboxylate arises via this method from 2-butyne. Copper, as copper sulfate and copper dust, are among the more popular forms of copper used to promote such reactions. Rhodium acetate has also been used.

Cyclopropene derivatives are generally too unstable for storage, unless they are disubstituted at the tetrahedral carbon atom. In some cases, monosubstitution with a bulky substituent provides adequate stabilization.

Due to ring strain, cyclopropenes are highly active dienophiles.

== Reactions of cyclopropene ==
Studies on cyclopropene mainly focus on the consequences of its high ring strain. At 425 °C, cyclopropene isomerizes to methylacetylene (propyne).

C_{3}H_{4} → H_{3}CC≡CH

Attempted fractional distillation of cyclopropene at –36 °C (its predicted boiling point) results in polymerization. The mechanism is assumed to be a free-radical chain reaction, and the product, based on NMR spectra, is thought to be polycyclopropane.

Cyclopropene undergoes the Diels–Alder reaction with cyclopentadiene to give endo-tricyclo[3.2.1.0^{2,4}]oct-6-ene. This reaction is commonly used to check for the presence of cyclopropene, following its synthesis.

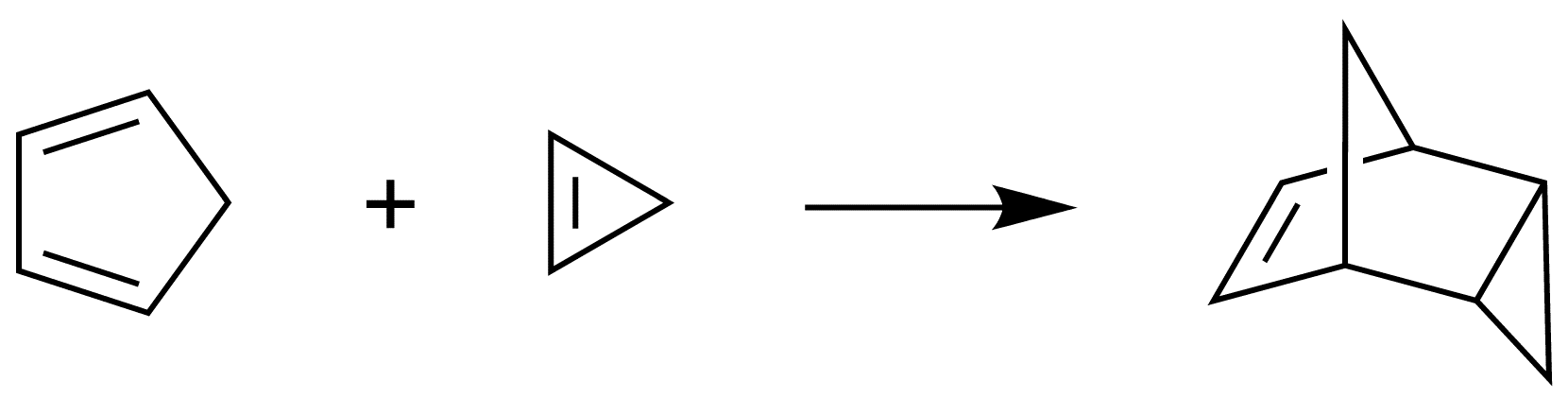

== Related compounds ==
- Borirenes, phosphirenes, and silirenes are boron-, phosphorus-, and silicon-substituted cyclopropenes, with the formula RBC_{2}R'_{2}, RPC_{2}R'_{2}, and R_{2}SiC_{2}R'_{2}.
- Cyclopropene fatty acids a class of naturally occurring cyclopropenes.
