= Phosphetene =

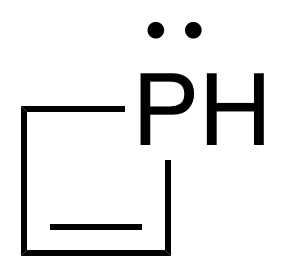
1,2-Dihydrophosphete
(Δ^{2}-phosphetene)
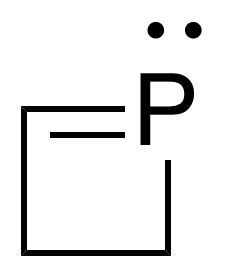
2,3-Dihydrophosphete
(Δ^{1}-phosphetene)

Identifiers
CAS Number	1,2-dihydrophosphete: 132515-09-4
3D model (JSmol)	1,2-dihydrophosphete: Interactive image; 2,3-dihydrophosphete: Interactive image
ChemSpider	2,3-dihydrophosphete: 26668677
PubChem CID	1,2-dihydrophosphete: 16706833; 2,3-dihydrophosphete: 14973798
CompTox Dashboard (EPA)	1,2-dihydrophosphete: DTXSID80587263
- InChI: 1,2-dihydrophosphete: InChI=1S/C3H5P/c1-2-4-3-1/h1-2,4H,3H2 Key: UJPZNVXMZCSJLL-UHFFFAOYSA-N; 2,3-dihydrophosphete: InChI=1S/C3H5P/c1-2-4-3-1/h2H,1,3H2 Key: ZMVNDSAMUMOMJD-UHFFFAOYSA-N
- SMILES: 1,2-dihydrophosphete: C1C=CP1; 2,3-dihydrophosphete: C1CP=C1

Properties
Chemical formula	C_{3}H_{5}P
Molar mass	72.047 g·mol^{−1}
- Except where otherwise noted, data are given for materials in their standard state (at 25 °C [77 °F], 100 kPa). Infobox references

A phosphetene is an unsaturated four-membered organophosphorus heterocycle containing one phosphorus atom. It is a heavier analog of an azetine, or dihydroazete. The first synthesis of a stable, isolable phosphetene was reported in 1985 via ring expansion of a phosphirene-metal carbonyl complex. Other synthesis routes include cyclization of phosphabutadienes, [2 + 2] cycloaddition, intramolecular arrangement, addition, and through organometallic intermediates.

The latter is of interest to the application, where organometallic intermediate synthesis led to colored phosphetene compounds suitable for incorporation in OLED devices. Phosphetenes can also participate in reactions involving the lone pair of electrons at the phosphorus ring opening, or ring expansion.

== Nomenclature ==
According to the extended Hantzsch-Widman system of naming heterocyclic parent hydrides, the saturated four-membered ring containing one phosphorus atom is called a phosphetane. The presence of one double bond yields a phosphetene. Alternately, it can be called a dihydrophosphete, as a phosphete is the cyclobutadiene-like structure containing two double bonds.

Different constitutional isomers are possible, depending on whether or not the double bond is attached to the phosphorus. The phosphorus is assigned position 1 on the ring, and the other structural features are numbered relative to it. They can be distinguished based on where the double bond is in the phosphetene (Δ^{1}-phosphetene vs Δ^{2}-phosphetene) or where the double bond is missing as compared with the phosphete (1,2-dihydrophosphete vs 3,4-dihydrophosphete, the latter also called 2,3-dihydrophosphete).

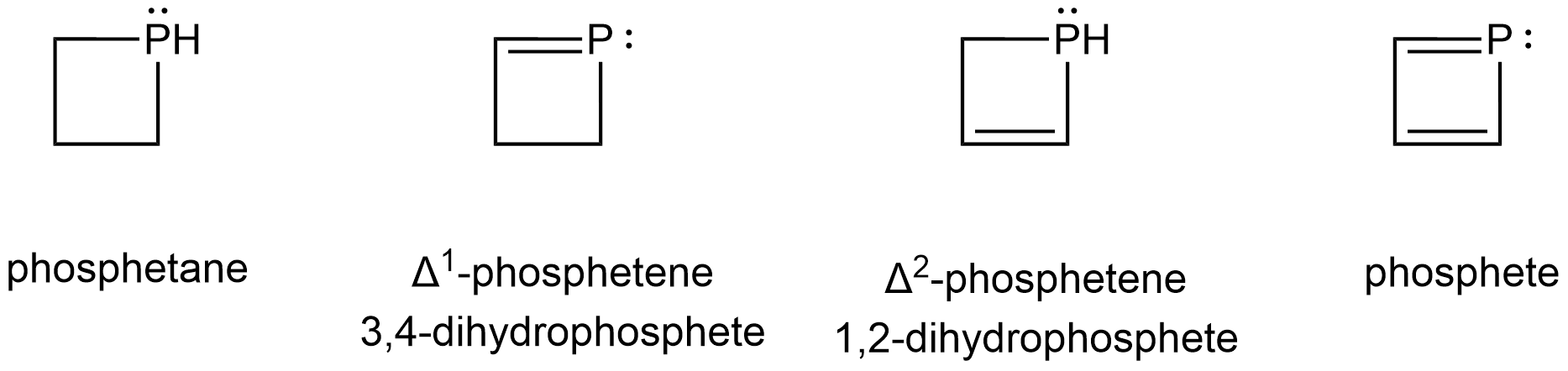
Parent phosphetane, phosphetenes, and phosphete molecules.

== Synthesis ==
=== Via ring expansion ===
Isolation of the first phosphetene was reported by Mathey et al. in 1985 by the thermolysis of phosphirene-metal pentacarbonyl complexes in the presence of carbon monoxide. This resulted in a 34% yield of a solid orange phosphorus analogue of unsaturated β-lactams, where the phosphorus atom was coordinated to the metal pentacarbonyl complex. The team decomplexed the metal pentacarbonyl complex from the phosphetene, but oxidation at the phosphorus takes place spontaneously, resulting in a λ^{5}σ^{4} 1,2-dihydrophosphete oxide solid with a yellow color.

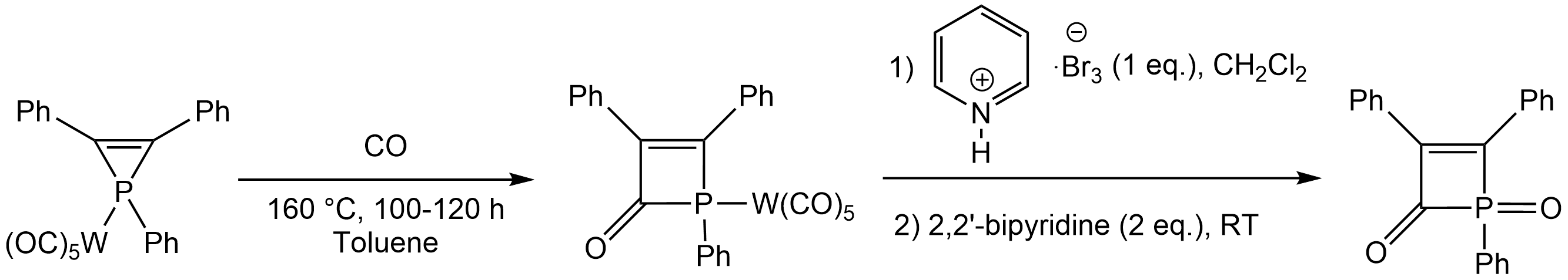
First isolable phosphetene synthesis reported by Mathey et al.

The reaction of phosphatriafulvenes with azides resulted in the ring expansion into 1H-2-iminophosphetes. However, in the presence of excess azide, the Staudinger reaction can take place, which transforms the yellow λ^{3}σ^{3} 1H-2-iminophosphete into a λ^{5}σ^{4} iminophosphorane product.

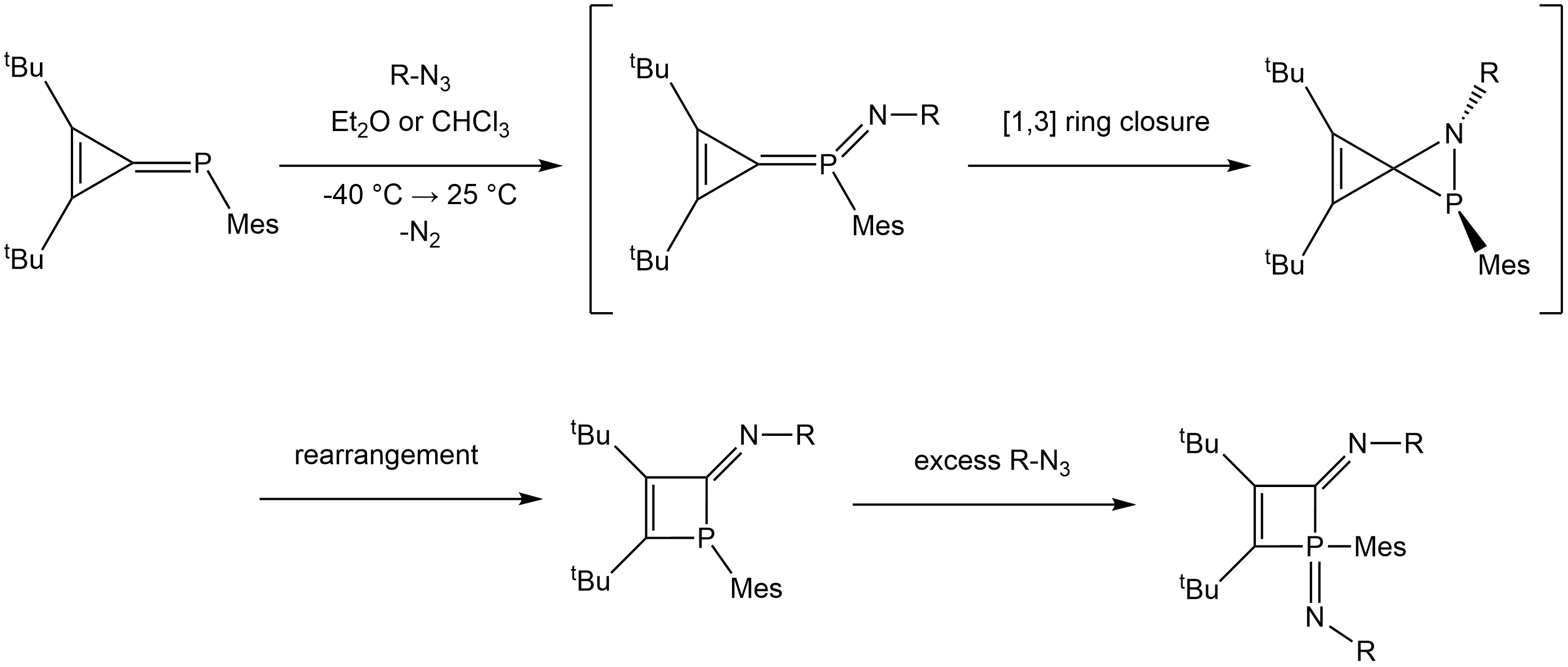
Synthesis of 1H-2-iminophosphetes by ring expansion of phosphatriafulvenes performed by Regitz et al. (1994). (R group of the azide includes 1-naphthyl, 3-chlorophenyl, 4-chlorophenyl, and 3-nitrophenyl.)

A 1,2-dihydro-1-phosphet-2-one complex can be obtained, in a mixture with other compounds, from the reaction of phosphirene-metal complexes with diethylamine.

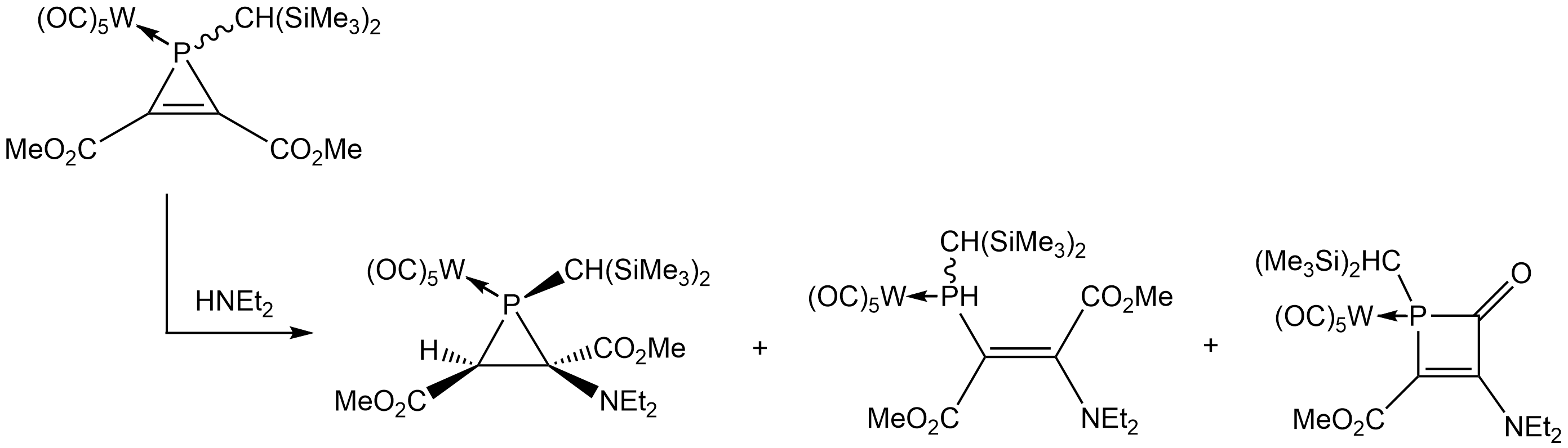
Reaction of phosphirene-metal complex with diethylamine yields a mixture of three products in a near 1:1:1 ratio.

=== Phosphabutadiene cyclization ===
Ring formation from phosphabutadienes was observed via 1,2-dihydrophosphetes from the reaction of 1-[bis(trimethylsilyl)amino]phosphadiene with Me_{3}SiN_{3} or elemental sulfur through a 3-coordinate (methylene)phosphorane intermediate.

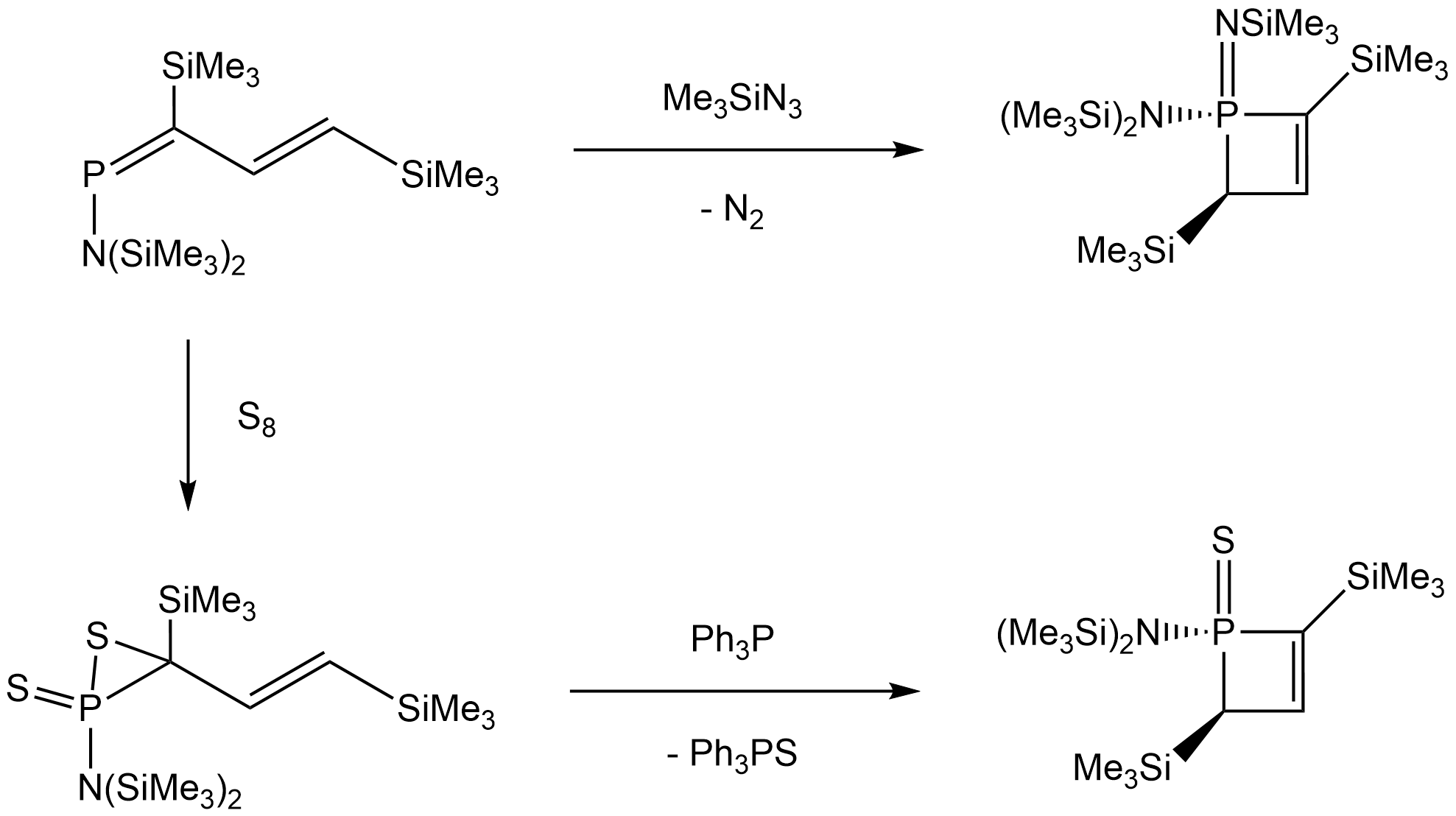
Reaction of 1-[bis(trimethylsilyl)amino] phosphadiene with trimethylsilyl azide or elemental sulfur.

Reacting halogenated ylides with AlCl_{3} forms dihydrophosphetium salts in an intramolecular cyclization reaction. Aromaticity is restored by subsequent reaction with pyridine, then a strong base, sodium bis(trimethylsilyl)amide, to form a neutral λ^{5}-phosphete with a highly polarized P=C bond.

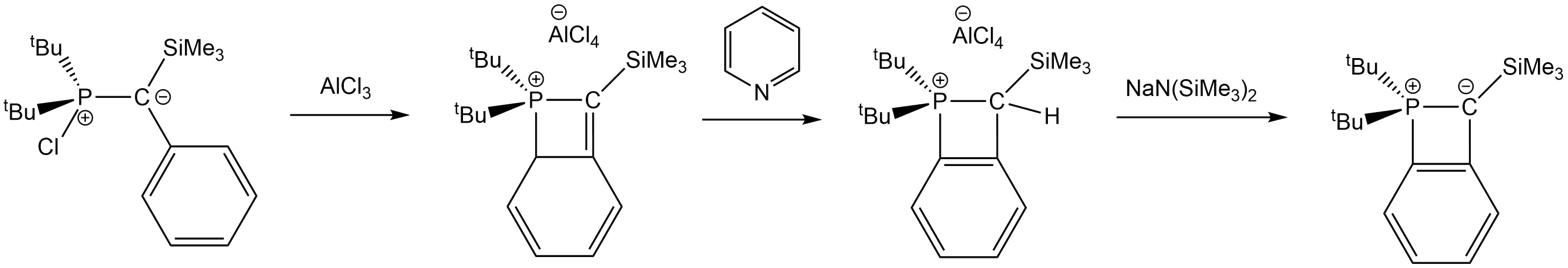
Reaction of halogenated phosphorus ylides with AlCl_{3}, pyridine, and a strong base to form a neutral λ^{5}-phosphete.

An air-stable, colorless, isolable 1,2-dihydrophosphete intermediate was discovered in 1993 during the synthesis of phosphaalkynes from phosphalkenes.

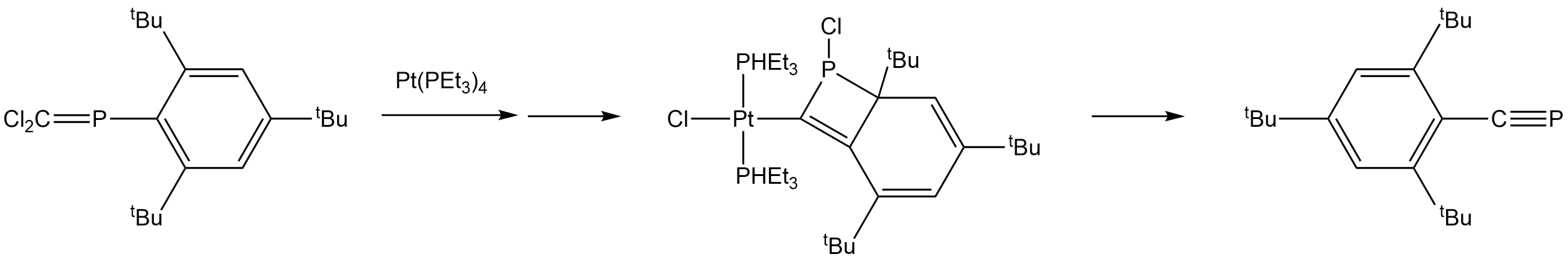
A 1,2-dihydrophosphete as an intermediate in the synthesis of phosphaalkynes from phosphaalkenes.

In 1997 researchers synthesized a η^{1}-3,4-dihydrophosphete ligand complexed to metal pentacarbonyl from η^{1}-2-phosphabutadiene complexes, which was in turn synthesized from the reaction of metal carbene complexes with a chlorophosphane.

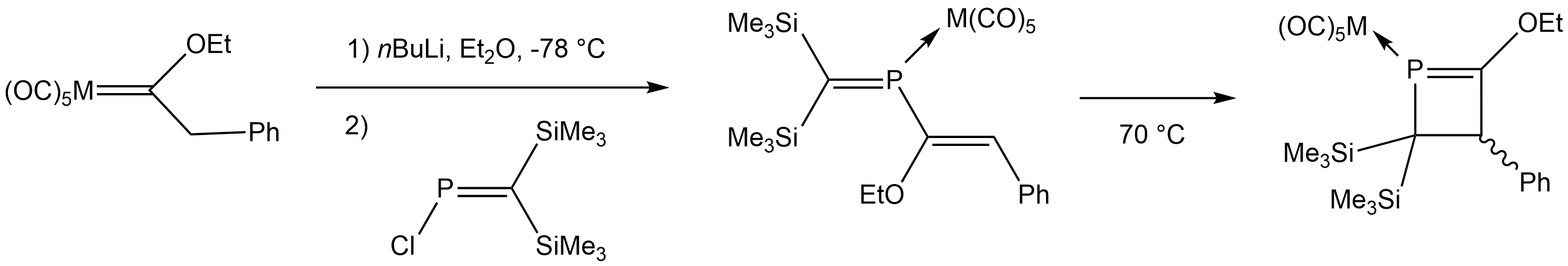
Synthesis of η^{1}-3,4-dihydrophosphete metal complexes from η^{1}-2-phosphabutadiene metal complexes. (M = Cr, W)

=== [2 + 2] cycloaddition reactions ===
The formation of 1,2-dihydrophosphetes from [2 + 2] cycloaddition reactions involves the reaction of metal phosphaalkane complexes with alkenes or alkynes.

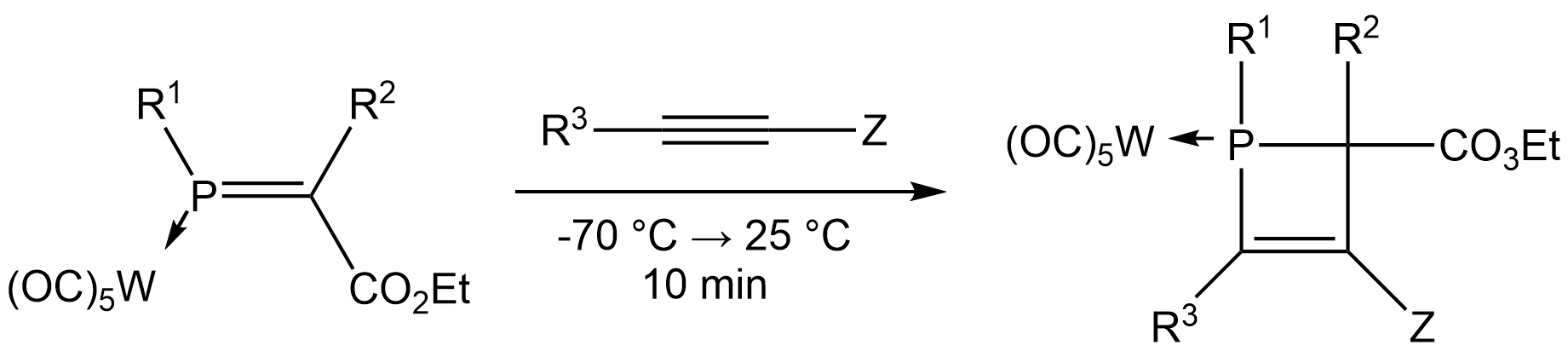
1,2-dihydrophosphetes formed from [2 + 2] cycloaddition of phosphaalkenes and alkynes by Mathey et al. (1990). (R^{1} = R^{2} = Me / R^{1} = Ph, R^{2} = Me / R^{1} = Ph, R^{2} = CO_{2}Et) (R^{3} = Me, Z = NEt_{2} or R^{3} = H, Z = OEt)

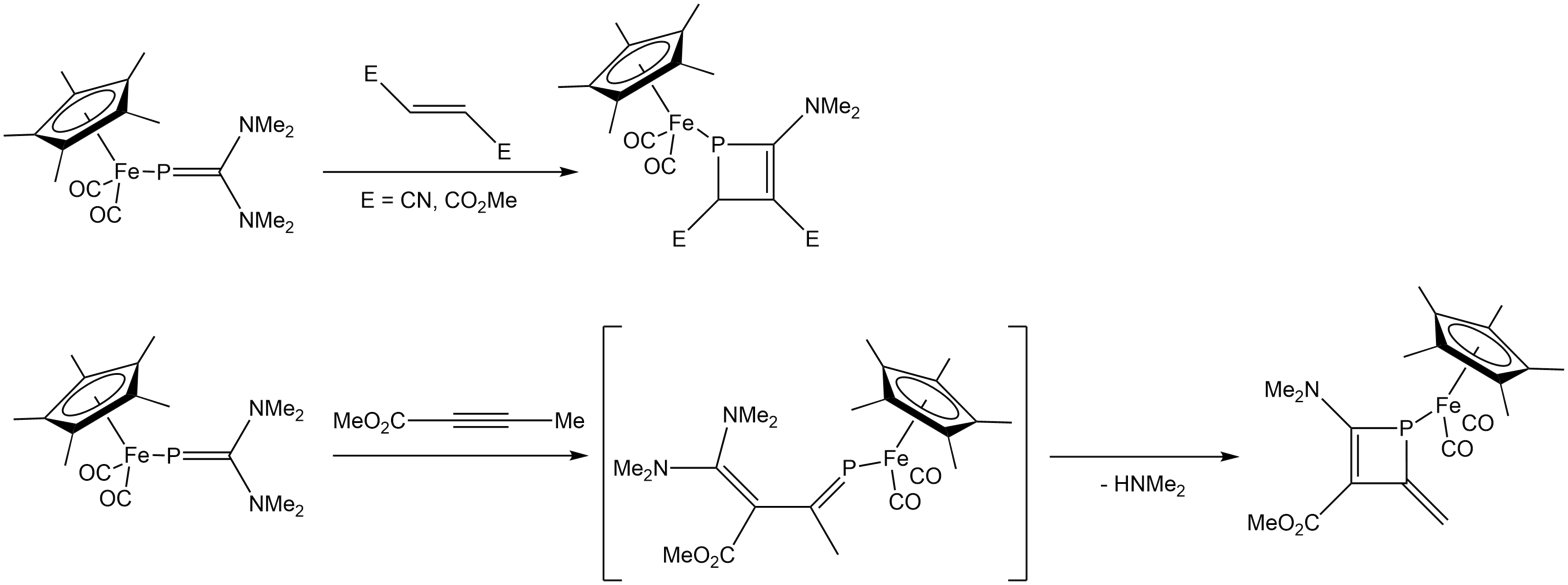
The versatility of the reaction between a metallo-phosphaalkene complex and an alkene or an alkyne. (Boese et al., 1994)

=== Intramolecular rearrangement ===
Niecke et al. (1994) reacted three equivalents of iminophosphoranes with a diyne, which resulted in a 1,2-dihydrophosphete attached to a diphosphole ring, with the formation of intermediate diphosphetene compounds.

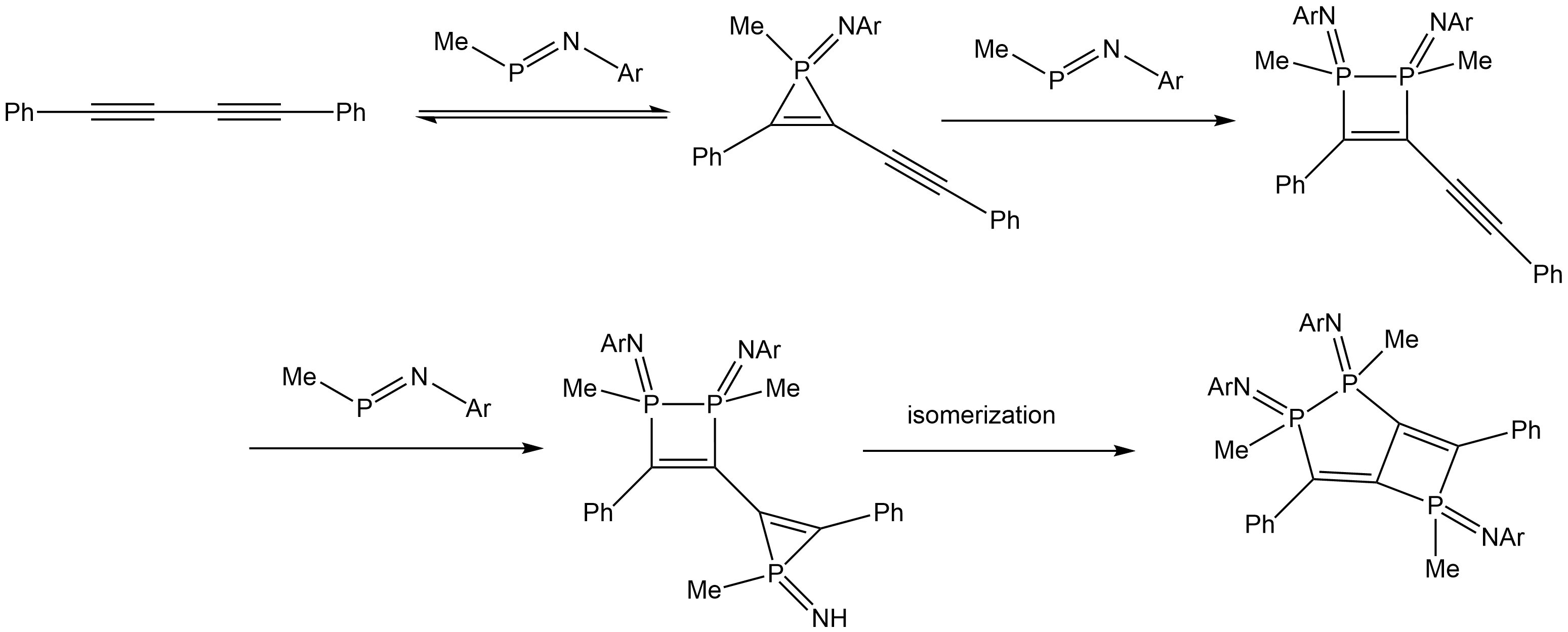
Synthesis of a bicyclic compound incorporating a 1,2-dihydrophosphetene from the reaction of a diyne with three equivalents of an iminophosphorane.

In 1995, 3,4-dihydrophosphetes were obtained from the reaction of 1,3-diphosphetes with CS_{2}, COS, or CO_{2}.

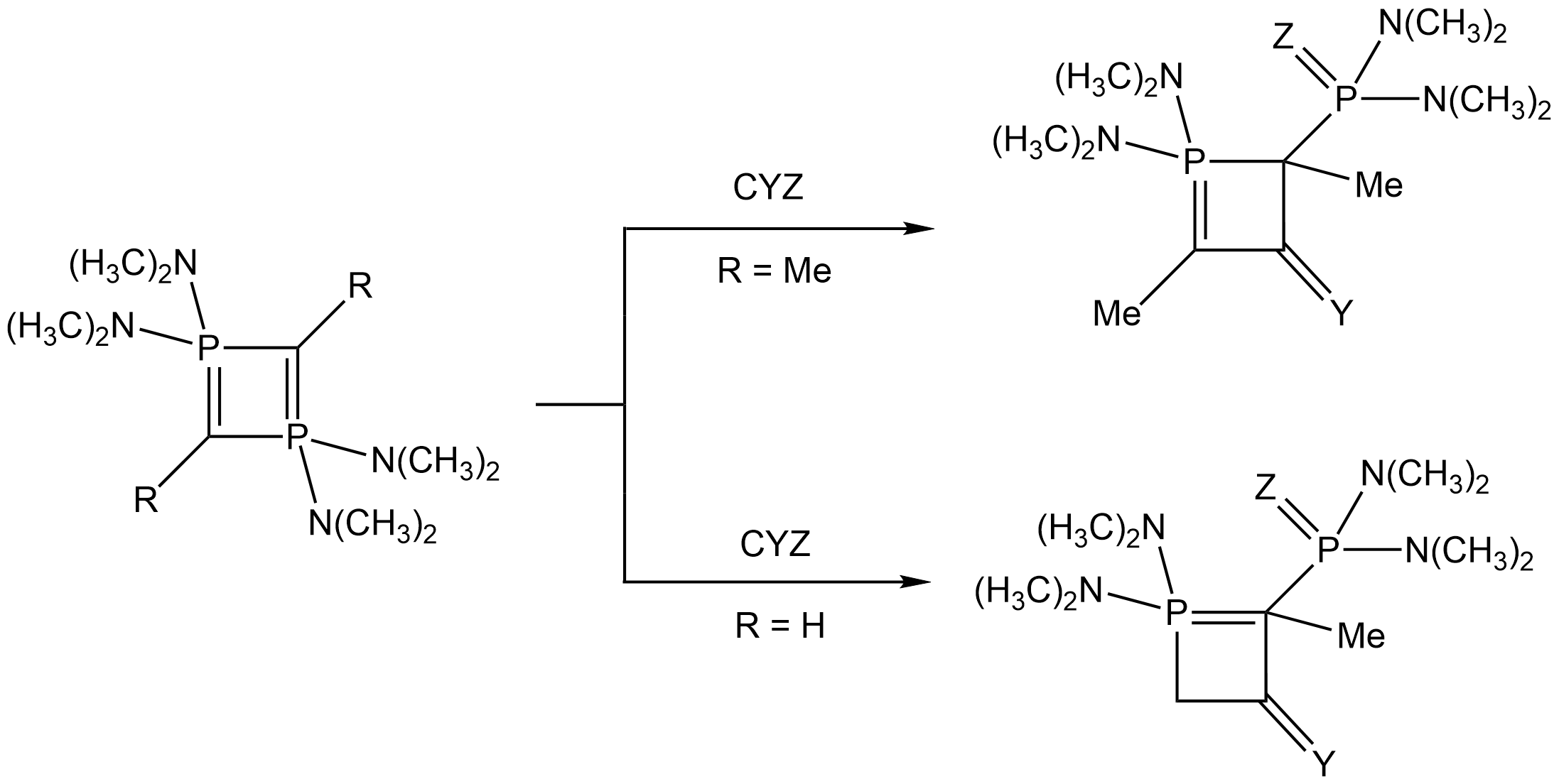
Synthesis of 3,4-dihydrophosphete from the reaction of 1,3-diphosphete with CO_{2}, CS_{2}, or COS. Notice the unsaturation are in different positions when R is a hydrogen as opposed to when R is a methyl group.

=== Addition reaction ===
The 2,4-diphosphoniodihydrophosphetide cation is an unusually stable synthetic intermediate, produced from the addition reaction of 1,3-diphosphoniopropenide with chlorophosphines.

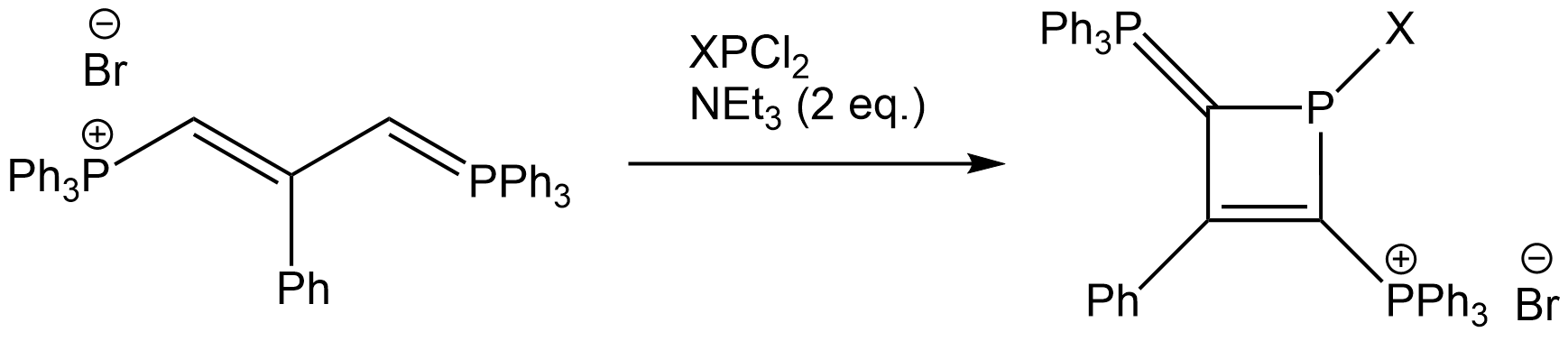
Synthesis of 2,4-diphosphoniodihydrophosphetide cations from 1,3-diphosphoniopropenide and chlorophosphines. (X = Ph, Cl)

=== Organometallic intermediates ===
The synthesis of 1,2-dihydrophosphetes in 1989 from diphenyltitanacyclobutene (prepared from Tebbe's reagent) and dichlorophenylphosphine was remarkable due to the clean synthesis and workup and the resulting white 1,2-dihydrophosphetes were inert toward oxidation and in high yield (66%). Tebbe's reagent was used to prepare a novel bidentate ligand consisting of phosphorus heterocycles of 1-phosphinine-1,2-dihydrophosphetes.

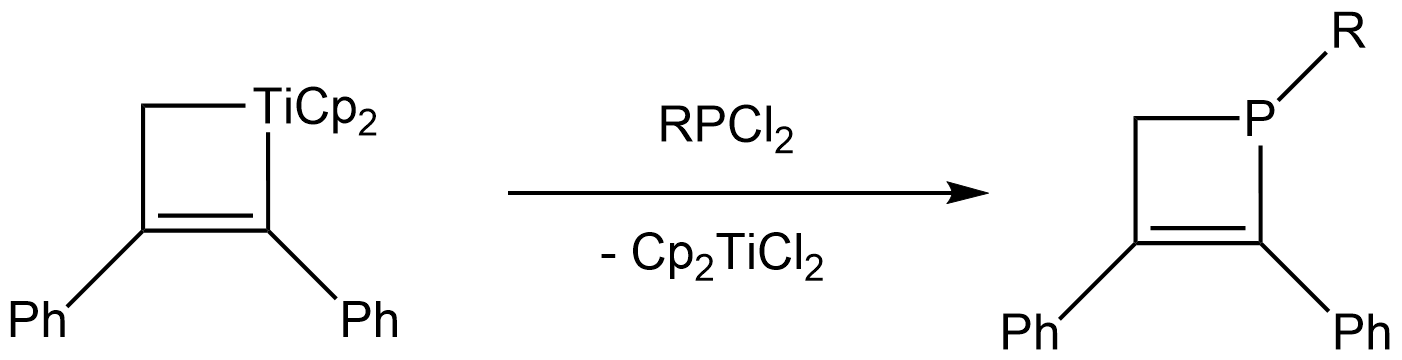
Synthesis of 1,2-dihydrophosphetes from diphenyltitanacyclobutene and chlorophosphines by Doxsee et al. (1989). (R = Ph, Et, ^{t}Bu, OEt)

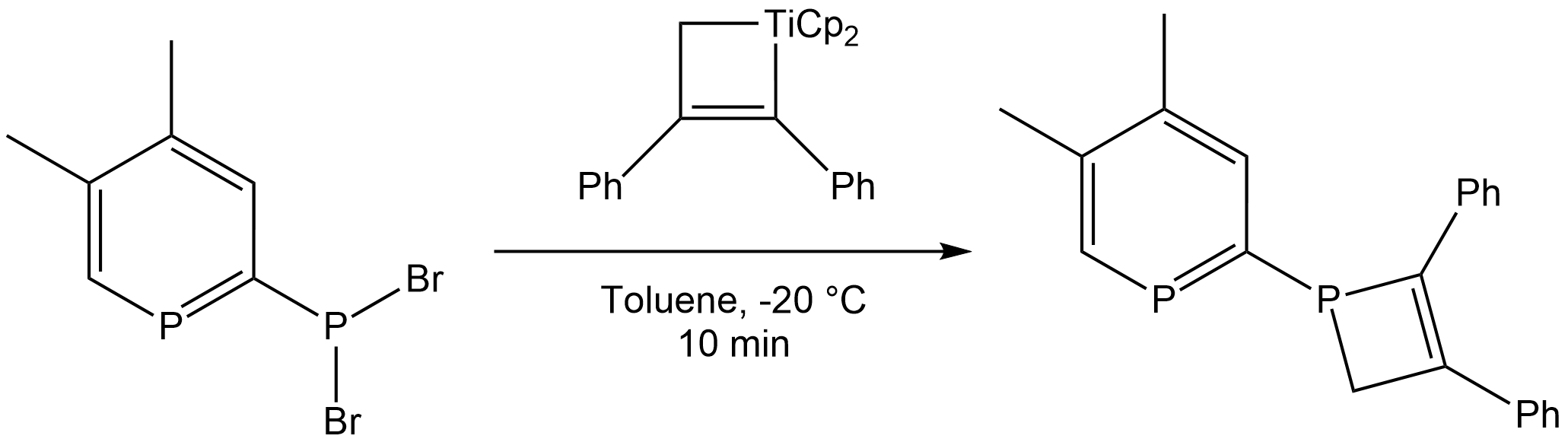
Synthesis of a novel bidentate ligand with a phosphinine and a 1,2-dihydrophosphete scaffold by using titanocyclobutene (Mathey et al., 1996).

Majoral et al. (1997) were able to synthesize a 1,2-dihydrophosphete-zirconium complex from intramolecular coupling of dialkynyl phosphane and zirconocene-benzyne.

The complex was then treated with an acid to yield a π-extended dihydrophosphetes. This method was applied by Hissler et al. in 2014 to observe the optical and redox properties of π-extended dihydrophosphetes. With the introduction of various electron-rich substituents on the π-backbone, the dihydrophosphetes displayed shifting of color in the visible region varying from blue to green, which was tested in a multilayer OLED device. As of 2023, Cummins et al. have been able to synthesize free, uncomplexed phosphet-2-ones with high yield using a phosphinidene transfer agent derived from anthracene. The reactivity of the phosphet-2-ones with stabilized Wittig reagents at 100 °C led to a high yield of 1,2-dihydrophosphete products with a backbone structure that resembles Hissler's polyunsaturated dihydrophosphetes used in the OLED devices.

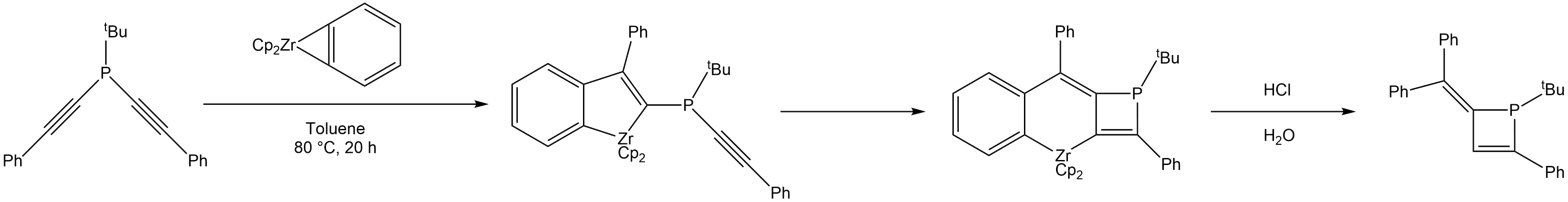
Synthesis of a 1,2-dihydrophosphete-zirconium complex by Majoral et al. (1997). Acidic treatment of complex results in π-extended dihydrophosphetes.

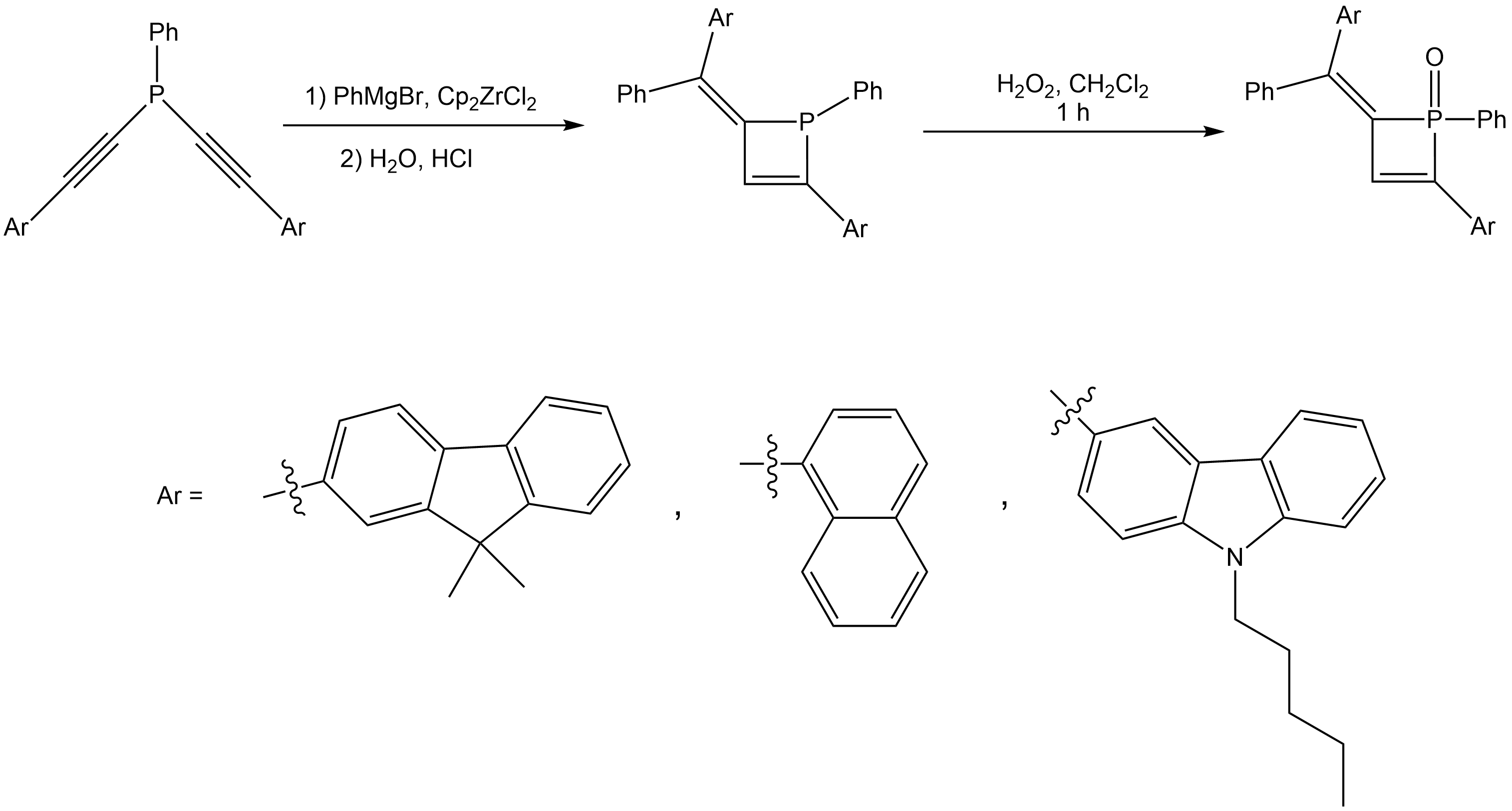
Synthesis of π-extended dihydrophosphetes by Hissler et al. (2014) Examples of aryl groups for compounds that were tested in OLED devices are provided.

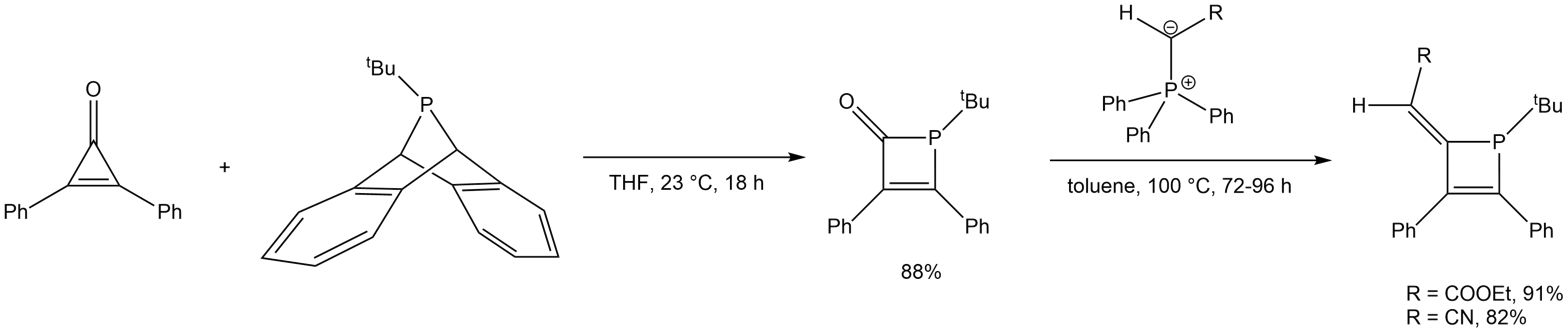
Synthesis of uncomplexed phosphet-2-one from diphenylcycloproprenone and a phosphinidine transfer reagent with high (88% yield). The resulting phosphet-2-one can be further reacted with a Wittig reagent to produce 1,2-dihydrophosphetes.

== Reactivity ==
=== Reactivity at the phosphorus atom ===
Phosphetenes with a lone pair at the phosphorus atom behaved similarly to a two-electron P-donor, such as the ability to coordinate with metals. Structural changes in phosphetene metal complexes are consistent with an increased s-character of the phosphorus.

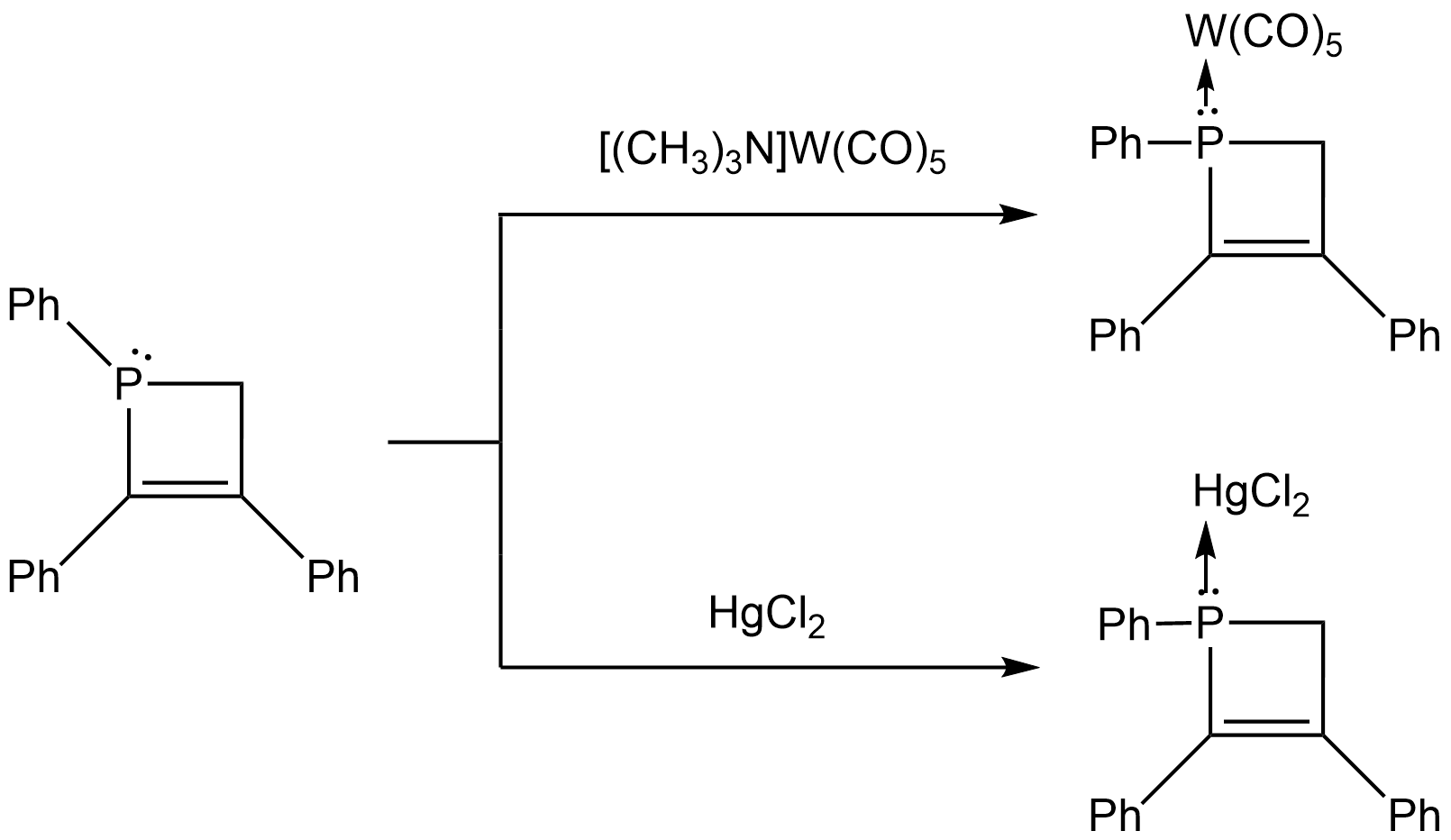
Examples of coordination of the lone pair on the phosphorus to a metal center.

=== Ring-opening followed by cycloaddition ===
Ring-opening of phosphetenes leads to phosphabutadiene derivatives that can further react. 1,2-dihydrophosphete tungsten pentacarbonyl complexes react at high temperatures with dienophiles through [4 + 2] cycloaddition yielding obtain 6-membered phosphorus heterocycles, through a masked 1-phoshabutadiene intermediate. X-ray crystal structure analysis reveals that the bond between the phosphorus and sp^{3} carbon is long and weak (1.904 Å), which leads to the equilibrium of the 1,2-dihydrophosphete with 1-phosphabutadiene. Michael addition binds 1,3,4-triphenyl-1,2-dihydrophosphete with various compounds to form 6-membered phosphorus heterocycles.

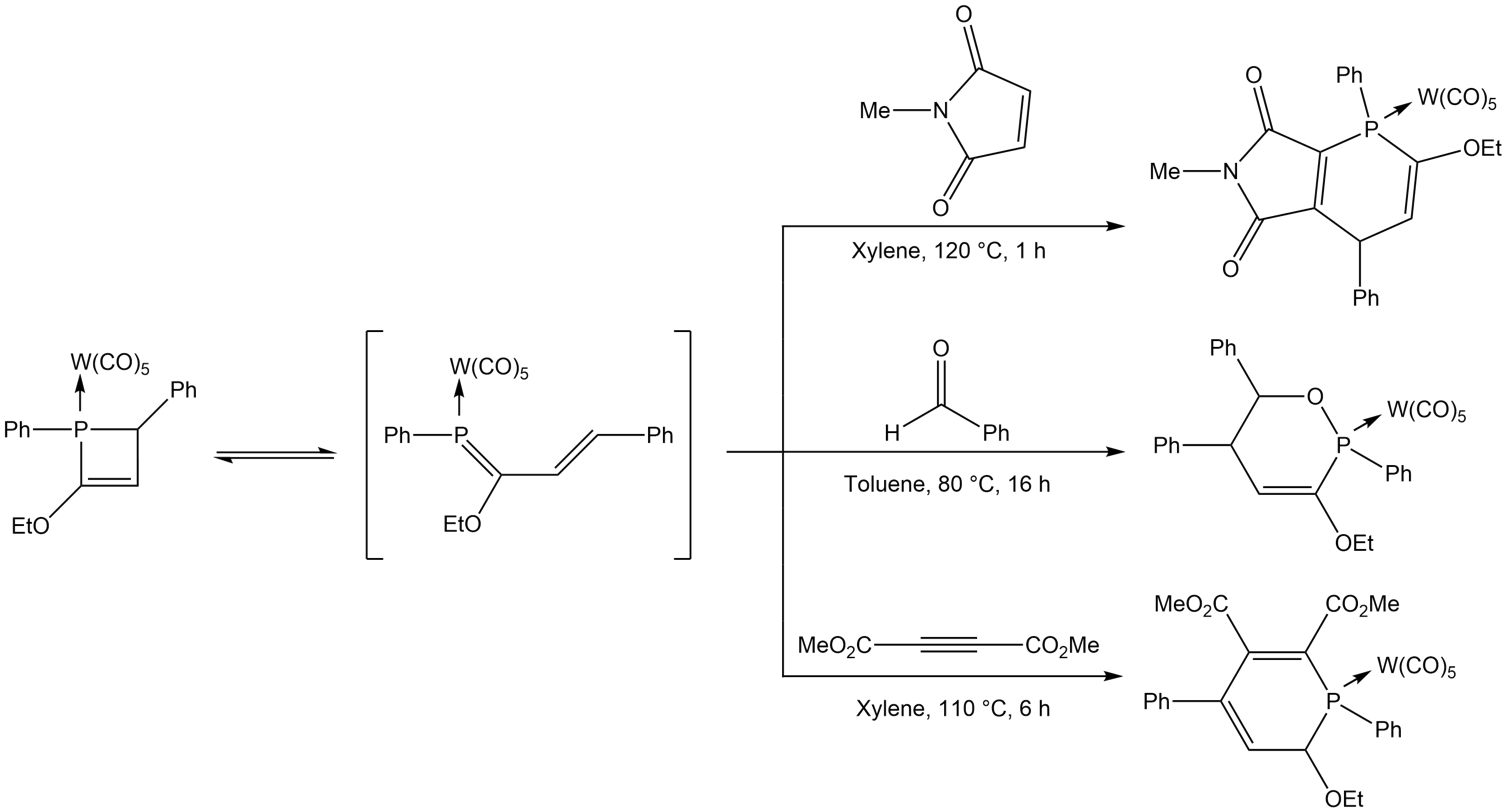
Reactions between a 1,2-dihydrophosphete metal complex and various dienophiles (Mathey et al., 1988).

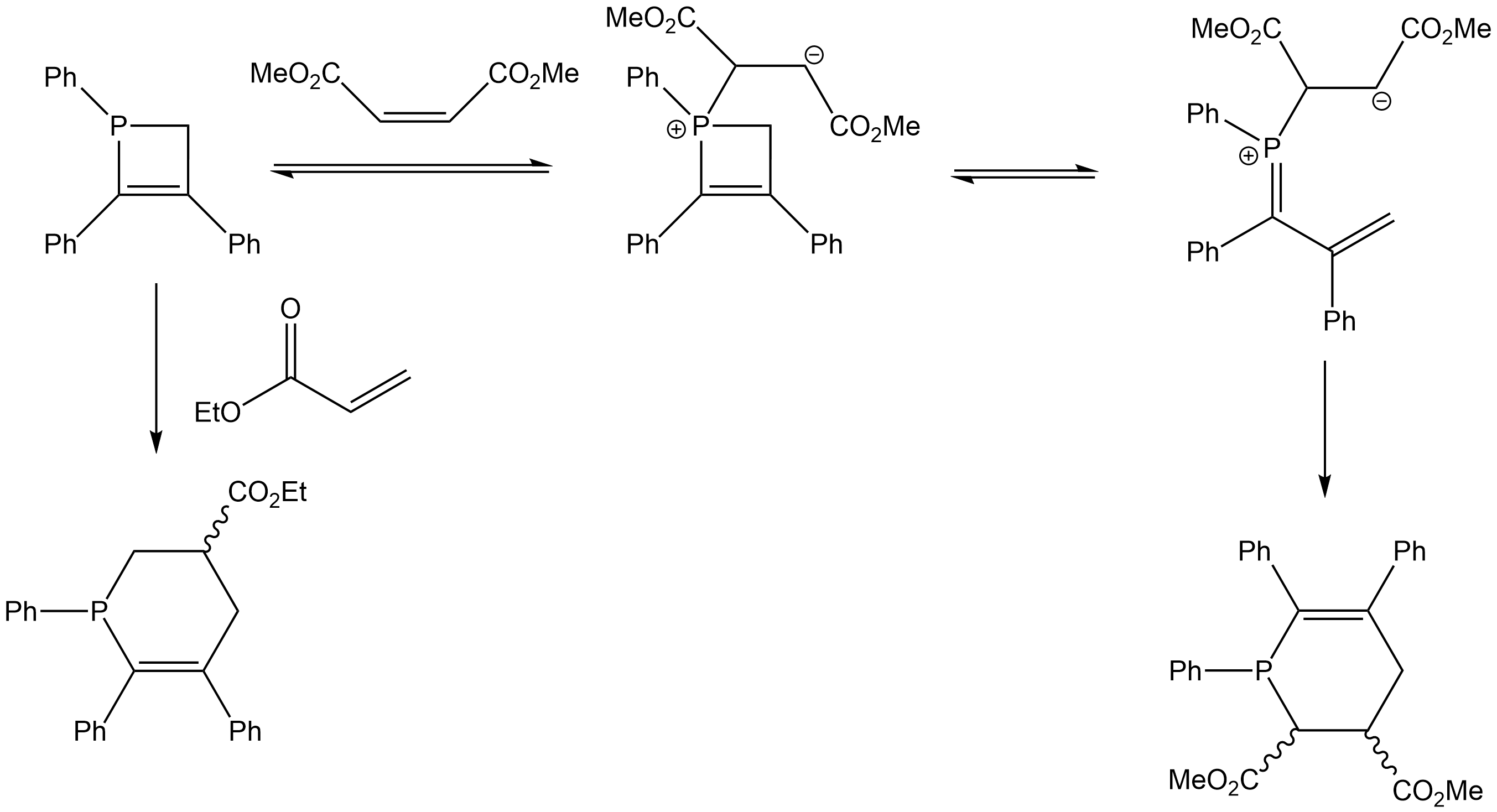
Michael addition reactions of nucleophilic 1,3,4-triphenyl-1,2-dihydrophosphete (Doxsee et al.).

=== Ring expansion ===
Ring strain in four-membered phosphetene rings can be released by ring expansion to five-membered phosphole rings, studied for the incorporation of O, S, Se, and Pt and incorporation of a phosphorus atom.

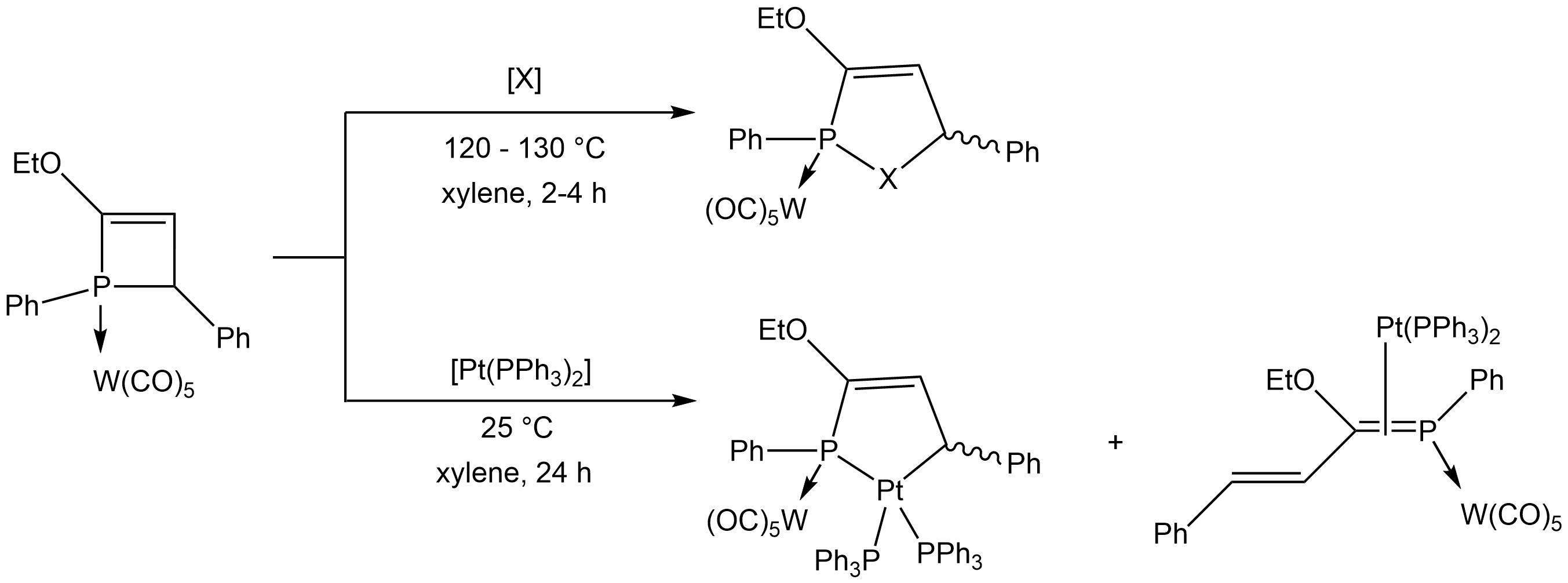
Insertion of S, Se, and Pt into 1,2-dihydrophosphete (Mathey et al.). (X = S, Se)

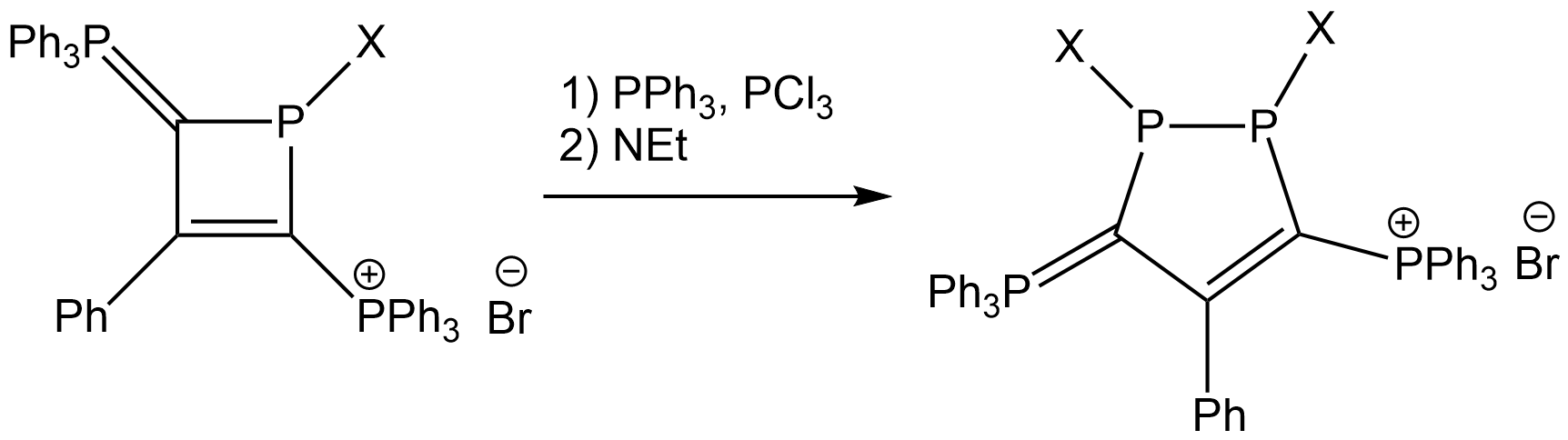
Insertion of phosphorus into 2,4-diphoshino-dihydrophosphetide cations (Schmidtpeter et al.).
