= Borirene =

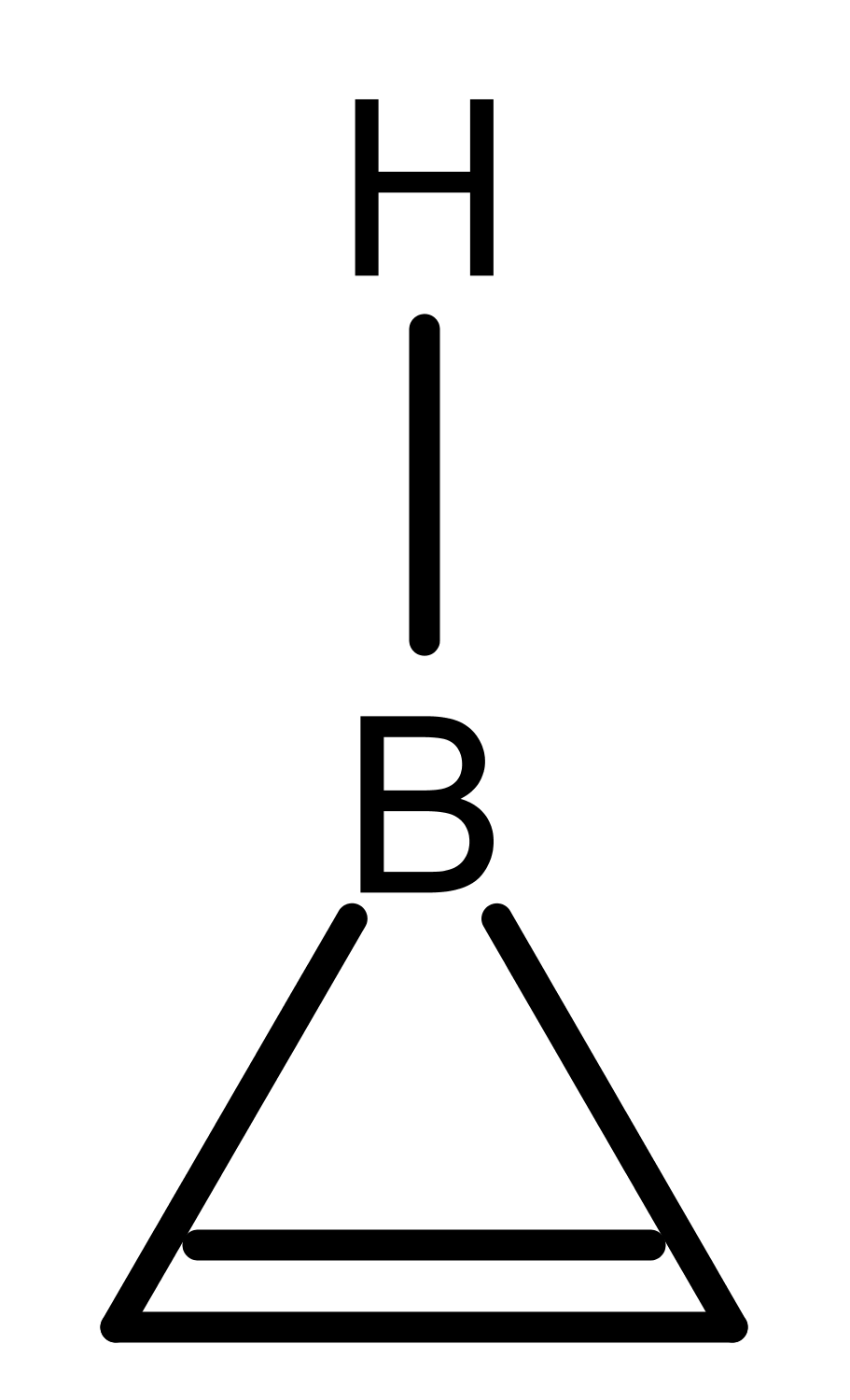

Names
- Other names 1H-Boriren-1-yl

Identifiers
CAS Number	16488-40-7
3D model (JSmol)	Interactive image; 1H-Boriren-1-yl: Interactive image
ChemSpider	21106421
PubChem CID	1H-Boriren-1-yl: 53440538
CompTox Dashboard (EPA)	DTXSID70702645; 1H-Boriren-1-yl: DTXSID70702645
- InChI: InChI=1S/C2H3B/c1-2-3-1/h1-3H Key: UVBXRPNQDJLHAH-UHFFFAOYSA-N; 1H-Boriren-1-yl: InChI=1S/C2H2B/c1-2-3-1/h1-2H Key: OIJTZPGWOYZZSN-UHFFFAOYSA-N
- SMILES: B1C=C1; 1H-Boriren-1-yl: [B]1C=C1

Properties
Chemical formula	C_{2}H_{3}B
Molar mass	37.86 g·mol^{−1}
- Except where otherwise noted, data are given for materials in their standard state (at 25 °C [77 °F], 100 kPa). Infobox references

Borirenes are a unique class of three-membered heterocyclic compounds characterized by an unsaturated boron atom within their ring structure. First computationally predicted by John Pople and Paul von Rague Schleyer in 1981, the simplest borirene, (CH)_{2}BH, is isoelectronic with the cyclopropenium cation and exhibits Hückel aromaticity. Borirenes undergo ring-opening reactions with polar reagents and form Lewis adducts, due to the significant ring strain in its three-membered structure and the presence of an empty p orbital on the boron atom. The balance of these two properties leads to unique properties as a ligand for transition metals, in addition to observation of photochemical rearrangement and ring expansion. While borirenes were first discovered in the 1980s, new derivatives such as benzoborirenes have led to renewed interest in the field, with their potential applications yet to be fully explored.

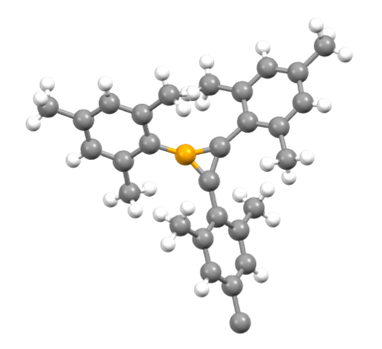
Figure 1. The first reported X-ray crystal structure of trimesitylboracyclopropene, an example of a class of compounds known as borirenes.

== Electronic Structure ==
Both the σ- and π- framework of borirenes contribute significantly to its diverse reactivity. It is best shown by comparing borirenes to the isoelectronic cyclopropenyl cation:

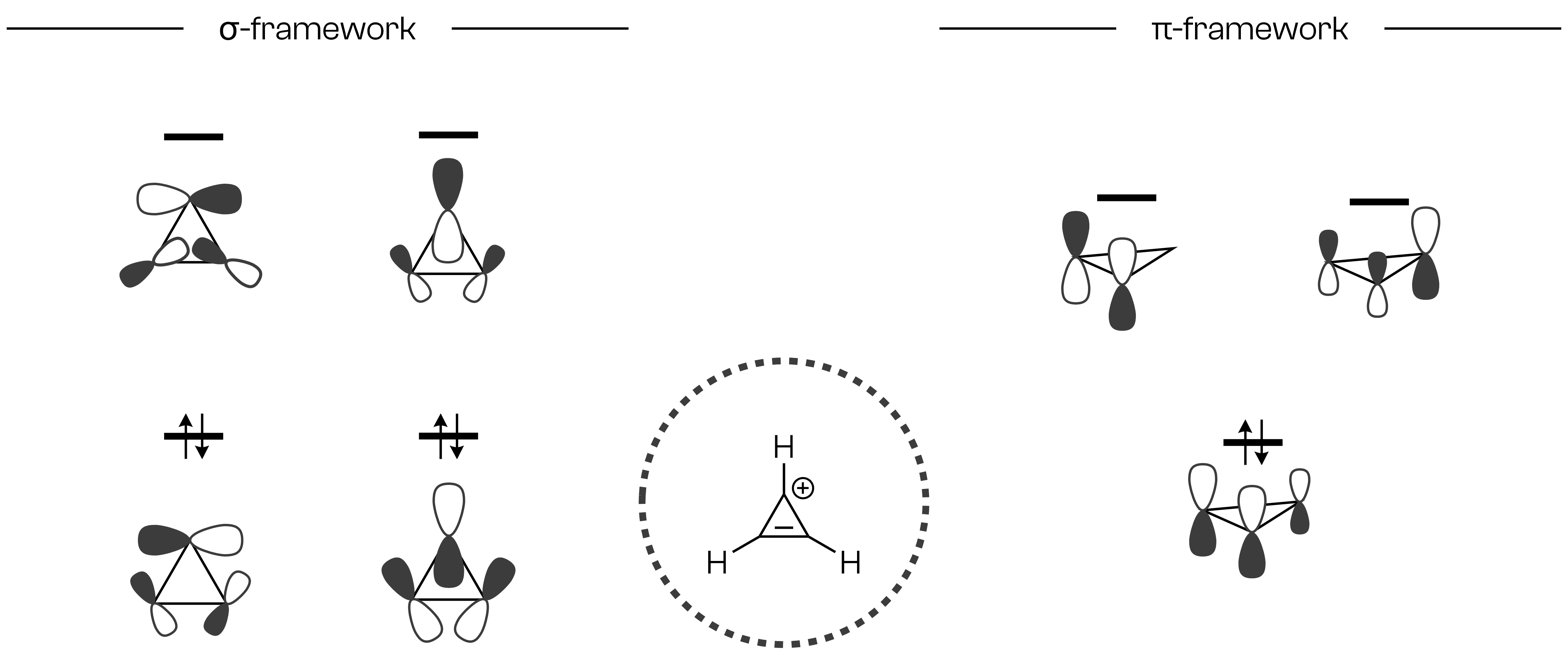
Figure 2. Representation of molecular orbitals and their relative energies of the σ-, π- framework in cyclopropenyl cation. Only the four most relevant MOs of the σ-framework are shown above.

Although 2π Hückel aromaticity stabilizes the π-framework, three-membered ring systems like cyclopropane experience significant ring strain with bond angles of approximately 60°, deviating significantly from the 120° angles typical of sp2-hybridized carbons. This strain limits 2s-2p orbital mixing, and the σ-framework have significant π-character in terms of reactivity. This leads to the energies of both frameworks being relatively close in energy, leading to interesting interactions overall. From the isolobal principle, we can expect the bonding properties to be similar in borirenes:

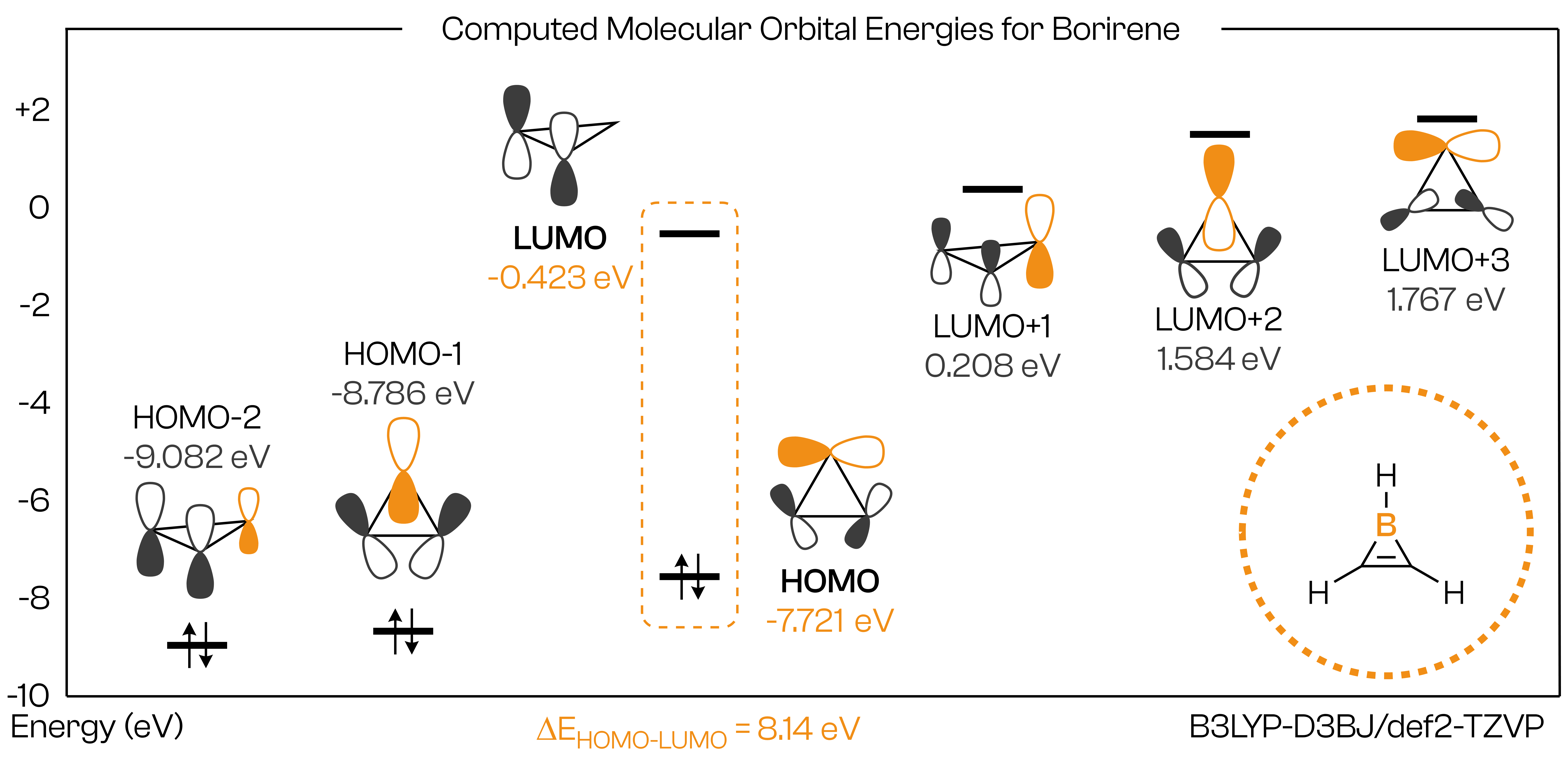
Figure 3. Computed molecular orbital energies of borirene (C2H3B). The molecular orbitals are ordered from lowest energy (left) to highest energy (right). Computed with B3YLP-D3BJ/def2-TZVP level of theory in Orca 6.0.1.

Seven molecular orbitals are depicted in Figure 3. For the simplest borirene, C_{2}H_{3}B, the two highest occupied molecular orbitals (HOMOs) are from the σ-framework, while the two lowest unoccupied molecular orbitals (LUMO) are from the π-framework. Substituting one carbon atom with boron, due to its lower electronegativity, disrupts degeneracy. With σ- and π- orbitals close in energy, the HOMO−1 and HOMO (from the σ-framework) can act as a π-donor and σ-donor, respectively, while the LUMO and LUMO+1 serve as both σ-acceptors and π-acceptors. A detailed computational study on borirenes by Paul von Ragué Schleyer and coworkers have predicted these molecules to undergo facile dimerization into 1,4-diboracyclohexadiene.

The orbital energetics are highly tunable via substituent effects: electron-withdrawing groups lower the HOMO energy, whereas electron-donating groups raise the LUMO energy, as shown in Figure 4. Characterized borirenes to date are stabilized predominantly by electron-rich, strong σ- and π-donor substituents that raise the LUMO and lowers the HOMO energy. Due to their inherent reactivity, sterically demanding groups such as m-terphenyl or mesityl substituents are commonly employed to enhance kinetic stability.

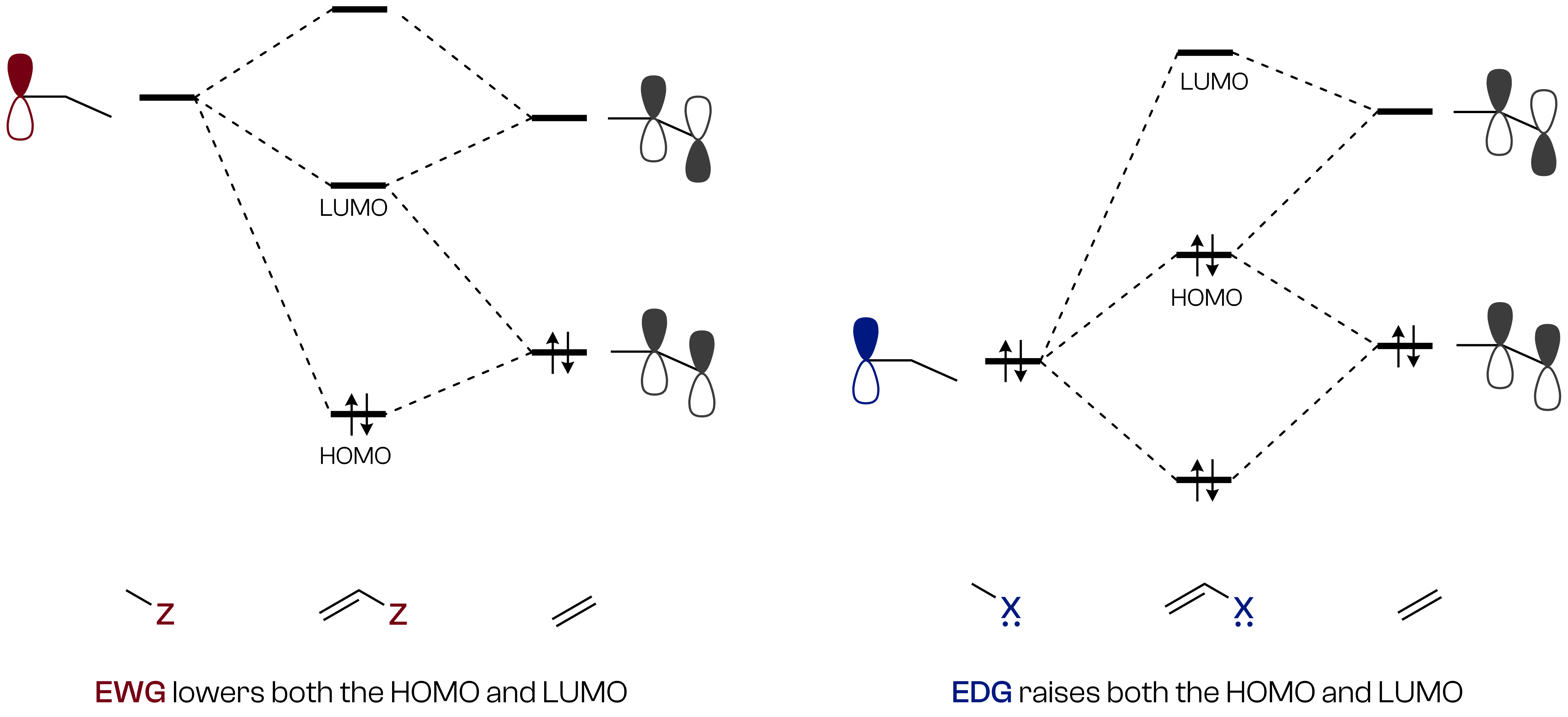
Figure 4. Relative effects of electron-withdrawing groups (EWG) and electron-donating groups (EDG) to a simple alkene. Both EWG and EDG have very similar effects to the σ-framework and π-framework in borirenes.

== Synthesis ==
The simplest borirene, (CH)_{2}BH, which was prepared via a reaction between an atomic boron atom and ethylene, was first identified using matrix isolation spectroscopy by Lanzisera et al. in 1997, and later confirmed with the crossed molecular beam method by Balucani et al. Substituted borirenes are typically prepared starting from an alkyne, and are prepared through either a rearrangement or a borylene pathway as shown in Scheme 1:

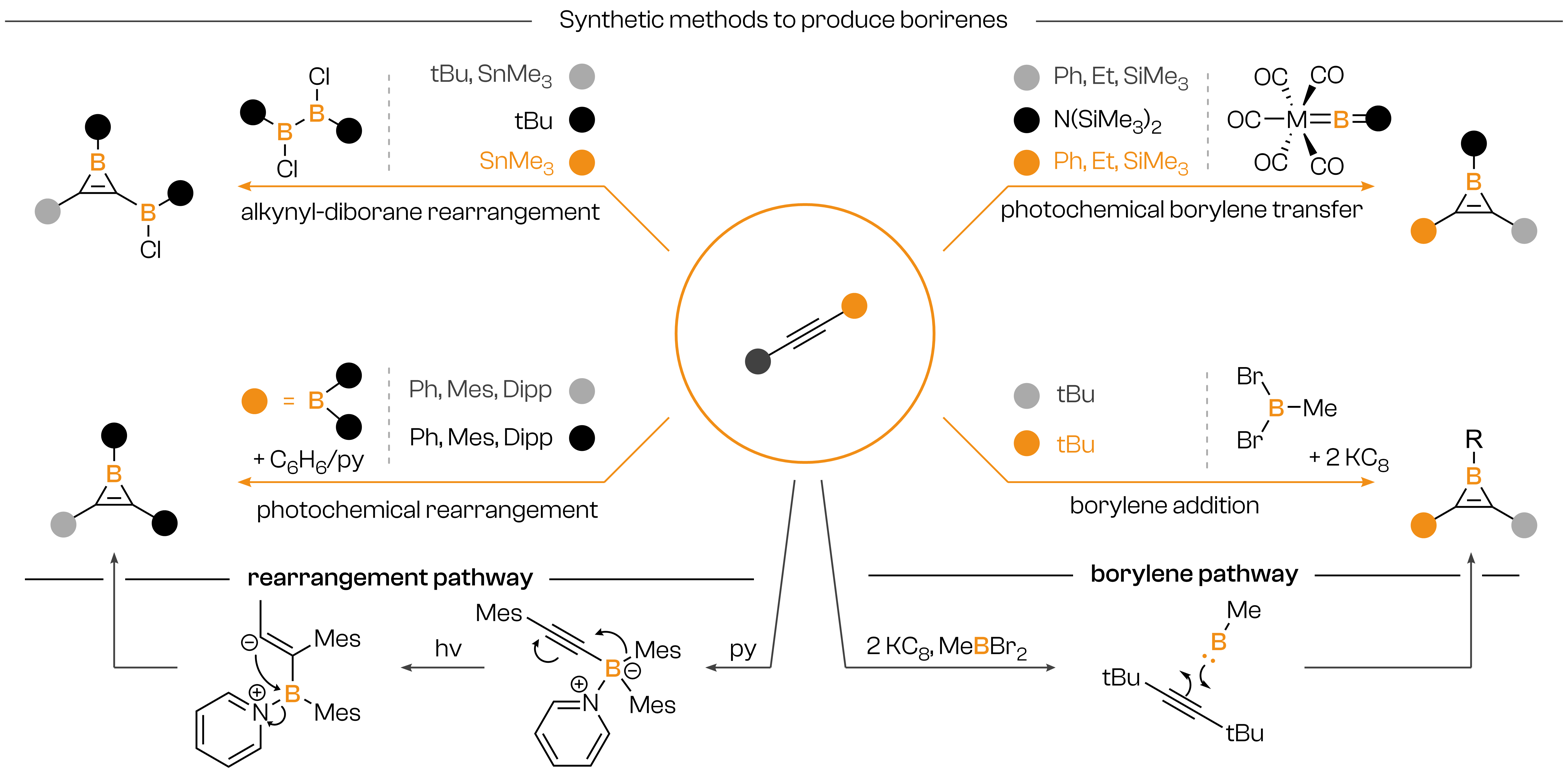
Scheme 1. Currently reported methods in the literature to prepare borylenes. The borylene pathway is accessible by either generating a in situ borylene intermediate or transferring a terminal borylene ligand from an electron-rich metal complex. The rearrangement pathway is accessible by photoinduced rearrangement of an alkynyl-borane or formation of an alkynyl-diborane intermediate. The proposed mechanism shown below are examples of potential mechanisms for the reaction, with the possibility of alternative mechanisms. (Ph = phenyl, tBu = tert-butyl, Dipp = 2,6-diisopropylphenyl, Mes = mesityl)

Borylene addition is a widely utilized method for the synthesis of simple borirenes. The first identification of a substituted borirene was reported by Van Der Kerk et al., achieved through GC-MS analysis of a one-pot reaction involving MeBBr_{2}, KC_{8}, and di-tert-butylacetylene under reflux conditions. The proposed mechanism suggests the formation of a highly reactive methylborylene intermediate, formed via the elimination of two equivalents of potassium bromide. This intermediate subsequently undergoes a [2+1] cycloaddition with the alkyne precursor, leading to the formation of the borirene framework. Similarly, a photochemical approach utilizing tris(triphenylsilyl)borane as a precursor has been reported, wherein a highly reactive silylborylene intermediate reacts with bis(trimethylsilyl)acetylene to form analogous products. This synthetic pathway is limited by the stability of the starting materials when exposed to strong reducing agents, the inherent instability of the borylene intermediate, and low yields.

An alternative and milder route to prepare borirenes involve the use of terminal borylene complexes, which are able to efficiently transfer the borylene moiety to alkynes under photolytic conditions. Electron-rich complexes such as [(OC)_{5}Cr=BX] have emerged as key reagents in this context and have been extensively studied by Braunschweig and co-workers.

Borirenes can also be synthesized by rearranging internal alkynes bonded directly to boron substituents. For instance, alkyl-substituted diboranes react with trimethylstannylalkynes to form alkynyl-diborane intermediates, which quickly rearrange into borirene products. Alternatively, photoinduced rearrangement of alkynyl-boranes provides another efficient pathway for borirene synthesis.

== Reactivity ==
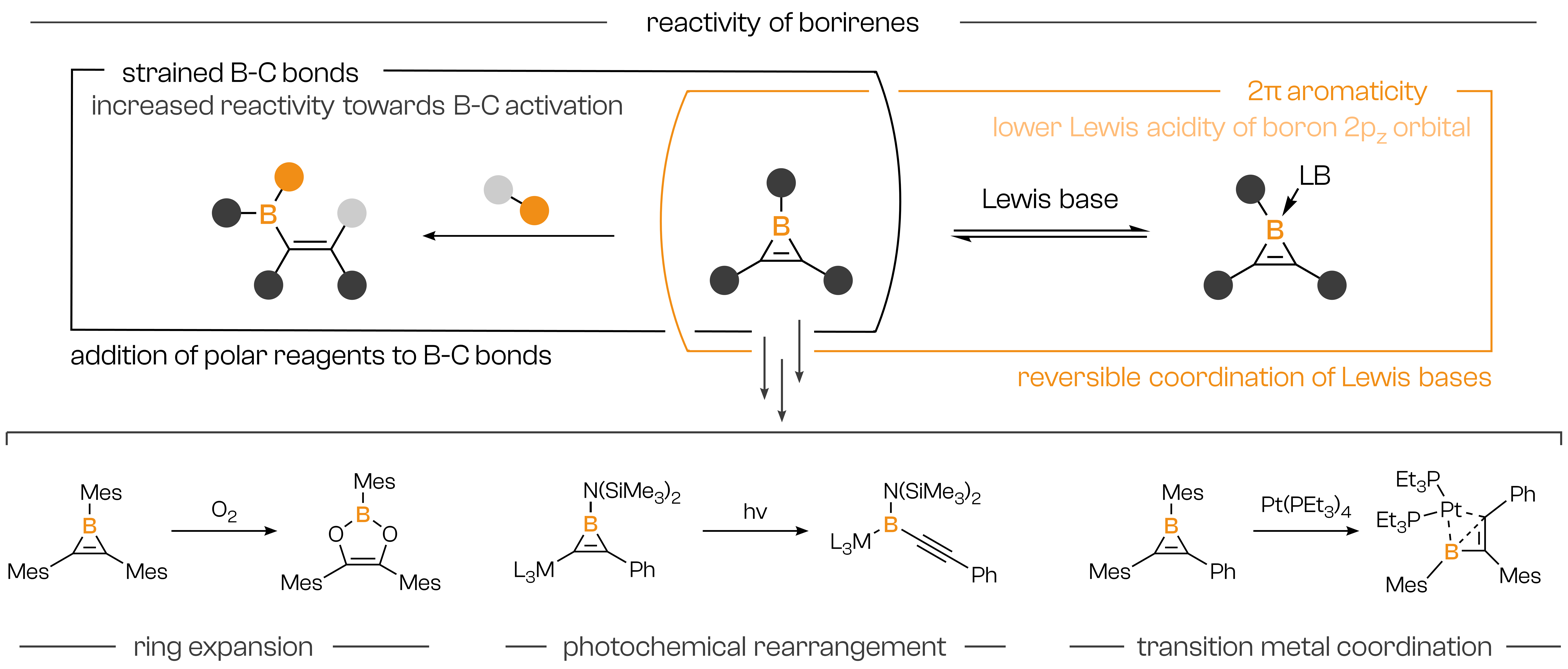
Scheme 2. General reactivity of borirenes currently described in the literature. (Mes = 1,3,5-trimethylphenyl)

Similar to other tricoordinate boron compounds, borirenes readily form Lewis adducts. Strong Lewis bases like N-heterocyclic carbenes (NHCs) bind efficiently to borirenes but can be displaced by introducing stronger Lewis acids, such as tris(pentafluorophenyl)borane. Pyridine has also been shown to bind reversibly to borirenes, illustrating the milder Lewis acidity of borirenes due to the aromatic π-framework. In cases where the boron atom is directly bonded to a metal fragment capable of functioning as a leaving group—such as FeCp*(CO)_{2}—two equivalents of NHCs can displace the metal fragment, resulting in a formally positively charged tetracoordinate boron center, with [FeCp*(CO)_{2}]^{−} acting as the counteranion.

Similar to other highly strained cyclic molecules like cyclopropanes, the significant π-character of the σ−framework enables borirenes to undergo ring-opening reactions. Polar reagents, such as hydrogen chloride (HCl) and alcohols (HOR), readily cleave the B–C bond, with the more electropositive component bonding to carbon. With the frontier orbitals of borirenes being characterized by a HOMO dominated by the σ-framework and a LUMO dominated by the π-framework, this facilitates not only ring-opening reactions and Lewis adduct formation but also other transformations, such as photoinduced rearrangements and coordination as ligands to transition metals. As shown in Scheme 2, when an electron-rich metal fragment is bonded to one of the carbon atoms of the borirene, photoinduced rearrangement can occur to yield alkynyl-boranes. Despite their inherent reactivity, substituted borirenes exhibit remarkable thermal stability, tolerating temperatures up to 200 °C. However, they slowly decompose in oxygen, regenerating the original alkyne starting material and yielding trace amounts of a five-membered ring-expansion product, dioxaborole, as detected by GC-MS.

== Potential Ligand Properties ==
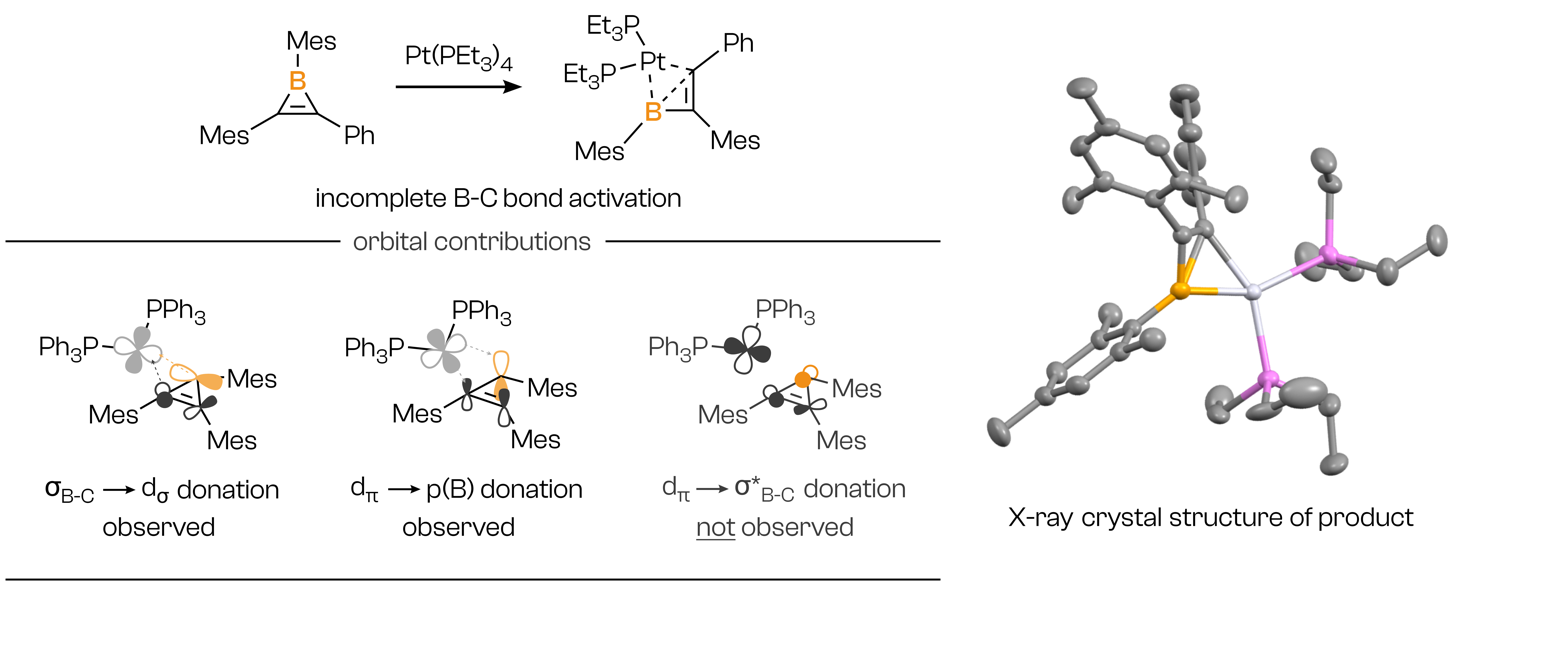
Scheme 3. Preparation of the platinum complex with supported B-C σ coordination. (Mes = 1,3,5-trimethylphenyl, Ph = phenyl)

Borirenes exhibit promising potential as ligands. For example, introducing an electron-rich metal complex, such as tetrakis(triethylphosphine)platinum(0), to a borylene complex induces B–C σ-bond coordination instead of cleavage. This is shown in Scheme 3. The platinum fragment benefits from strong σ- and π-donation from the σ-framework and moderate π-acceptance from the π-framework. Notably, no d_{π}−σ*_{B-C} interaction is observed, indicating that B−C bond activation is unfavorable.

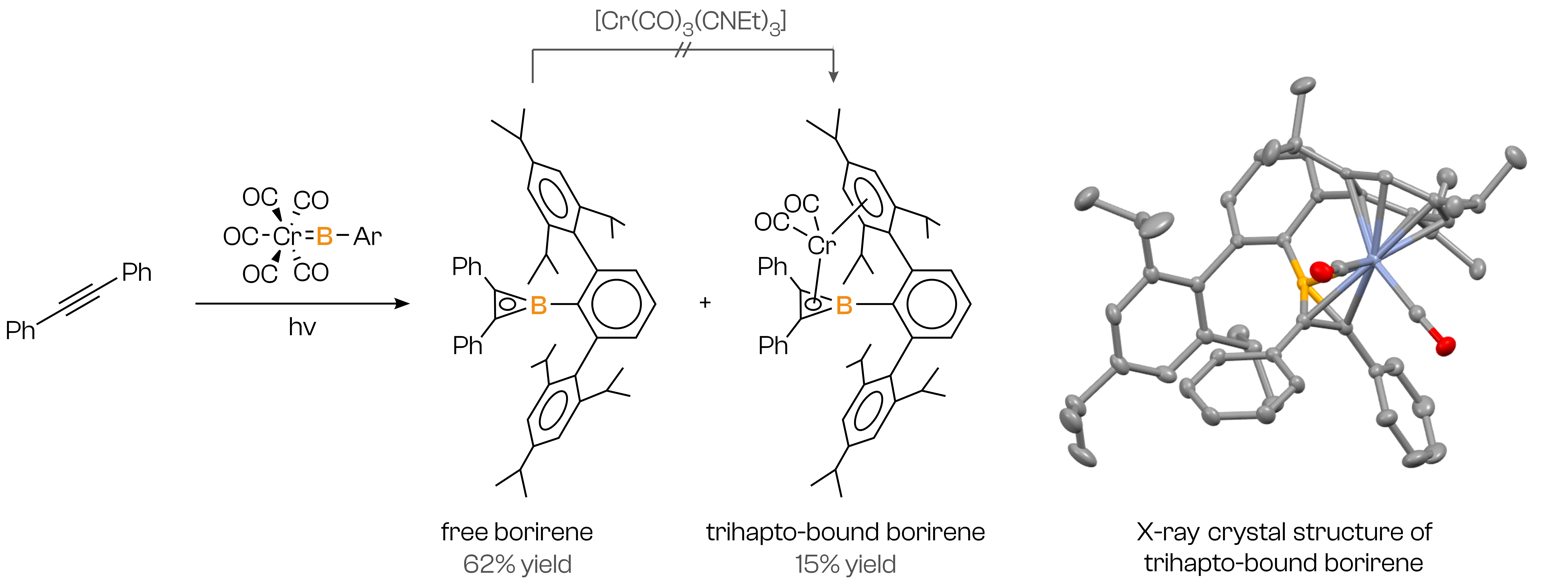
Scheme 4. Borylene transfer to diphenylacetylene using a chromium carbonyl complex with a terminal borylene ligand. Free borirene and η3-bound borirene was reported to form in a 4:1 ratio. The authors also noted that the η^{3}-bound borirene could not be made with addition of [Cr(CO)_{3}(CNEt)_{3}]. The X-ray crystal structure of the η^{3}-bound borirene was also reported.

Braunschweig and coworkers further demonstrated the potential of borirenes as ligands. Reacting diphenylacetylene with a terminal borylene complex, as shown in Scheme 4, produced both a free borirene and an η^{3}-bound chromium-borirene complex in a 4:1 ratio. The authors proposed that the η^{3}-bound chromium-borirene complex acts as an intermediate in the borylene-transfer process.

Computational investigations further highlight the distinct electronic properties of borirene ligands. Comparing the model complex (1,3,5-triisopropylbenzene)Cr(CO)_{3} with the minor product, energy decomposition analysis (EDA) revealed a ~1.6-fold increase in key parameters—attractive electrostatic interactions, orbital interactions, and repulsive Pauli interactions— indicating that borirene is a stronger ligand than CO.

== Benzoborirenes ==
Scheme 5. Synthesis and reactivity of characterized benzoborirene compounds. (NHC = N-heterocyclic compound, Mes* = 1,3,5-tri-tert-butylphenyl, Ar = aromatic ring)

Benzoborirenes represent a novel and highly reactive class of borirene derivatives, where the borirene ring is fused to a benzene ring via a shared C=C bond. DFT calculations suggest that the local aromaticity of the borirene unit in benzoborirene is comparable to that of the parent borirene. However, this fusion introduces significant ring strain due to structural deformation of the benzene ring in an anti-Mills-Nixon fashion, resulting in shorter C=C bonds in the fused atoms. This strain also enhances the inherent Lewis acidity of the boron center.

The fleeting benzoborirene was first detected experimentally as an intermediate by Bettinger and coworkers in 2002. In 2018, the Bettinger group characterized the first stable benzoborirene compound using NMR spectroscopy, identifying an NHC-stabilized benzoborirene that rapidly dimerizes to form an NHC-stabilized 9,10-diboraanthracene. Notably, dimerization can be avoided by stabilizing the boron center with bulky, electron-rich groups.

In 2020, the Ye group advanced the field by synthesizing a benzoborirene stabilized with bis(trimethylsilyl)amine (HMDS) using Cp_{2}ZrPh_{2} and HMDSBBr_{2} as key reagents. Their foundings revealed that benzoborirenes exhibit distinct reactivity compared to borirenes. Strong donors, such as isonitriles and N-heterocyclic carbenes, induced ring-expansion and ring-opening reactions, respectively, diverging from the typical Lewis adduct formation observed for borirenes.

In 2022, the Bettinger group synthesized a m-terphenyl-stabilized benzoborirene and conducted detailed reactivity studies. Consistent with their heightened reactivity, benzoborirenes were found to form Lewis adducts only with weak ligands such as pyridine. Methanol, as observed with borirenes, induced ring-opening reactions. More complex transformations were observed with phosphine oxides, aldehydes, and isonitriles, which triggered ring-expansion reactions, leading to the formation of five-membered boron heterocyclic species. Two years later in 2024, the Bettinger group expanded on the reactivity of benzoborienes by showing its potential to undergo formal (2+2) ring expansions, as shown in Scheme 6. This contrasts the reactivity shown by cyclopropa[b]naphthalene, which can be considered an all-carbon analogue of the benzoborirene, which are known to undergo formal [4+2] and [4+2] cycloaddition reactions with highly reactive dienophiles, such as 4,-phenyl-1,2,4-triazoline-3,5-dione (PTAD) and 3,6-di-(4-pyridyl)-1,2,4,5-tetrazine (4,4'-bptz).

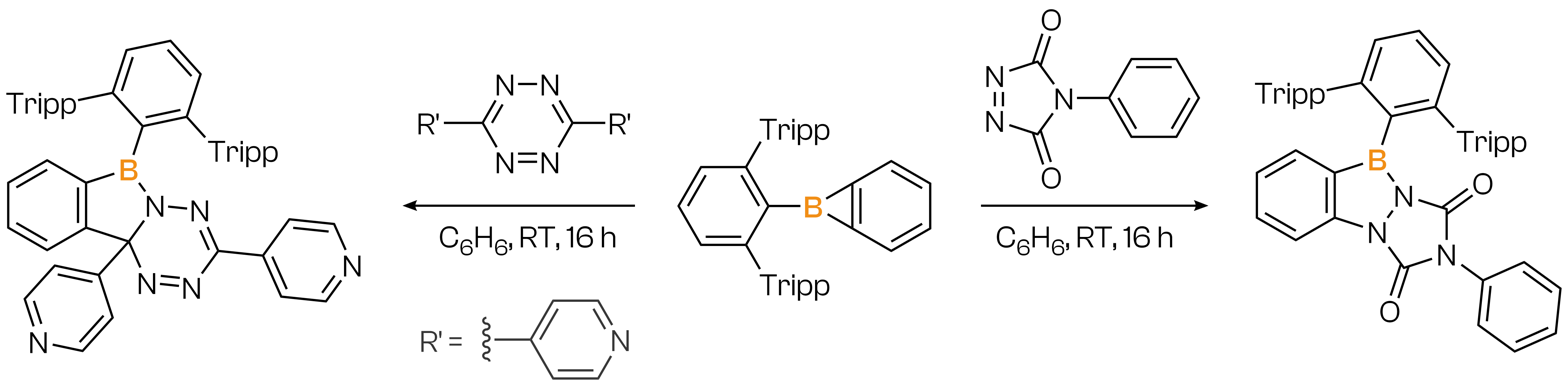
Scheme 6. Formal (2+2) ring expansions with strong nitrogen-based dienophiles and benzoborirenes, conducted by Bettinger and coworkers. (Tripp = 1,3,5-triisopropylphenyl)
