= Phosphirene =

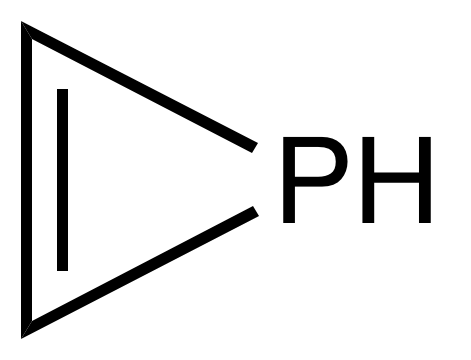

Names
- Preferred IUPAC name 1H-Phosphirene
- Systematic IUPAC name Phosphacyclopropene

Identifiers
CAS Number	157-19-7
3D model (JSmol)	Interactive image
ChemSpider	24771513
PubChem CID	15786925
- InChI: InChI=1S/C2H3P/c1-2-3-1/h1-3H Key: BHJIMPINIQQPJX-UHFFFAOYSA-N
- SMILES: C1=CP1

Properties
Chemical formula	C_{2}H_{3}P
Molar mass	58.020 g·mol^{−1}
- Except where otherwise noted, data are given for materials in their standard state (at 25 °C [77 °F], 100 kPa). Infobox references

Phosphirene is the hypothetical organophosphorus compound with the formula C_{2}H_{2}PH. As the simplest cyclic, unsaturated organophosphorus compound, phosphirene is the prototype of a family of related compounds that have attracted attention from researchers.

Phosphirenes, that is substituted phosphirene compounds where one or more of the H's are replaced by organic substituents, are far more commonly discussed than the parent phosphirene. The first example of a phosphirene, 1,2,3-triphenylphosphirene was prepared via trapping of the phosphinidine complex Mo(CO)_{5}PPh with diphenylacetylene.

Placement of the double bond between the carbon atoms provides a 1Hphosphirene in which the phosphorus center is bonded to two carbon atoms and a hydrogen atom. Alternatively, placement of the double bond between the phosphorus center and a carbon atom generates a 2H-phosphirene. The first 2H-phosphirene was synthesized as early as 1987 by Regitz group. However, the chemistry of 2H-phosphirenes was relatively dormant until a series of reports by Stephan group.
