= C8H9N =

The molecular formula C_{8}H_{9}N (molar mass: 119.167 g/mol) may refer to:

- Azonine
- 2,3-Cyclopentapyridine
- 3,4-Cyclopentapyridine
- 4,7-Dihydroisoindole
- Indoline
- Isoindoline
