= Tetraanthraporphyrin =

Extended porphyrin

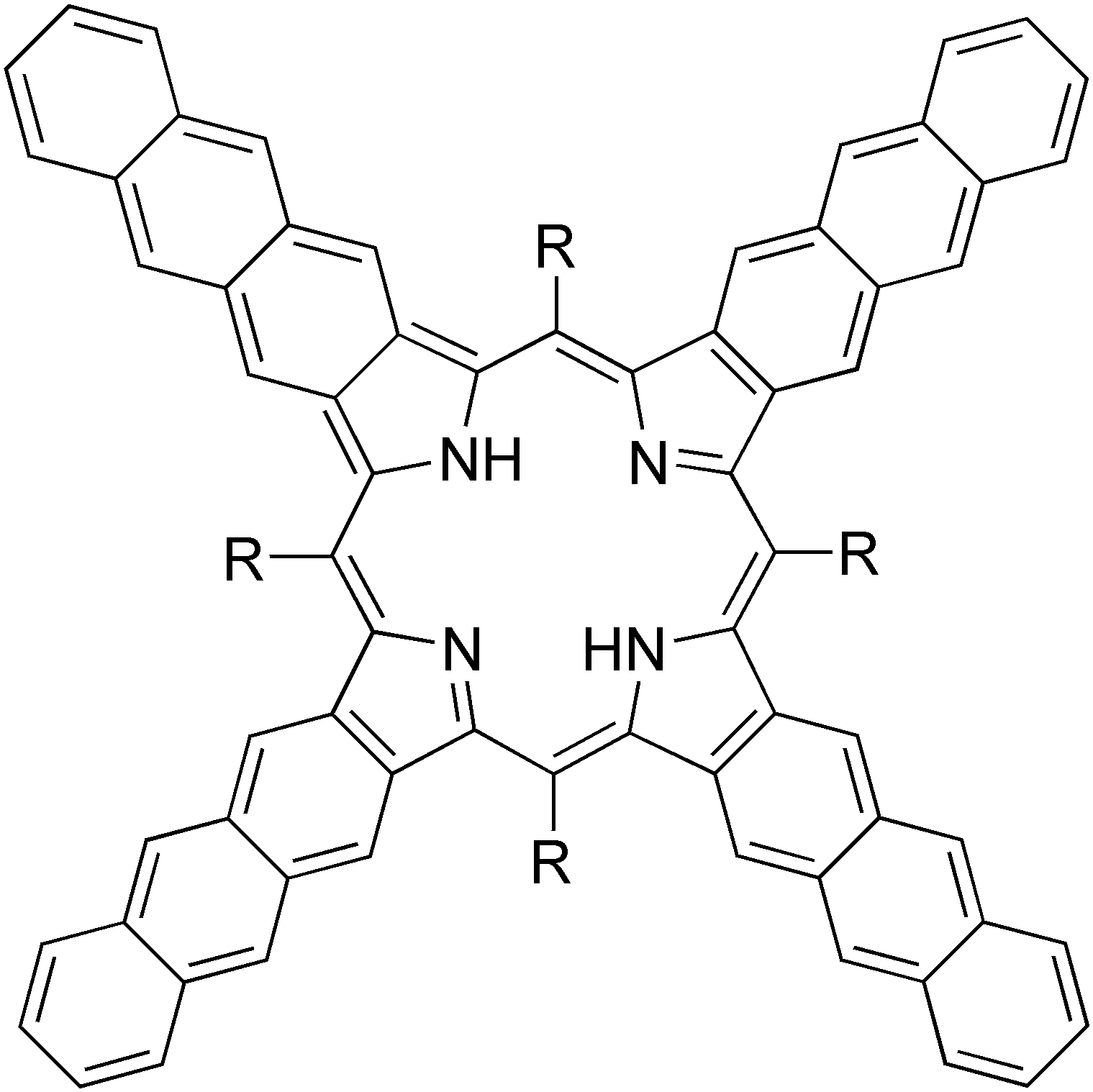
Tetraanthraporphyrin structure

Tetraanthraporphyrin, or tetraanthra[2,3]porphyrin (TAP), is a representative of extended porphyrins. Despite promising properties, tetraanthraporphyrins have until recently been little studied. As was theoretically predicted, extension of pi-electronic system results in the case of TAPs in the destabilization of the third LUMOs and the first HOMOs that makes it unstable against oxidation and reduction.

== Synthesis ==
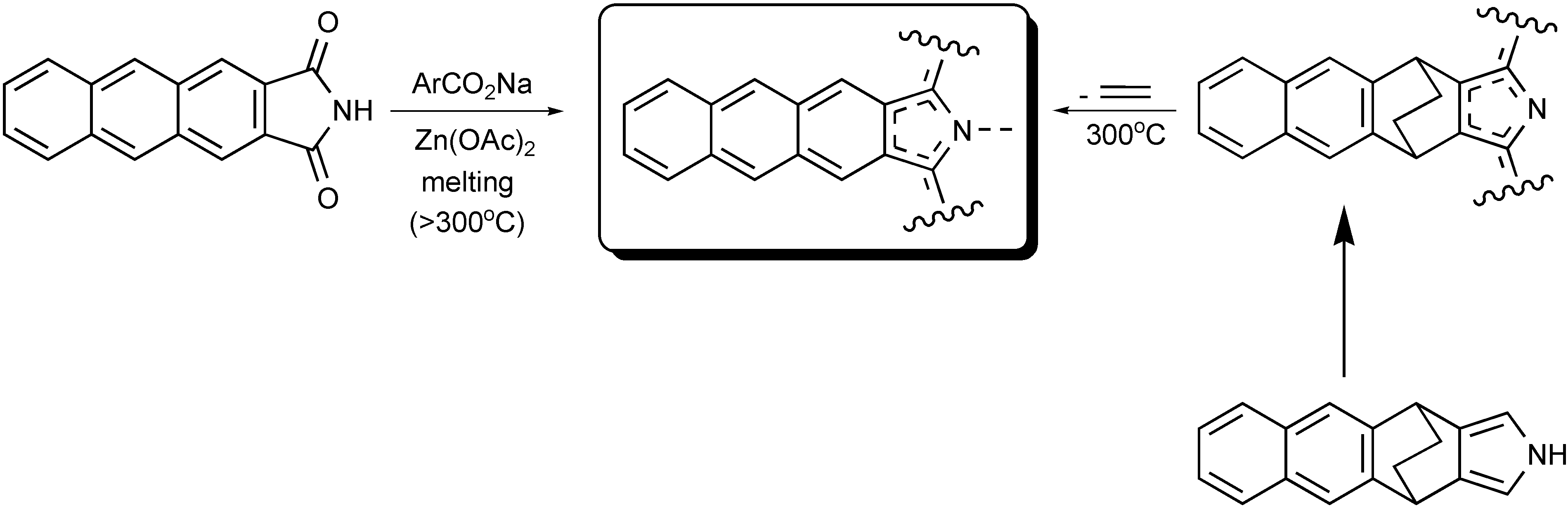
Synthesis of TAPs using high-temperature template condensation (left) thermal retro-Diels-Alder method (right)

The first representative of the TAP family was prepared by Kobayashi and co-workers, using high-temperature template condensation method, which resembles the classical procedures of phthalocyanine synthesis. Melting of anthracene-2,3- dicarboxyimide with sodium biphenylacetate in the presence of zinc acetate resulted in the formation of zinc complex of triarylsubstituted TAP. The synthesis of both meso-unsubstituted and meso-arylsubstituted TAPs was reported by Ono and coworkers using a common approach to extended porphyrins relying on thermal retro-Diels−Alder extrusion of ethylene from bicyclo[2.2.2]octadiene-annelated porphyrins. Thus obtained materials were reported to be poorly soluble and unstable toward photooxidation. An obvious drawback of reported syntheses of TAPs is a need for harsh conditions of condensation or aromatization steps, which are poorly compatible with the emerging huge and fragile TAP system. This results in low yields and poor quality of the obtained materials and limits opportunities of introducing functionality to improve solubility and stability or to modulate optical properties.

As an advanced method delivering tetraanthraporphyrins, the dihydroisoindole method based on an oxidative aromatization of the closest partially hydrogenated porphyrin precursor was applied. It warrants that the conditions of aromatization of the annelated system are as soft as possible and occur spontaneously along with the aromatization of the porphyrinogen intermediates

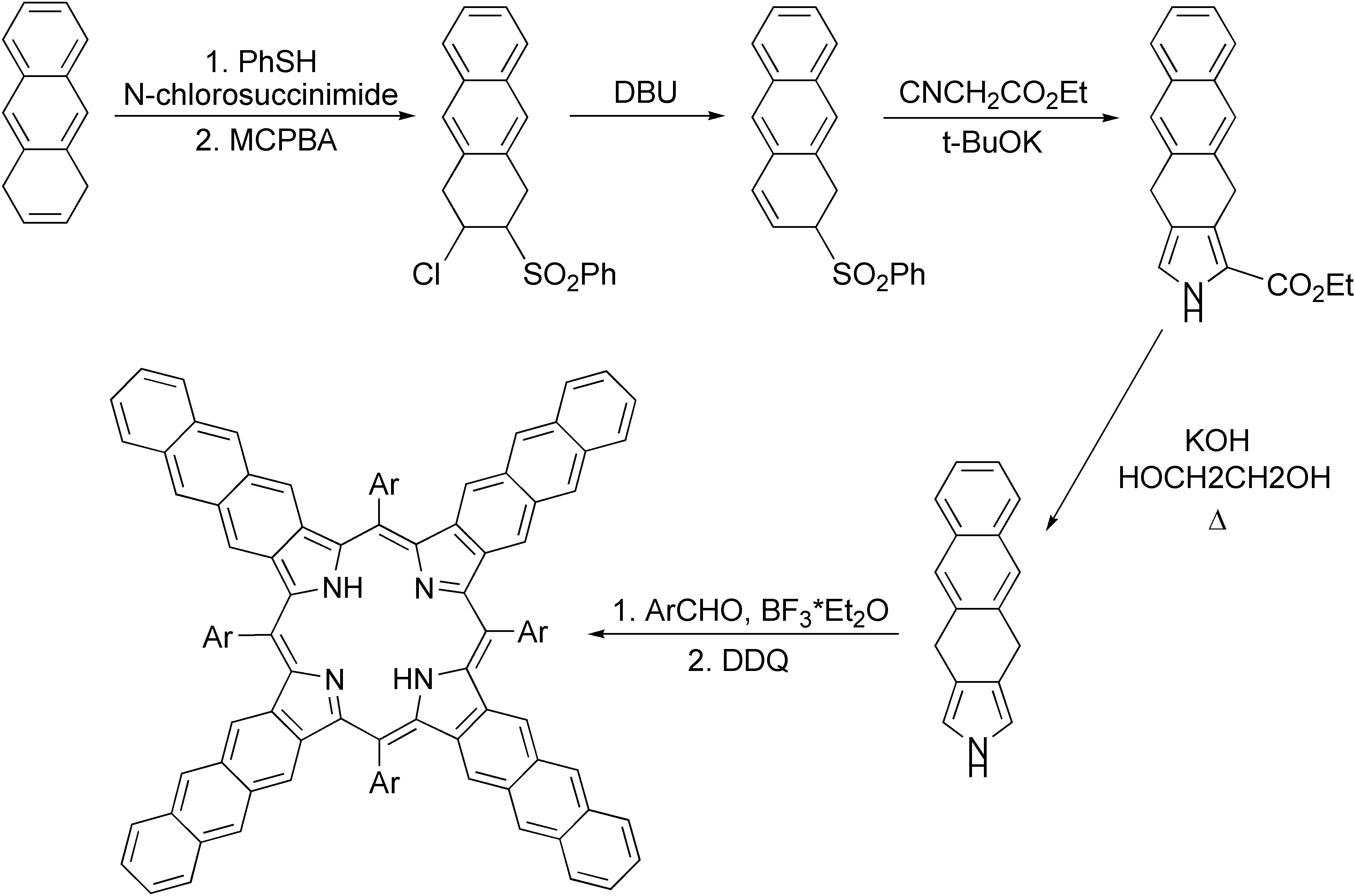
Synthesis of tetraanthraporphyrin following dihydroisoindole approach

== Structure ==
Tetraanthraporphyrin X-ray structure

The geometry of TAP like all known geometries of tetraarylporphyrins is distorted to take a very characteristic "saddle" shape.

== Optical properties ==
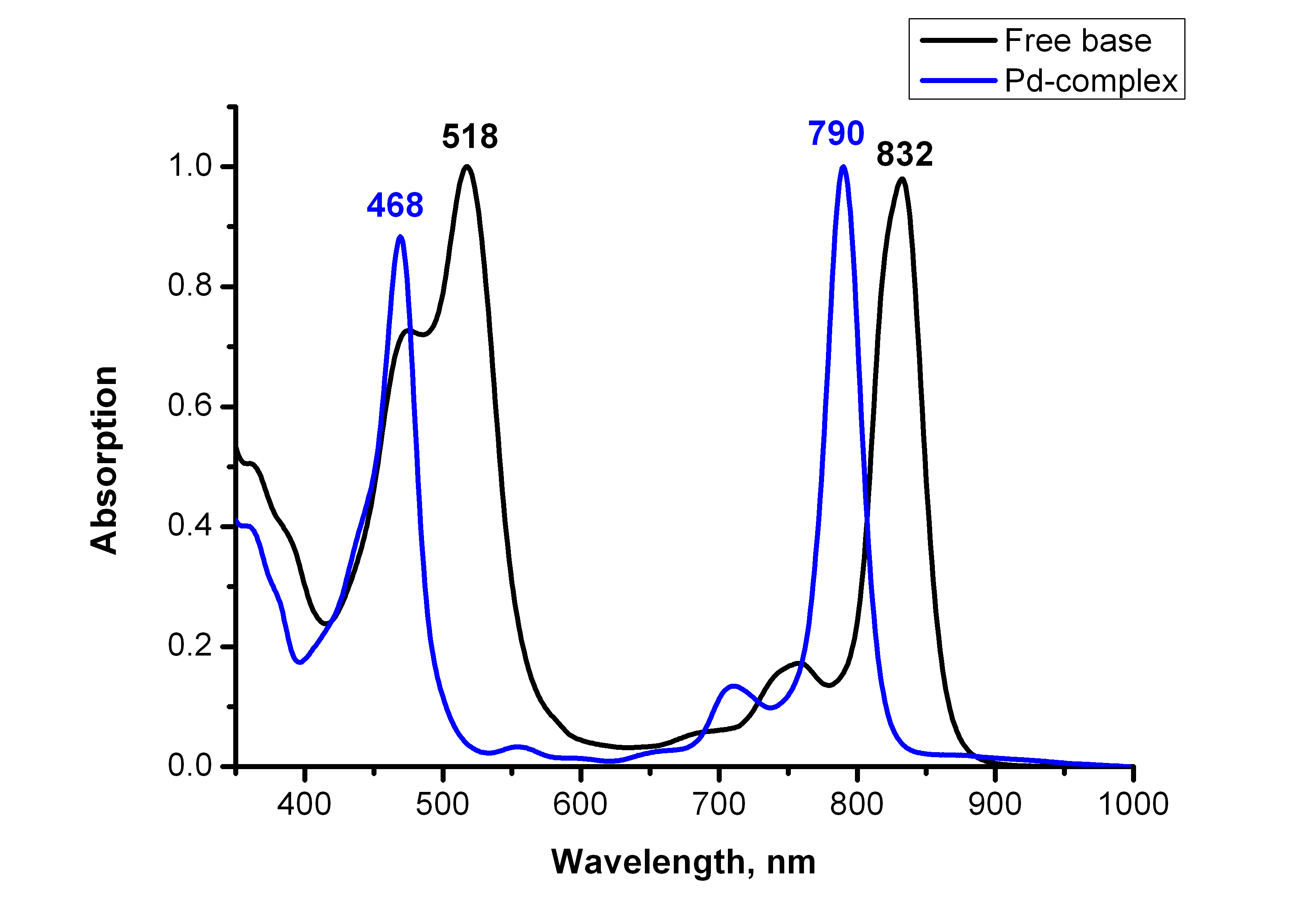
Absorption spectra of tetraanthraporphyrin and it's Pd(II) complex

Tetraanthraporphyrin exhibit strongly red-shifted and hyperchromic absorption bands. The maximum of absorption is about 830 nm. The molar extinction coefficients reach 10^{−5} scale. Very strong red-shift of absorption by about 90 nm upon protonation of nitrogen atoms and blue-shift by 20−40 nm upon metal insertion are observed.
