= Inverse electron-demand Diels–Alder reaction =

Reaction impacting chemical bonds

Prototypical DA_{INV} reaction between an electron-poor diene (acrolein) and an electron-rich dienophile (methyl vinyl ether). Bonds made and broken are labelled blue and red, respectively.

The inverse electron demand Diels–Alder reaction, or DA_{INV} or IEDDA is an organic chemical reaction, in which two new chemical bonds and a six-membered ring are formed. It is related to the Diels–Alder reaction, but unlike the Diels–Alder (or DA) reaction, the DA_{INV} is a cycloaddition between an electron-rich dienophile and an electron-poor diene. During a DA_{INV} reaction, three pi-bonds are broken, and two sigma bonds and one new pi-bond are formed. A prototypical DA_{INV} reaction is shown on the right.

DA_{INV} reactions often involve heteroatoms, and can be used to form heterocyclic compounds. This makes the DA_{INV} reaction particularly useful in natural product syntheses, where the target compounds often contain heterocycles. Recently, the DA_{INV} reaction has been used to synthesize a drug transport system which targets prostate cancer.

== History ==
The Diels–Alder reaction was first reported in 1928 by Otto Diels and Kurt Alder; they were awarded the Nobel Prize in chemistry for their work in 1950. Since that time, use of the Diels–Alder reaction has become widespread. Conversely, DA_{INV} does not have a clear date of inception, and lacks the comparative prominence of the standard Diels-Alder reaction. DA_{INV} does not have a clear date of discovery, because of the difficulty that chemists had in differentiating normal from inverse electron-demand Diels-Alder reactions before the advent of modern computational methods. Much of the work in this area is attributed to Dale Boger, though other authors have published numerous papers on the subject.

== Mechanism ==
=== Formal mechanism ===
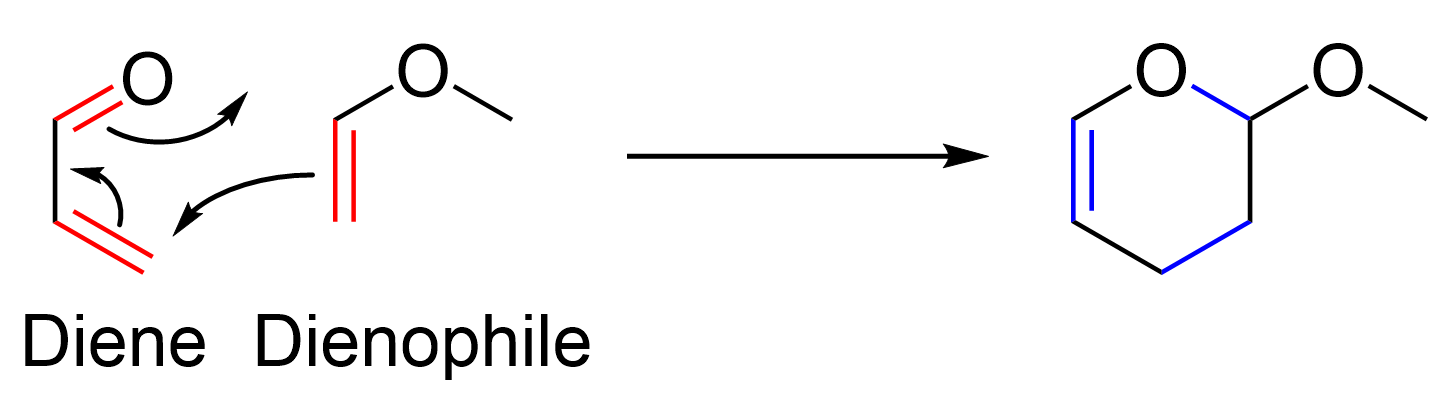
Arrow pushing mechanism of DA_{INV}. Bonds broken are labelled in red; bonds made are labelled in blue.

The mechanism of the DA_{INV} reaction is controversial. While it is accepted as a formal [4+2] cycloaddition, it is not well understood whether or not the reaction is truly concerted. The accepted view is that most DA_{INV} reactions occur via an asynchronous mechanism. The reaction proceeds via a single transition state, but not all bonds are formed or broken at the same time, as would be the case in a concerted mechanism.

The formal DA_{INV} mechanism for the reaction of acrolein and methyl vinyl ether is shown in the figure to the right. Though not entirely accurate, it provides a useful model for the reaction. During the course of the reaction, three pi-bonds (labeled with red) are broken, and three new bonds are formed (labeled in blue): two sigma bonds and one new pi-bond.

=== Transition state ===
Like the standard DA, DA_{INV} reactions proceed via a single boat transition state, despite not being concerted. The single boat transition state is a simplification, but DFT calculations suggest

The DA_{INV} reaction proceeds through a boat transition state, with the diene and dienophile approaching on parallel planes.

that the time difference in bond scission and formation is minimal, and that despite potential asynchronicity, the reaction is concerted, with relevant bonds being either partially broken or partially formed at some point during the reaction. The near synchronicity of the DA_{INV} means it can be treated similarly to the standard Diels-Alder reaction.

The reaction can be modeled using a closed, boat-like transition state, with all bonds being in the process of forming or breaking at some given point, and therefore must obey the Woodward–Hoffman general selection rules. This means that for a three component, six electron system, all components must interact in a suprafacial manner (or one suprafacial and two antarfacial). With all components being suprafacial, the allowed transition state is boat-like; a chair-like transition state would result in three two-electron antarafacial components. The chair-like case is thermally disallowed by the Woodward-Hoffman rules.

== Molecular orbital theory ==
=== Standard DA reactions ===
In the standard Diels-Alder reaction, there are two components: the diene, which is electron rich, and the dienophile, which is electron poor. The relative electron-richness and electron deficiency of the reactants can best be described visually, in a molecular orbital diagram. In the standard Diels–Alder, the electron rich diene has molecular orbitals that are higher in energy than the orbitals of the electron poor dienophile. This difference in relative orbital energies means that, of the frontier molecular orbitals the HOMO of the diene (HOMO_{diene}) and the LUMO of the dienophile (LUMO_{dienophile}) are more similar in energy than the HOMO_{dienophile} and the LUMO_{diene}. The strongest orbital interaction is between the most similar frontier molecular orbitals: HOMO_{diene} and LUMO_{dienophile}.

Generic molecular orbital diagram for the standard DA reaction. The HOMO_{diene} and LUMO_{dienophile} are the closest pair of frontier molecular orbitals, and that those two interact to form the new orbital in the transition state.

=== [4+2] dimerization reactions ===
Dimerization reactions are neither normally or inversely accelerated, and are usually low yielding. In this case, two monomers react in a DA fashion. Because the orbital energies are identical, there is no preference for interaction of the HOMO or the LUMO of either the diene or dienophile. The low yield of dimerization reactions is explained by second-order perturbation theory. The LUMO and HOMO of each species are farther apart in energy in a dimerization than in either normally or inversely accelerated Diels–Alder. This means that the orbitals interact less, and there is a lower thermodynamic drive for dimerization.

FMO diagram for the DA dimerization of acrolein. The FMO overlap is relatively poor, due to the large difference in orbital energies.

=== Diels–Alder with inverse electron demand ===
In the dimerization reactions, the diene and dienophile were equally electron rich (or equally electron poor). If the diene becomes any less electron rich, or the dienophile any more so, the possible [4+2] cycloaddition reaction will then be a DA_{INV} reaction. In the DA_{INV} reaction, the LUMO_{diene} and HOMO_{dienophile} are closer in energy than the HOMO_{diene} and LUMO_{dienophile}. Thus, the LUMO_{diene} and HOMO_{dienophile} are the frontier orbitals that interact the most strongly, and result in the most energetically favourable bond formation.

In DA_{INV}, the LUMO_{diene} and HOMO_{dienophile} are very close in energy, which results in a strong bonding interaction between the two.

== Regiochemistry and stereochemistry of DA_{INV} ==
=== Regiochemistry ===
Regiochemistry in DA_{INV} reactions can be reliably predicted in many cases. This can be done one of two ways, either by electrostatic (charge) control, or orbital control. To predict the regiochemistry via charge control, one must consider the resonance forms of the reactants. These resonance forms can be used to assign partial charges to each of the atoms. Partially negative atoms on the diene will bond to partially positive atoms on the dienophile, and vice versa.

Using the DA_{INV} reaction of acrolein and methyl vinyl ether as an example, the regiochemical outcome of the DA_{INV} reaction can often be predicted. Resonance contributors of each molecule can be used to assign partial positive charges. The preferred reaction pathway connects the partially negative atoms to the partially positive ones.

Predicting the regiochemistry of the reaction via orbital control requires one to calculate the relative orbital coefficients on each atom of the reactants. The HOMO of the dienophile reacts with the LUMO of the diene. The relative orbital size on each atom is represented by orbital coefficients in the Frontier molecular orbital theory (FMO). Orbitals will align to maximize the bonding interactions, and minimize the anti-bonding interactions.

The orbitals with the largest coefficients in the reactive FMO's will overlap most strongly, and bond. Qualitatively, the largest FMO coefficients of the diene and dienophile are on gamma-carbon of acrolein and the terminal CH_{2} of the methyl vinyl ether, respectively.

=== Alder–Stein principle ===
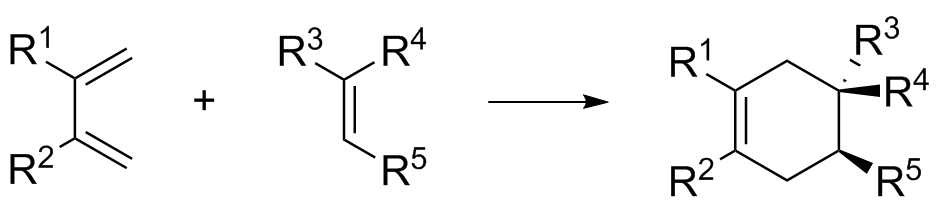
Because there is a single transition state, and all modes of attack are suprafacial, stereochemistry in this reaction is retained. R^{4} and R^{5} are cis in the dienophile, and syn in the product. Conversely, R^{3} and R^{5} are trans in the dienophile, and anti in the product. In addition, R^{1} and R^{2}share the same starting chemistry both in the diene, and the product.

The Alder–Stein principle states that the stereochemistry of the reactants is maintained in the stereochemistry of the products during a Diels–Alder reaction. This means that groups which were cis in relation to one another in the starting materials will be syn to one another in the product, and groups that were trans to one another in the starting material will be anti in the product.

The Alder–Stein principle has no bearing on the relative orientation of groups on the two starting materials. One cannot predict, via this principle, whether a substituent on the diene will be syn or anti to a substituent on the dienophile. The Alder–Stein principle is only consistent across the self-same starting materials. The relationship is only valid for the groups on the diene alone, or the groups on the dienophile, alone. The relative orientation of groups between the two reactants can be predicted by the endo selection rule.

=== Endo selection rule ===
In the endo transition state, the methoxy group is "inside" the boat; where in the exo transition state, it is "outside".

Similarly to the standard Diels–Alder reaction, the DA_{INV} also obeys a general endo selection rule. In the standard Diels–Alder, it is known that electron withdrawing groups on the dienophile will approach endo, with respect to the diene. The exact cause of this selectivity is still debated, but the most accepted view is that endo approach maximizes secondary orbital overlap. The DA_{INV} favors an endo orientation of electron donating substituents on the dienophile. Since all Diels–Alder reactions proceed through a boat transition state, there is an "inside" and an "outside" of the transition state (inside and outside the "boat"). The substituents on the dienophile are considered "endo" if they are 'inside' the boat, and "exo" if they are on the outside.

The exo pathway would be favored by sterics, so a different explanation is needed to justify the general predominance of endo products. Frontier molecular orbital theory can be used to explain this outcome. When the substituents of the dienophile are exo, there is no interaction between those substituents and the diene. However, when the dienophile substituents are endo, there is considerable orbital overlap with the diene. In the case of DA_{INV} the overlap of the orbitals of the electron withdrawing substituents with the orbitals of the diene create a favorable bonding interaction, stabilizing the transition state relative to the exo transition state. The reaction with the lower activation energy will proceed at a greater rate.

== Common dienes ==
The dienes used in Inverse electron demand Diels-Alder are relatively electron-deficient species; compared to the standard Diels-Alder, where the diene is electron rich. These electron-poor species have lower molecular orbital energies than their standard DA counterparts. This lowered energy results from the inclusion of either: A) electron withdrawing group, or B) electronegative heteroatoms. Aromatic compounds can also react in DA_{INV} reactions, such as triazines and tetrazines. Other common classes of dienes are oxo- and aza- butadienes.

The key quality of a good DA_{INV} diene is a significantly lowered HOMO and LUMO, as compared to standard DA dienes. Below is a table showing a few commonly used DA_{INV} dienes, their HOMO and LUMO energies, and some standard DA dienes, along with their respective MO energies.

Diene	Name	HOMO Energy (eV)	LUMO Energy (eV)	Reaction Pathway (DA/DA_{INV})
	2-cyclohexylidene-3-oxo-3-phenylpropanenitrile	-9.558	2.38	DA_{INV}
	Acrolein	-14.5	2.5	DA_{INV}
	5-cyclopentylidene-1,3-dimethylpyrimidine-2,4,6(1H,3H,5H)-trione	-10.346	1.879	DA_{INV}
	Butadiene	-10.346	1.879	DA or DA_{INV}
	1-Methoxy-butadiene	-8.21	3.77	DA
	2,3-dimethyl-butadiene	-8.76	2.18	DA

== Common dienophiles ==
The dienophiles used in inverse electron demand Diels-Alder reactions are, unlike in the standard DA, very electron rich, containing one or more electron donating groups. This results in higher orbital energies, and thus more orbital overlap with the LUMO of the diene. Common classes of dieneophiles for DA_{INV} reaction include vinyl ethers and vinyl acetals, imine, enamines, alkynes and highly strained olefins.

The most important consideration in choice of dienophile is its relative orbital energies. Both HOMO and LUMO impact the rate and selectivity of the reaction. A table of common DA_{INV} dienophiles, standard DA dienophiles, and their respective MO energies can be seen below.

Dienophile	Name	HOMO Energy (eV)	LUMO Energy (eV)	Reaction Pathway (DA/DA_{INV})
	ethyl vinyl ether	-9.006	5.313	DA_{INV}
	2-methylenetetrahydro-2H-pyran	-8.939	5.140	DA_{INV}
	1,1'-bis(cyclopentilidene)	-8.242	4.749	DA_{INV}
	Acrolein	-14.5	2.5	DA
	Cyclohexene	-8.94	2.1	DA
	Propene	-9.13	1.8	DA
	Ethylene	-10.52	1.5	DA

A second table shows how electron richness in the dienophiles affects the rate of reaction with a very electron poor diene, namely hexachlorocyclopentadiene. The more electron rich the dienophile is, the higher the rate of the reaction will be. This is very clear when comparing the relative rates of reaction for styrene and the less electron rich p-nitrostyrene; the more electron rich styrene reactions roughly 40% faster than p-nitrostyrene.

Dienophile	Relative reaction rate with hexachlorocyclopentadiene
Cyclopentadiene	15200
p-Methoxystyrene	1580
Styrene	750
p-Nitrostyrene	538
2,3-Dihydrofuran	333
Norbornene	70.8
Cyclopentene	59.0
Maleic anhydride	29.1
Cyclohexene	3.0

== Scope and applications ==
DA_{INV} reactions provide a pathway to a rich library of synthetic targets, and have been utilized to form many highly functionalized systems, including selectively protected sugars, an important contribution to the field of sugar chemistry. In addition, DA_{INV} reactions can produce an array of different products from a single starting material, such as tetrazine.

DA_{INV} reactions have been utilized for the synthesis of several natural products, including (-)-CC-1065, a parent compound in the Duocarmycin series, which found use as an anticancer treatment. Several drug candidates in this series have progress into clinical trials. The DA_{INV} reaction was used to synthesise the PDE-I and PDE-II sections of (-)-CC-1065. The first reaction in the sequence is a DA_{INV} reaction between the tetrazine and vinyl acetal, followed by a retro-Diels–Alder reaction to afford a 1,2-diazine product. After several more steps, an intramolecular DA_{INV} reaction occurs, followed again by a retro Diels-Alder in situ, to afford an indoline product. This indoline is a converted into either PDE-I or PDE-II in a few synthetic steps.

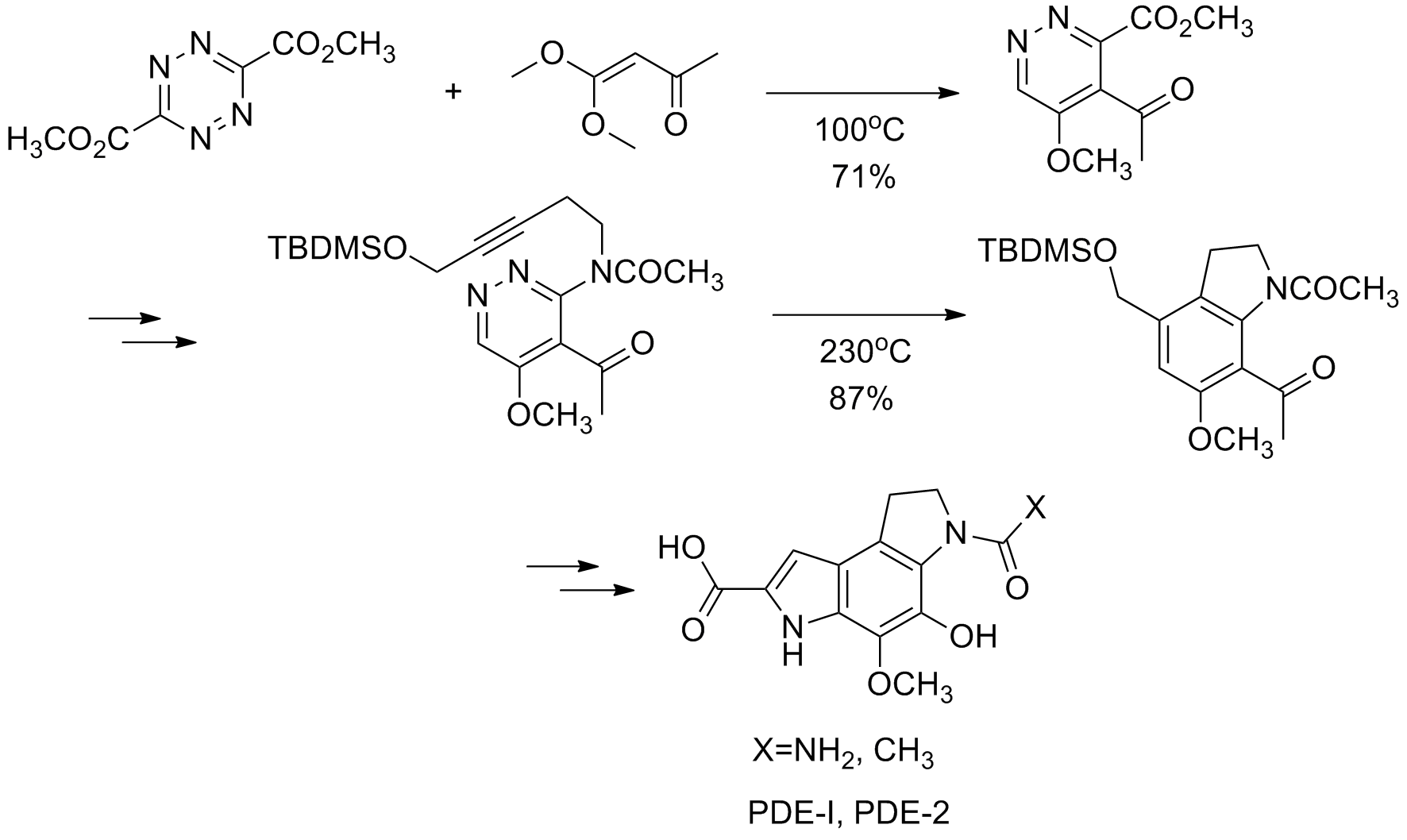
The synthesis of PDE-I and PDE-II contained two distinct uses of the DA_{INV} reaction. The first DA_{INV} reaction noccurs between a substituted tetrazine and a vinyl acetal. After several more steps, ad second DA_{INV} reaction is used to close one of the ring systems. The two PDE pieces were then coupled to form (-)-CC-1065.

DA_{INV} reaction between 2,3,4,5-tetrachlorothiophene-1,1-dioxide (diene) and 4,7-dihydroisoindole derivative (dienophile) afforded a new precursor for tetranaphthoporphyrins (TNP) bearing perchlorinated aromatic rings. This precursor can be transformed into corresponding porphyrins by Lewis acid-catalyzed condensation with aromatic aldehydes and further oxidation by DDQ. Polychlorination of the TNP system has a profound favorable effect on its solubility. Heavy aggregation and poor solubility of the parent tetranaphthoporphyrins severely degrade the usefulness of this potentially very valuable porphyrin family. Thus, the observed effect of polychlorination is very welcome. Besides the effect on the solubility, polychlorination also turned out to improve substantially the stability of these compounds towards photooxidation, which has been known to be another serious drawback of tetranaphthoporphyrins.

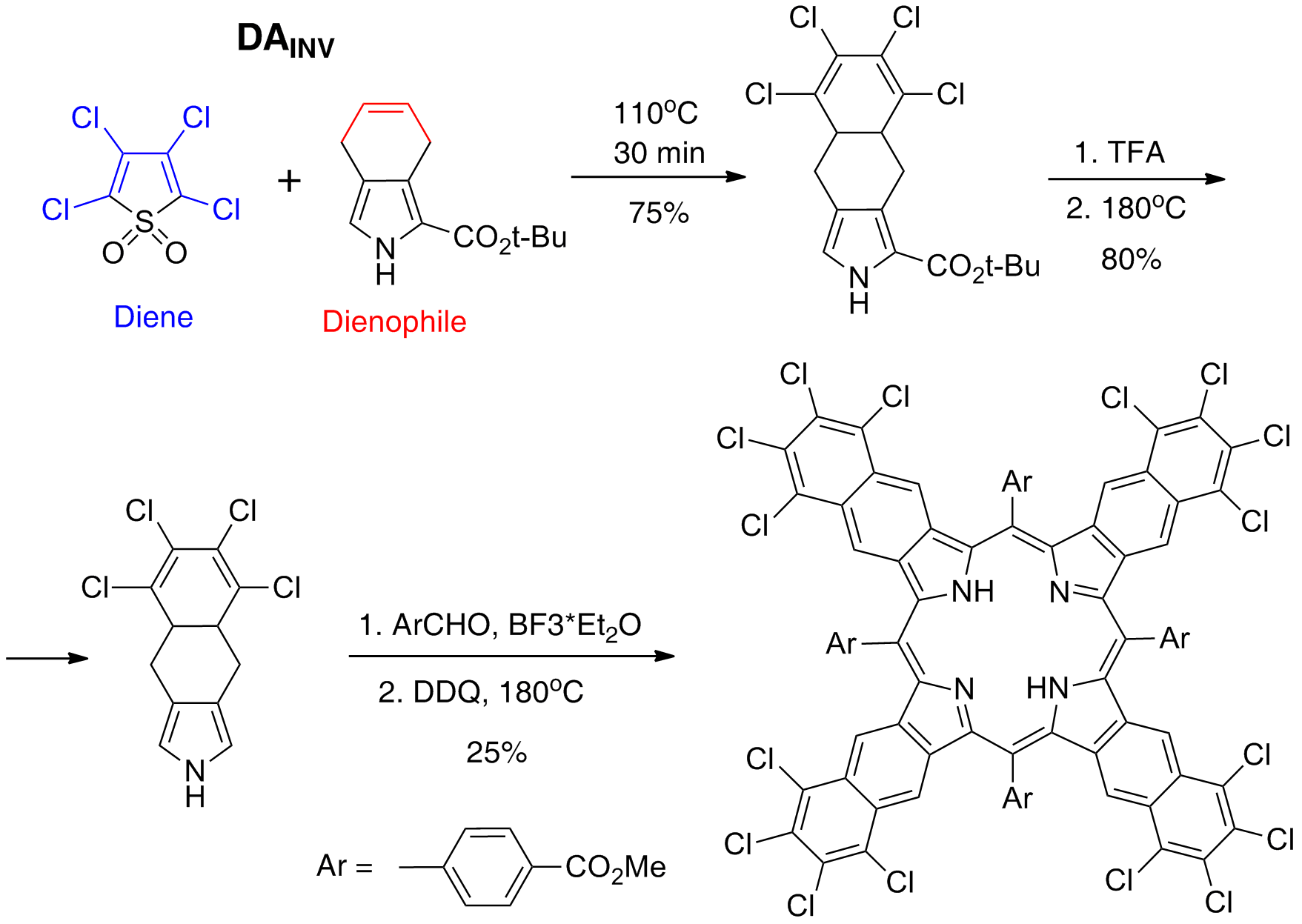
Use of inverse electron-demand reaction between 2,3,4,5-tetrachlorothiophene-1,1-dioxide and 4,7-dihydroisoindole derivation in the synthesis of polychlorinated tetranaphthoporphyrin.

== See also ==
- Diels–Alder reaction
- Cycloaddition
- Pericyclic reaction
- Molecular orbital theory
- Boger pyridine synthesis
