= C8H4N2 =

The molecular formula C_{8}H_{4}N_{2} (molar mass: 128.13 g/mol, exact mass: 128.0374 u) may refer to:

- Phthalonitrile, or phthalodinitrile
- Isophthalonitrile
- 1,4-Dicyanobenzene
