= Isoindole =

- Skeletal formula

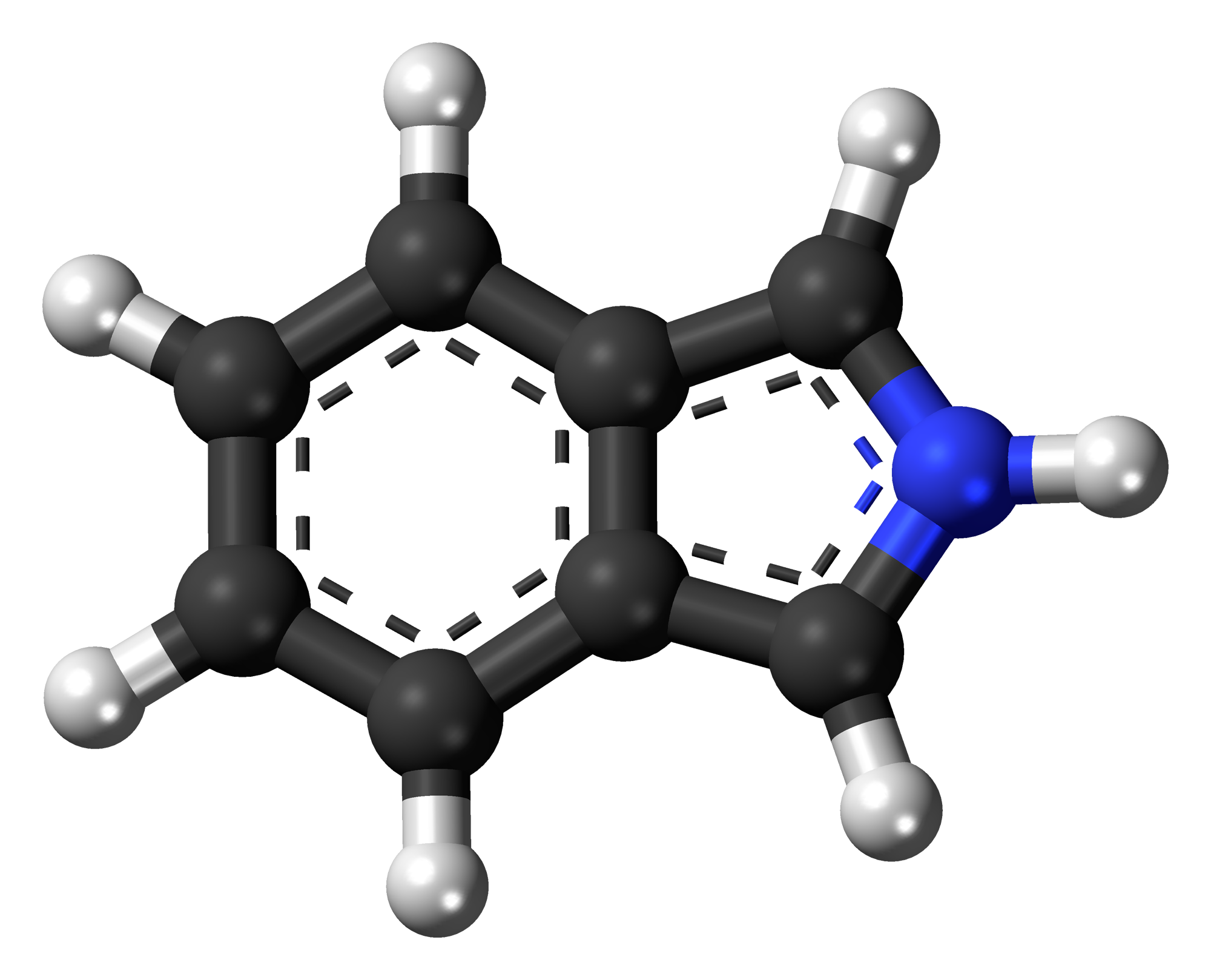
- Ball-and-stick model

Names
- Preferred IUPAC name 2H-Isoindole

Identifiers
CAS Number	270-68-8
3D model (JSmol)	Interactive image
ChEBI	CHEBI:33179
ChemSpider	2282425
PubChem CID	3013853
UNII	PR6T8TL5NT
CompTox Dashboard (EPA)	DTXSID40181488
- InChI: InChI=1S/C8H7N/c1-2-4-8-6-9-5-7(8)3-1/h1-6,9H Key: VHMICKWLTGFITH-UHFFFAOYSA-N; InChI=1/C8H7N/c1-2-4-8-6-9-5-7(8)3-1/h1-6,9H Key: VHMICKWLTGFITH-UHFFFAOYAW
- SMILES: c1cccc2c1c[nH]c2

Properties
Chemical formula	C_{8}H_{7}N
Molar mass	117.15 g/mol
- Except where otherwise noted, data are given for materials in their standard state (at 25 °C [77 °F], 100 kPa). verify (what is ?) Infobox references

Isoindole is a heterocyclic compound consisting of a benzene ring fused with pyrrole along the carbon-carbon bond furthest from its nitrogen atom. The compound is an isomer of indole. Isoindoline is a hydrogenated form of isoindole. The parent compound is rarely encountered in the literature, but its derivatives (notably phthalocyanine dyes) are of significant utility and commercial value. Several alkaloids containing this ring system have been isolated from plants.

== Synthesis ==
The parent isoindole was prepared by flash vacuum pyrolysis of N-(methoxycarbonyloxy)isoindoline.

N-Substituted isoindoles, which are more stable than the parent compound, can be prepared by dehydration of isoindoline-N-oxides. Other starting materials, including o-xylylene dibromide (o-C_{6}H_{4}(CH_{2}Br)_{2}), may be used in their synthesis.

== Structure and tautomerism of 2-H-isoindoles ==
Unlike indole, isoindoles exhibit noticeable alternation in the C-C bond lengths, which is consistent with their description as pyrrole derivatives fused to a butadiene.

In solutions, the 2H-isoindole tautomer predominates. It resembles a pyrrole more than a simple imine. The degree to which the 2H predominates depends on the solvent and on the arrangement of substituents (for isoindole derivatives).

2H-Isoindole (right) is the predominant tautomer relative to 1H-isoindole (left)

N-Substituted isoindoles do not tautomerize.

== Isoindole-1,3-diones and related derivatives ==
The commercially important phthalimide is an isoindole-1,3-dione with two carbonyl groups attached to the heterocyclic ring.

Illustrative Isoindoline Derivatives

Pigment yellow 139, a common high performance pigment.

Pigment yellow 185, a common high performance pigment.

Copper phthalocyanine, one of the most pervasive synthetic pigments.

== See also ==
- 1,3-Disubstituted Isoindolines.
- Isoindene with nitrogen replaced by a methylene group.
