= Pigment yellow 185 =

Names
- Preferred IUPAC name (2Z)-2-Cyano-N-methyl-2-[3-(2,4,6-trioxo-1,3-diazinan-5-ylidene)-2,3-dihydro-1H-isoindol-1-ylidene]acetamide
- Other names: Isoindolinone Yellow AS-AP; Isoindolinone Yellow AS-BH; Isoindolinone Yellow ASR-AG; Enceprint Yellow; Sico Fast Yellow D

Identifiers
CAS Number	76199-85-4
3D model (JSmol)	Interactive image
ChemSpider	21163126
ECHA InfoCard	100.071.241
EC Number	278-388-8
PubChem CID	5489883
UNII	7CF7E3AUE4
CompTox Dashboard (EPA)	DTXSID7072836
- InChI: InChI=1S/C16H11N5O4/c1-18-13(22)9(6-17)11-7-4-2-3-5-8(7)12(19-11)10-14(23)20-16(25)21-15(10)24/h2-5,19H,1H3,(H,18,22)(H2,20,21,23,24,25)/b11-9- Key: ACUPDOXCXXCPIX-LUAWRHEFSA-N
- SMILES: CNC(=O)/C(C#N)=C1/c2ccccc2C(N1)=C3C(=O)NC(=O)NC3=O

Properties
Chemical formula	C_{16}H_{11}N_{5}O_{4}
Molar mass	337.295 g·mol^{−1}
Appearance	yellow green solid
Density	1.576 g/cm^{3}
- Except where otherwise noted, data are given for materials in their standard state (at 25 °C [77 °F], 100 kPa). Infobox references

Pigment yellow 185 is an organic compound that is used as a green yellow pigment and optical brightener. It is classified as a derivative of isoindoline. This yellow green compound is prepared by addition of ammonia to phthalonitrile to give diiminoisoindole, which in turn condenses first with N-methylcyanoacetamide and then with barbituric acid.
