= Indole-2-monooxygenase =

Class of enzymes

Identifiers
- EC no.: 1.14.14.153

Databases
- IntEnz: IntEnz view
- BRENDA: BRENDA entry
- ExPASy: NiceZyme view
- KEGG: KEGG entry
- MetaCyc: metabolic pathway
- PRIAM: profile
- PDB structures: RCSB PDB PDBe PDBsum
Search
- PMC: articles
- PubMed: articles
- NCBI: proteins

Indole-2-monooxygenase (EC 1.14.14.153, BX2 (gene), CYP71C4 (gene)) is an enzyme with systematic name indole,NAD(P)H:oxygen oxidoreductase (2-hydroxylating). It catalyses the following chemical reaction:

indole
O_{2}
H_{2}O
oxindole

Indole-2-monooxygenase is a cytochrome P450 protein containing heme, isolated from Poaceae (grasses). It uses molecular oxygen for the oxidation and requires a partner cytochrome P450 reductase for functional expression. This uses nicotinamide adenine dinucleotide phosphate. It is involved in the biosynthesis of protective and allelopathic benzoxazinoids in some plants.
