= Lead(II) phthalocyanine =

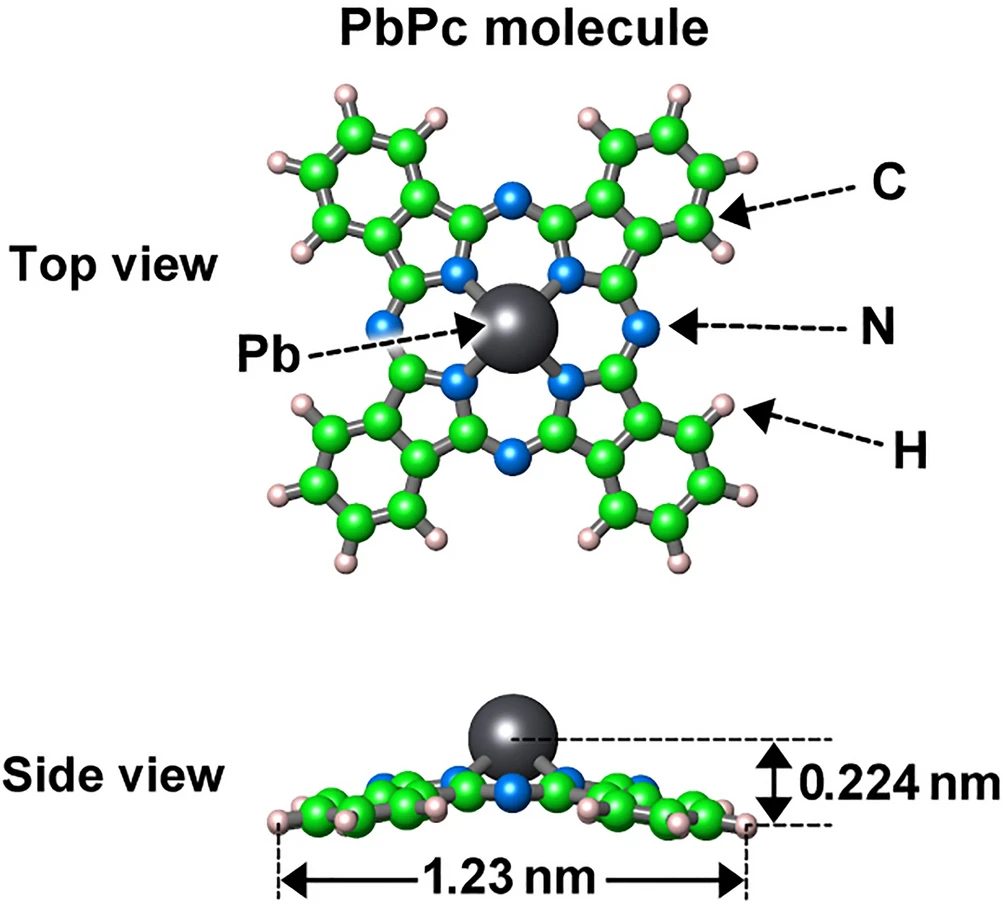

Identifiers
CAS Number	15187-16-3
3D model (JSmol)	Interactive image
ChemSpider	21170923
ECHA InfoCard	100.156.674
PubChem CID	636278
- InChI: InChI=1S/C32H16N8.Pb/c1-2-10-18-17(9-1)25-33-26(18)38-28-21-13-5-6-14-22(21)30(35-28)40-32-24-16-8-7-15-23(24)31(36-32)39-29-20-12-4-3-11-19(20)27(34-29)37-25;/h1-16H;/q-2;+2 Key: WSQYJDCCFQPFJC-UHFFFAOYSA-N
- SMILES: C1=CC=C2C(=C1)C3=NC4=C5C=CC=CC5=C6N4[Pb]N7C(=NC2=N3)C8=CC=CC=C8C7=NC9=NC(=N6)C1=CC=CC=C19

Properties
Chemical formula	C_{32}H_{16}N_{8}Pb
Molar mass	719.7 g·mol^{−1}

Related compounds
Other cations	Copper phthalocyanine; Manganese(II) phthalocyanine
- Except where otherwise noted, data are given for materials in their standard state (at 25 °C [77 °F], 100 kPa). Infobox references

Lead(II) Phthalocyanine (PbPc), also known as phthalocyanine lead, is a salt consisting of a lead ion and Pc2−, the conjugate base of pythalocyanine. It is a organolead dye and bright purple powder. It's also used as a near infared light absorber for photodetectors. It has a unique structural feature which is called and resembles a "shuttle cock."
