= Dihydroisoindole =

Dihydroisoindole may refer to:

- Isoindoline (2,3-Dihydroisoindole)
- 4,7-Dihydroisoindole
