= Manganese(II) phthalocyanine =

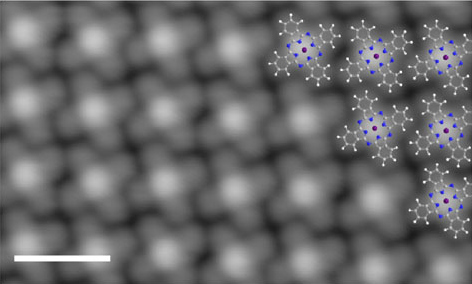
- STM image of a manganese(II) phthalocyanine monolayer on Pb, scale bar is 2 nm.

Identifiers
CAS Number	14325-24-7
3D model (JSmol)	ionic form: Interactive image; coordination form: Interactive image
ChemSpider	2016788
PubChem CID	2735074
CompTox Dashboard (EPA)	DTXSID401015331
- InChI: InChI=1S/C32H16N8.Mn/c1-2-10-18-17(9-1)25-33-26(18)38-28-21-13-5-6-14-22(21)30(35-28)40-32-24-16-8-7-15-23(24)31(36-32)39-29-20-12-4-3-11-19(20)27(34-29)37-25;/h1-16H;/q-2;+2 Key: ICIFYHOILPYQKB-UHFFFAOYSA-N; InChI=1/C32H16N8.Mn/c1-2-10-18-17(9-1)25-33-26(18)38-28-21-13-5-6-14-22(21)30(35-28)40-32-24-16-8-7-15-23(24)31(36-32)39-29-20-12-4-3-11-19(20)27(34-29)37-25;/h1-16H;/q-2;+2 Key: ICIFYHOILPYQKB-UHFFFAOYAW
- SMILES: ionic form: C1=CC=C2C(=C1)C3=NC4=NC(=NC5=C6C=CC=CC6=C([N-]5)N=C7C8=CC=CC=C8C(=N7)N=C2[N-]3)C9=CC=CC=C94.[Mn+2]; coordination form: C1=CC=C2C(=C1)C1=NC4=[N+]3C(=NC5=C6C=CC=CC6=C(N5[Mn]378)N=C5C6=CC=CC=C6C(=[N+]57)N=C2[N]18)C1=CC=CC=C14

Properties
Chemical formula	C_{32}H_{16}MnN_{8}
Molar mass	567.461 g/mol

Related compounds
Other cations	Copper phthalocyanine; Lead(II) phthalocyanine
- Except where otherwise noted, data are given for materials in their standard state (at 25 °C [77 °F], 100 kPa). verify (what is ?) Infobox references

Manganese(II) phthalocyanine is a coordination complex of manganese and phthalocyanine.
