= Phthalocyanine Green G =

Phthalo green
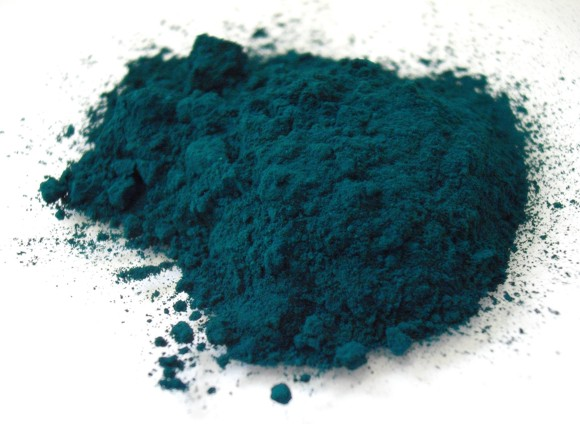
- Phthalocyanine green pigment

Colour coordinates
- Hex triplet: #123524
- sRGB^{B} (r, g, b): (18, 53, 36)
- HSV (h, s, v): (151°, 66%, 21%)
- CIELCh_{uv} (L, C, h): (19, 15, 146°)
- Source: The Mother of All HTML Colo(u)r Charts
- ISCC–NBS descriptor: Very dark yellowish green
- B: Normalized to [0–255] (byte)

One component of phthalocyanine Green G
- Chemical structure of one of the components of Phthalocyanine Green G

Names
- Other names Phthalo green, viridian hue, pigment green 7, copper phthalocyanine green, C.I. pigment green 7, non-flocculating green G, polychloro copper phthalocyanine, and C.I. 74260, copper hexadecachlorophthalocyanine

Identifiers
| CAS Number | 1328-53-6 |
| 3D model (JSmol) | Interactive image |
| ChemSpider | 21781844 |
| ECHA InfoCard | 100.014.114 |
| EC Number | 238-897-8 |
| PubChem CID | 26932 |
| UNII | BPO9294G4W |
| CompTox Dashboard (EPA) | DTXSID50933374 DTXSID8025911, DTXSID50933374 |
- InChI: InChI=1S/C32Cl16N8.Cu/c33-9-1-2(10(34)18(42)17(9)41)26-49-25(1)53-27-3-4(12(36)20(44)19(43)11(3)35)29(50-27)55-31-7-8(16(40)24(48)23(47)15(7)39)32(52-31)56-30-6-5(28(51-30)54-26)13(37)21(45)22(46)14(6)38;/q-2;+2 Key: ABFKYPFPQRDCGM-UHFFFAOYSA-N
- SMILES: C12=C(C(=C(C(=C1Cl)Cl)Cl)Cl)C3=NC4=NC(=NC5=C6C(=C([N-]5)N=C7C8=C(C(=C(C(=C8Cl)Cl)Cl)Cl)C(=N7)N=C2[N-]3)C(=C(C(=C6Cl)Cl)Cl)Cl)C9=C4C(=C(C(=C9Cl)Cl)Cl)Cl.[Cu+2]

Properties
| Chemical formula | C_{32}Cl_{16}CuN_{8} |
| Molar mass | 1127.15 g·mol^{−1} |
| Appearance | Green solid |
- Except where otherwise noted, data are given for materials in their standard state (at 25 °C [77 °F], 100 kPa). Infobox references

Phthalocyanine green G, which has many commercial names, is a synthetic green pigment from the group of phthalocyanine dyes, a complex of copper(II) with chlorinated phthalocyanine. It is a soft green powder, which is insoluble in water. It is a bright, high intensity colour used in oil and acrylic based artist's paints, and in other applications.

== Synthesis, properties, and structure ==
Phthalocyanine green is derived from phthalocyanine blue by chlorination in the presence of aluminium trichloride. The stoichiometry for the complete chlorination is shown:

Cu(C_{32}H_{16}N_{8}) + 16 Cl_{2} → Cu(C_{32}N_{8}Cl_{16}) + 16 HCl

In practice, this pigment is a mixture of isomers and degrees of chlorination. The 15th and 16th chlorides are difficult to install. The chemical formula usually ranges from C_{32}H_{3}Cl_{13}CuN_{8} to C_{32}HCl_{15}CuN_{8}.

Due to the presence of strongly electronegative chlorine substituents, the absorption spectrum is shifted from that of the parent copper phthalocyanine. Phthalo green is highly stable and resistant to alkali, acids, solvents, heat, and ultraviolet radiation.

The structure of the compound has been confirmed by X-ray crystallography. These experiments, which confirmed the expected square planar molecular geometry, were challenging because insolublity of the complex inhibited the growth of crystals.

== Uses ==
Due to its stability, phthalo green is used in inks, oil paint, coatings, and many plastics. In application it is transparent. Being insoluble, it has no tendency to migrate in the material. It is a standard pigment used in printing ink and packaging industry. It is also legal in all cosmetics except those used around the eyes. It is used in some tattoos.

== Related compounds ==
Copper phthalocyanine green 36 is a variant where some of the chlorine atoms are replaced with bromine. Bromination is less efficient than chlorination. Consequently, the degree of bromination is lower.

== See also ==
- The Joy of Painting - oil paint based on the pigment was frequently used on the show.
- Copper phthalocyanine (blue)
- Lists of colors
