= 2,3-Dihydro-DMT =

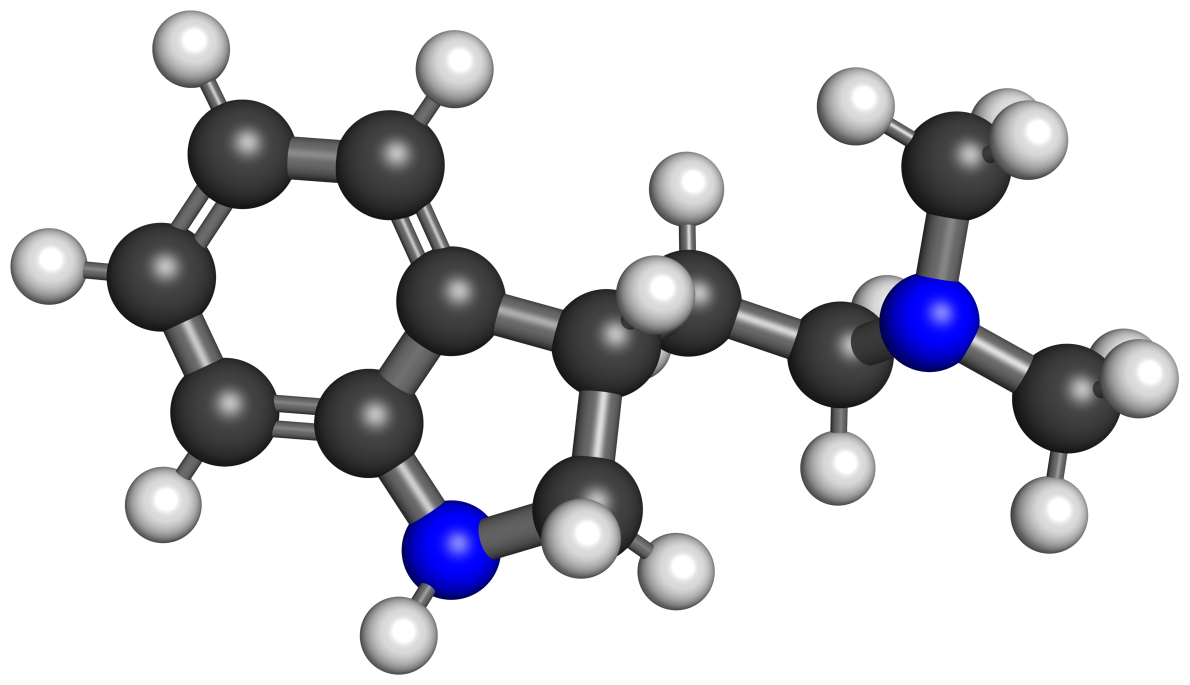

Names
- IUPAC name 2-(2,3-dihydro-1H-indol-3-yl)-N,N-dimethylethanamine
- Other names 2-(2,3-dihydro-1H-indol-3-yl)-N,N-dimethylethanamine

Identifiers
| 3D model (JSmol) | Interactive image |
| ChEMBL | ChEMBL159503 |
| ChemSpider | 9249366 |
| PubChem CID | 11074217 |
- InChI: InChI=1S/C11H14O/c1-7-8(2)11(12)10-6-4-3-5-9(7)10/h3-8,11-12H,1-2H3 Key: QJONJVMVPXLFKY-UHFFFAOYSA-N
- SMILES: CN(C)CCC1CNC2=CC=CC=C12

Properties
| Chemical formula | C_{12}H_{18}N_{2} |
| Molar mass | 190.290 g·mol^{−1} |
- Except where otherwise noted, data are given for materials in their standard state (at 25 °C [77 °F], 100 kPa). Infobox references

2,3-Dihydro-DMT, also known as 2,3-dihydro-N,N-dimethyltryptamine, is a chemical compound with moderate affinity for the serotonin 5-hydroxytryptamine 2B receptor. Structurally it belongs to the indolines.

== See also ==
- Substituted tryptamine § Related compounds
