= Pigment yellow 139 =

Names
- Preferred IUPAC name 5,5′-(1H-Isoindole-1,3(2H)-diylidene)di(1,3-diazinane-2,4,6-trione)
- Other names Lithol, Fast Yellow 1840

Identifiers
CAS Number	36888-99-0
3D model (JSmol)	Interactive image
ChemSpider	4590022
ECHA InfoCard	100.048.399
EC Number	253-256-2
PubChem CID	5488898
UNII	ZW25289FVV
CompTox Dashboard (EPA)	DTXSID7068007
- InChI: InChI=1S/C16H9N5O6/c22-11-7(12(23)19-15(26)18-11)9-5-3-1-2-4-6(5)10(17-9)8-13(24)20-16(27)21-14(8)25/h1-4,17H,(H2,18,19,22,23,26)(H2,20,21,24,25,27) Key: JSBMGPVJAADXIZ-UHFFFAOYSA-N
- SMILES: O=C1NC(=O)NC(=O)C1=C2c3ccccc3C(N2)=C4C(=O)NC(=O)NC4=O

Properties
Chemical formula	C_{16}H_{9}N_{5}O_{6}
Appearance	orange solid
Density	1.742 g/cm^{3}
- Except where otherwise noted, data are given for materials in their standard state (at 25 °C [77 °F], 100 kPa). Infobox references

Pigment yellow 139 is an organic compound that is used as a yellow-orange pigment. It is classified as a derivative of isoindoline. This yellow-orange solid is virtually insoluble in most solvents.

It is prepared by addition of ammonia to phthalonitrile to give diiminoisoindole, which in turn condenses with barbituric acid.
