= C8H7NS =

The molecular formula C_{8}H_{7}NS (molar mass: 149.21 g/mol, exact mass: 149.0299 u) may refer to:

- Benzyl isothiocyanate (BITC)
- Benzothiazine
- 2-Mercaptoindole
