= C8H7N =

The molecular formula C_{8}H_{7}N (molar mass: 117.15 g/mol, exact mass: 117.0578 u) may refer to:

- Benzyl cyanide (BnCN)
- Indole
- Indolizine
- Isoindole
