= Isophthalonitrile =

Names
- Preferred IUPAC name Benzene-1,3-dicarbonitrile
- Other names 1,3-Dicyanobenzene

Identifiers
CAS Number	626-17-5
3D model (JSmol)	Interactive image
ChEBI	CHEBI:38218
ChEMBL	ChEMBL3182143
ChemSpider	11773
ECHA InfoCard	100.009.940
EC Number	210-933-7
PubChem CID	12276
RTECS number	CZ1900000
UNII	7G36N0292W
UN number	2811 3276
CompTox Dashboard (EPA)	DTXSID7027259
- InChI: InChI=1S/C8H4N2/c9-5-7-2-1-3-8(4-7)6-10/h1-4H Key: LAQPNDIUHRHNCV-UHFFFAOYSA-N
- SMILES: C1=CC(=CC(=C1)C#N)C#N

Properties
Chemical formula	C_{8}H_{4}N_{2}
Molar mass	128.134 g·mol^{−1}
Melting point	162–163 °C (324–325 °F; 435–436 K)
Boiling point	288 °C (550 °F; 561 K)

Hazards
- GHS labelling
Pictograms	(GHS07: Exclamation mark)
Signal word	Warning
Hazard statements	H302, H332
Precautionary statements	P261, P264, P270, P271, P301+P312, P304+P312, P304+P340, P312, P330, P501
- Except where otherwise noted, data are given for materials in their standard state (at 25 °C [77 °F], 100 kPa). Infobox references

Isophthalonitrile is an organic compound with the formula C_{6}H_{4}(CN)_{2}. Two other isomers exist, phthalonitrile and terephthalonitrile. All three isomers are produced commercially by ammoxidation of the corresponding xylene isomers. Isophthalonitrile is a colorless or white solid with low solubility in water. Hydrogenation of isophthalonitrile affords m-xylylenediamine, a curing agent in epoxy resins and a component of some urethanes.

== Safety ==
The LD_{50} of isophthalonitrile is 288 mg/kg (rat, oral).
