= 1,4-Dicyanobenzene =

Names
- Preferred IUPAC name Benzene-1,4-dicarbonitrile
- Other names Terephthalonitrile; p-Dicyanobenzene

Identifiers
CAS Number	623-26-7
3D model (JSmol)	Interactive image
ChEBI	CHEBI:747247
ChEMBL	ChEMBL3248224
ChemSpider	11672
ECHA InfoCard	100.009.804
EC Number	210-783-2
PubChem CID	12172
UNII	E6ITH5CIS3
CompTox Dashboard (EPA)	DTXSID1060768
- InChI: InChI=1S/C8H4N2/c9-5-7-1-2-8(6-10)4-3-7/h1-4H Key: BHXFKXOIODIUJO-UHFFFAOYSA-N
- SMILES: C1=CC(=CC=C1C#N)C#N

Properties
Chemical formula	C_{8}H_{4}N_{2}
Molar mass	128.134 g·mol^{−1}
Appearance	white solid
Melting point	224–227 °C (435–441 °F; 497–500 K)

Hazards
- GHS labelling
Pictograms	(GHS07: Exclamation mark)
Signal word	Warning
Hazard statements	H315, H319, H335
Precautionary statements	P261, P264, P271, P280, P302+P352, P304+P340, P305+P351+P338, P312, P321, P332+P313, P337+P313, P362, P403+P233, P405, P501
- Except where otherwise noted, data are given for materials in their standard state (at 25 °C [77 °F], 100 kPa). Infobox references

1,4-Dicyanobenzene is an organic compound with the formula C_{6}H_{4}(CN)_{2}. Two other isomers exist, phthalonitrile and isophthalonitrile. All three isomers are produced commercially by ammoxidation of the corresponding xylene isomers. 1,4-Dicyanobenzene is a colorless or white solid with low solubility in water. Hydrogenation of isophthalonitrile affords p-xylylenediamine.

1,4-dicyanobenzene is electrochemically active, undergoing reduction to form a persistent radical anion. For this reason, it has been used as a catalyst for automated reaction discovery, testing whether other species are redox active. It also has applications in photoredox catalysis as an organic photooxidant, as its singlet excited state has a high reduction potential, +2.55 relative to the saturated calomel electrode.

== Safety ==
The LD_{50} (rat, oral) is 6400 mg/kg.
