= Boger pyridine synthesis =

Synthesis in organic chemistry

The Boger pyridine synthesis is a cycloaddition approach to the formation of pyridines named after its inventor Dale L. Boger, who first reported it in 1981. The reaction is a form of inverse-electron demand Diels-Alder reaction in which an enamine reacts with a 1,2,4-triazine to form the pyridine nucleus. The reaction is especially useful for accessing pyridines that would be difficult or impossible to access via other methods and has been used in the total synthesis of several complicated natural products.

== Mechanism ==
The enamine is generally generated in situ from catalytic amine (such as pyrrolidine) and a ketone. The enamine then reacts as the dienophile with a 1,2,4-triazine. The initial adduct then expels nitrogen, and the pyridine is rearomatized with loss of the amine.

Mechanism Boger Pyridine Synthesis
