= Copper phthalocyanine =

Synthetic blue pigment from the group of phthalocyanine dyes

Names
- IUPAC name (29H,31H-phthalocyaninato(2−)-N29,N30,N31,N32)copper(II)
- Other names Copper(II) phthalocyanine Monastral blue Phthalocyanine blue Phthalo blue Thalo blue Pigment Blue 15

Identifiers
CAS Number	147-14-8
3D model (JSmol)	Interactive image
ChEBI	CHEBI:155903
ChemSpider	8631
ECHA InfoCard	100.005.169
PubChem CID	6531516
UNII	3VEX9T7UT5
CompTox Dashboard (EPA)	DTXSID8027117
- InChI: InChI=1S/C32H16N8.Cu/c1-2-10-18-17(9-1)25-33-26(18)38-28-21-13-5-6-14-22(21)30(35-28)40-32-24-16-8-7-15-23(24)31(36-32)39-29-20-12-4-3-11-19(20)27(34-29)37-25;/h1-16H;/q-2;+2 Key: XCJYREBRNVKWGJ-UHFFFAOYSA-N
- SMILES: C1=CC=C2C(=C1)C3=NC4=NC(=NC5=C6C=CC=CC6=C([N-]5)N=C7C8=CC=CC=C8C(=N7)N=C2[N-]3)C9=CC=CC=C94.[Cu+2]

Properties
Chemical formula	C_{32}H_{16}CuN_{8}
Molar mass	576.082 g·mol^{−1}
Appearance	dark blue solid

Related compounds
Other cations	Lead(II) phthalocyanine; Manganese(II) phthalocyanine
- Except where otherwise noted, data are given for materials in their standard state (at 25 °C [77 °F], 100 kPa). Infobox references

Phthalo blue
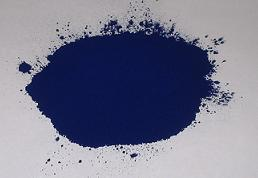
- Phthalocyanine blue pigment powder

Color coordinates
- Hex triplet: #000F89
- sRGB^{B} (r, g, b): (0, 15, 137)
- HSV (h, s, v): (233°, 100%, 54%)
- CIELCh_{uv} (L, C, h): (16, 61, 265°)
- Source: The Mother of All HTML Colo(u)r Charts
- ISCC–NBS descriptor: Vivid blue
- B: Normalized to [0–255] (byte); H: Normalized to [0–100] (hundred)

Copper phthalocyanine (CuPc), also called phthalocyanine blue, phthalo blue and many other names, is a bright, crystalline, synthetic blue pigment from the group of dyes based on phthalocyanines. Its brilliant blue is frequently used in paints and dyes. It is highly valued for its superior properties such as light fastness, tinting strength, covering power and resistance to the effects of alkalis and acids. It has the appearance of a blue powder, insoluble in most solvents including water.

== Synonyms and trade names ==
The substance, IUPAC name (29H,31H-phthalocyaninato(2−)-N29,N30,N31,N32)copper(II), is known by many names such as monastral blue, phthalo blue, helio blue, thalo blue, Winsor blue, phthalocyanine blue, C.I. Pigment Blue 15:2, copper phthalocyanine blue, copper tetrabenzoporphyrazine, Cu-phthaloblue, P.B.15.2, C.I. 74160, and British Rail Blue. Numerous other trade names and synonyms exist. The abbreviation "CuPc" is also used.

== Structure, reactivity and properties ==
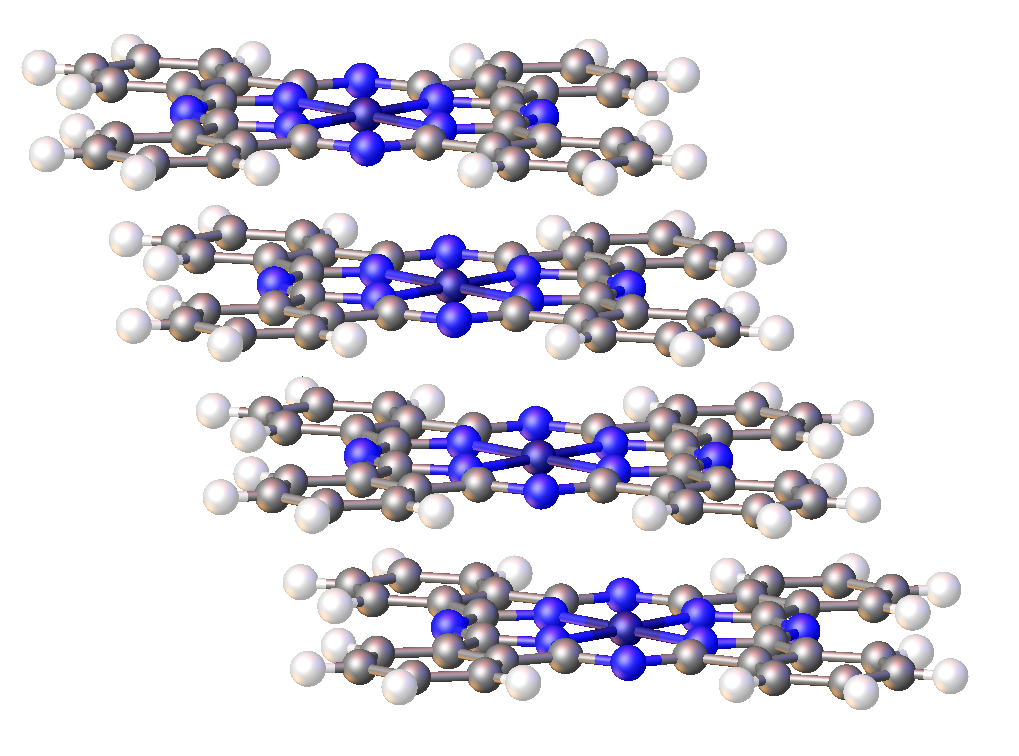
Portion of crystal structure of CuPc, highlighting its slipped-stack packing motif.

Copper phthalocyanine is a complex of copper(II) with the conjugate base of phthalocyanine, i.e. Cu^{2+}Pc^{2−}. The description is analogous to that for copper porphyrins, which are also formally derived by double deprotonation of porphyrins. CuPc belongs to the D_{4h} point group. It is paramagnetic with one unpaired electron per molecule.

The substance is practically insoluble in water (< 0.1 g/100 ml at 20 °C (68 °F)), but soluble in concentrated sulfuric acid. Density of the solid is ≈1.6 g/cm^{3}. The color is due to a π–π* electronic transition, with λ_{max} ≈ 610 nm.

=== Crystalline phases ===
CuPc crystallizes in various forms (polymorphs). Five different polymorphs have been identified: phases α, β, η, γ and χ. The two most common structures in CuPc are the β phase and the metastable α phase. Those phases can be distinguished by the overlap of their neighboring molecules. The α phase has a larger overlap and thus, a smaller Cu-Cu spacing (≈3.8 Å) compared to the β phase (≈4.8 Å).

== Manufacture ==
Two manufacturing processes have gained commercial importance for the production of copper phthalocyanine:

- The phthalonitrile process, mainly used in Germany
- The phthalic anhydride/urea process, developed in Great Britain and in the USA.

Both approaches can be carried out with (solvent process) or without (baking process) a solvent. Higher yields may be achieved with the solvent process (> 95%) than with the baking process (70 to 80%), so that the solvent process has initially stimulated more interest. However, recent trends show a reverse tendency for the baking process mainly on the grounds of economical and ecological concerns (solvent-free, shorter lead time).

=== Phthalonitrile process ===
This approach involves heating phthalonitrile with a copper salt, usually copper(I)chloride at 200 °C to 240 °C. The gross reaction equation from phthalonitrile may be written as follows:

4 C_{6}H_{4}(CN)_{2} + Cu^{2+} + 2e^{−} → CuPc

=== Phthalic anhydride/urea process ===
The gross reaction equation from phthalic anhydride and urea may be written as follows:

4 C_{6}H_{4}(CO)_{2}O + 4 (NH_{2})_{2}CO + Cu^{2+} + 2e^{−} → CuPc + 8 H_{2}O + 4 CO_{2} + 4 NH_{3}

== Applications ==
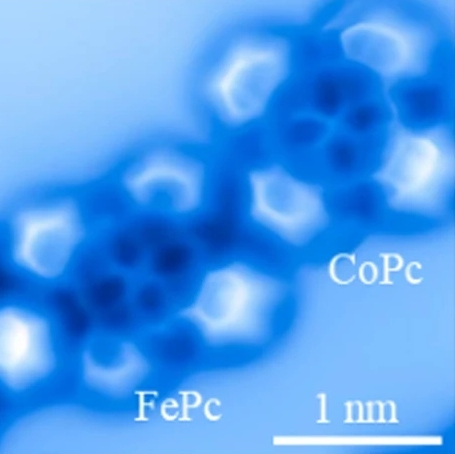
AFM image of Fe and Co phthalocyanines

=== Catalysis ===
Metal phthalocyanines have long been examined as catalysts for redox reactions. Areas of interest are the oxygen reduction reaction and the sweetening of gas streams by removal of hydrogen sulfide.

=== Colorant ===
Due to its stability, phthalo blue is also used in inks, coatings, and many plastics. The pigment is insoluble and has no tendency to migrate in the material. It is a standard pigment used in printing ink and the packaging industry. Industrial production was of the order of 10,000 tonnes per annum in the 1980s and 1990s in Japan alone. The pigment is the highest volume pigment produced.

All major artists' pigment manufacturers produce variants of copper phthalocyanine, designated color index PB15 (blue) and color indexes PG7 and PG36 (green).

A common component on the artist's palette, phthalo blue is a cool blue with a bias towards green. It has intense tinting strength and easily overpowers the mix when combined with other colors. It is a transparent staining color and can be applied using glazing techniques.

It is present in a wide variety of products, such as color deposition hair conditioner, gel ink pens, eye patches, perfume, shampoo, skin-care products, soap, sunscreen, tattoo ink, toothpaste, and even turf colorants.

== Research ==
CuPc has often been investigated in the context of molecular electronics. It is potentially suited for organic solar cells because of its high chemical stability and uniform growth. CuPc usually plays the role of the electron donor in donor/acceptor based solar cells. One of the most common donor/acceptor architectures is CuPc/C_{60} (buckminsterfullerene) which rapidly became a model system for the study of small organic molecules. Photon to electron conversion efficiency in such system reaches approximately 5%.

CuPc has also been investigated as a component of organic field-effect transistors. Copper Phthalocyanine (CuPc) has been suggested for data storage in quantum computing, due to the length of time its electrons can remain in superposition. CuPc can be easily processed into a thin film for use in device fabrication, which makes it an attractive qubit candidate.

== Derivatives and related compounds ==
Approximately 25% of all artificial organic pigments are phthalocyanine derivatives. Copper phthalocyanine dyes are produced by introducing solubilizing groups, such as one or more sulfonic acid functions. These dyes find use in various areas of textile dyeing (Direct dyes for cotton), for spin dyeing and in the paper industry. Direct blue 86 is the sodium salt of CuPc-sulfonic acid, whereas direct blue 199 is the quaternary ammonium salt of the CuPc-sulfonic acid. The quaternary ammonium salts of these sulfonic acids are used as solvent dyes because of their solubility in organic solvents, such as Solvent Blue 38 and Solvent Blue 48. The dye derived from cobalt phthalocyanine and an amine is Phthalogen Dye IBN. 1,3-Diiminoisoindolene, the intermediate formed during phthalocyanine manufacture, used in combination with a copper salt affords the dye GK 161.

Copper phthalocyanine is also used as a source material for manufacture of Phthalocyanine Green G. The CuPc is treated with chlorine in the presence of aluminium trichloride:

Cu(C_{32}H_{16}N_{8}) + 16 Cl_{2} → Cu(C_{32}N_{8}Cl_{16}) + 16 HCl

Other related and commercially available phthalocyanines blue pigments are:

- Pigment Blue 16 – metal-free phthalocyanine
- Pigment Blue 75 – cobalt phthalocyanine
- Pigment Blue 79 – aluminum phthalocyanine

== History ==
The discovery of metal phthalocyanines can be traced to the observation of intensely colored byproducts from reactions of phthalic acid (benzene-1,2-dicarboxylic acid) or its derivatives with sources of nitrogen and metals. CuPc (copper phthalocyanine) was first prepared in 1927 by the reaction of copper(I) cyanide and o-dibromobenzene, which mainly produces colorless phthalonitrile as well as an intensely blue by-product. A couple of years later, workers at Scottish Dyes observed the formation of traces of phthalocyanine dyes in the synthesis of phthalimide by the reaction of phthalic anhydride and ammonia in the presence of metallic iron. In 1937, DuPont started producing copper phthalocyanine blue in the USA under the trade name Monastral Blue after it had been previously launched in Great Britain (ICI) and Germany (I.G. Farbenindustrie) in 1935.

Difficulty was experienced in forming stable dispersions with the first alpha forms, especially in mixtures with rutile titanium, where the blue pigment tended to flocculate. The beta form was more stable, as was the improved stabilized alpha form. Today, there are even more isomeric forms available.

== Toxicity and hazards ==
The compound is not toxic to fish or plants, possibly because it is non-biodegradable. No specific dangers have been associated with this compound. Oral LD_{50} in mammals is estimated to be greater than 5 g per kg, with no ill effects found at that level of ingestion. For chronic ingestion estimated dose of low concern was 0.2 mg/kg per day in rats. There is no evidence of carcinogenic effects. Sulfonated phthalocyanine has been found to cause neuroanatomical defects in developing chicken embryos when injected directly into incubating eggs.

== See also ==
- Phthalocyanine Green G
- British Rail corporate liveries § Rail Blue – use of the pigment as the standard livery for British Rail trains from 1965 onwards.
- The Joy of Painting – oil paint based on the pigment was frequently used on the show.
- List of colors
