= Naphthalocyanine =

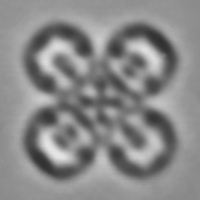
Schematic and AFM image

Names
- IUPAC name 21H,23H-Tetranaphtho[2′,3′:2,3;2′′,3′′:7,8;2′′′,3′′′:12,13;2′′′ ′,3′′′ ′:17,18]porphyrin
- Systematic IUPAC name [1^{1}(2)Z,1^{3}(8)Z,3^{3}(4)Z,7(8^{1})Z]-1^{2}H,5^{2}H-2,4,6,8-Tetraaza-1,3,5,7(1,3)-tetrakis(benzo[f]isoindola)cyclooctaphane-1^{1}(2),1^{3}(8),3^{3}(4),7(8^{1})-tetraene
- Other names Tetrabenzo[g]quinoxalino-2,3-porphyrazine

Identifiers
CAS Number	23627-89-6
3D model (JSmol)	Interactive image
ChemSpider	4677874
PubChem CID	5748311
CompTox Dashboard (EPA)	DTXSID50905112
- InChI: InChI=1S/C48H26N8/c1-2-10-26-18-34-33(17-25(26)9-1)41-49-42(34)54-44-37-21-29-13-5-6-14-30(29)22-38(37)46(51-44)56-48-40-24-32-16-8-7-15-31(32)23-39(40)47(52-48)55-45-36-20-28-12-4-3-11-27(28)19-35(36)43(50-45)53-41/h1-24H,(H2,49,50,51,52,53,54,55,56) Key: LKKPNUDVOYAOBB-UHFFFAOYSA-N
- SMILES: C1(/N=C(C2=C/3C=C4C=CC=CC4=C2)\NC3=N/C(C5=C/6C=C(C=CC=C7)C7=C5)=NC6=N/8)=N/C(C9=CC%10=CC=CC=C%10C=C19)=N\C%11=C%12C=C%13C=CC=CC%13=CC%12=C8N%11

Properties
Chemical formula	C_{48}H_{26}N_{8}
Molar mass	714.792 g·mol^{−1}
- Except where otherwise noted, data are given for materials in their standard state (at 25 °C [77 °F], 100 kPa). verify (what is ?) Infobox references

Naphthalocyanine is a cross-shaped organic molecule consisting of 48 carbon, 8 nitrogen and 26 hydrogen atoms. It is a derivative of phthalocyanine, differing by having 4 extra carbon rings, one on each "arm." IBM Research labs used it for developing single-molecule logic switches and visualizing charge distribution in a single molecule.

Naphthalocyanine derivatives have a potential use in photodynamic cancer treatment.
