= Flash vacuum pyrolysis =

In organic chemistry. flash vacuum pyrolysis (FVP) is a technique that entails heating a precursor molecule intensely and briefly, often in an argon atmosphere. The method is used to induce transformations that cannot readily be achieved in solution methods such as in refluxing solvents. The technique is uncommon due in part to limitations on the scale on which reactions can be carried out.

In terms of implementation of FVP, two key parameters are the temperature and duration (or residence time). Often the experiment entails volatilizing a precursor, which is drawn through a "hot zone" followed by rapid condensation. The apparatus typically is conducted under dynamic vacuum. The hot zone must impart heat to the gaseous molecules, so it is packed with solids to induce gas-solid collisions. The packing material is generally chemically inert, such as quartz. The precursor (i) volatilizes with gentle heating and under vacuum, (ii) the precursor fragments or rearranges in the hot zone, and finally (iii) the products are collected by rapid cooling. Rapid post-reaction cooling and the dilution inherent in gases both suppress bimolecular degradation pathways.

The technique is applied to conversions that proceed via unimolecular pathways.

== Examples ==
- 2-Acetoxydioxane, when heated at 425 °C converts to the highly reactive dioxene by loss of acetic acid.
- 2-Furonitrile has been prepared by flash-dehydration of 2-furoic acid amide or oxime over molecular sieves.
- The unusual benzocyclobutenone has been prepared by the FVP of 2-methylbenzoyl chloride.

Illustration of FVP process, the intermediate ketene is unstable and the product, like most organic compounds, tolerates brief, but not prolonged treatment at high temperatures.

- FVP was used to effect a retro-[4+2] cycloaddition (extruding cyclopentadiene) in the earlier stages of the total synthesis of Galbulimima belgraveana alkaloid GB-13.
- Isoindole can be produced by FVP of the methoxycarbonate of isoindoline, when sublimed through a tube heated at 500 °C (0.01 mm Hg). A white solid is deposited on to a liquid-nitrogen probe held at the exit of the hot tube. Upon warning to room temperature, this white solid quickly decomposed into a dark solid.

FVP route to isoindole
