= 2-Indolinethione =

Names
- Preferred IUPAC name 1,3-Dihydro-2H-indole-2-thione
- Other names 1,3-Dihydroindole-2-thione

Identifiers
CAS Number	496-30-0; tautomer: 53497-58-8
3D model (JSmol)	Interactive image
ChEMBL	ChEMBL1345979
ChemSpider	2297319; tautomer: 11341121
ECHA InfoCard	100.220.246
EC Number	692-228-8
PubChem CID	3032310
UNII	S9SC88MKF6
CompTox Dashboard (EPA)	DTXSID20197921
- InChI: InChI=1S/C8H7NS/c10-8-5-6-3-1-2-4-7(6)9-8/h1-4H,5H2,(H,9,10) Key: IGJWTYFTQNHSEK-UHFFFAOYSA-N
- SMILES: C1C2=CC=CC=C2NC1=S

Properties
Chemical formula	C_{8}H_{7}NS
Molar mass	149.21 g·mol^{−1}
Appearance	white solid
Density	1.27 g/cm^{3}
Melting point	44–45 °C (111–113 °F; 317–318 K)

Hazards
- GHS labelling
Pictograms	(GHS07: Exclamation mark)
Signal word	Warning
Hazard statements	H302, H315, H319, H335
Precautionary statements	P261, P264, P264+P265, P270, P271, P280, P301+P317, P302+P352, P304+P340, P305+P351+P338, P317, P319, P321, P330, P332+P317, P337+P317, P362+P364, P403+P233, P405, P501
- Except where otherwise noted, data are given for materials in their standard state (at 25 °C [77 °F], 100 kPa). Infobox references

2-Indolinethione is an organic compound with the formula C_{8}H_{6}(S)(NH). It is a derivative of dihydroindole containing a thione group. The compound is a tautomer of 2-mercaptoindole. A white solid, it is prepared by thiation of 2-oxindole. 2-Indolinethione is a precursor to several natural products.
