= Oxindole =

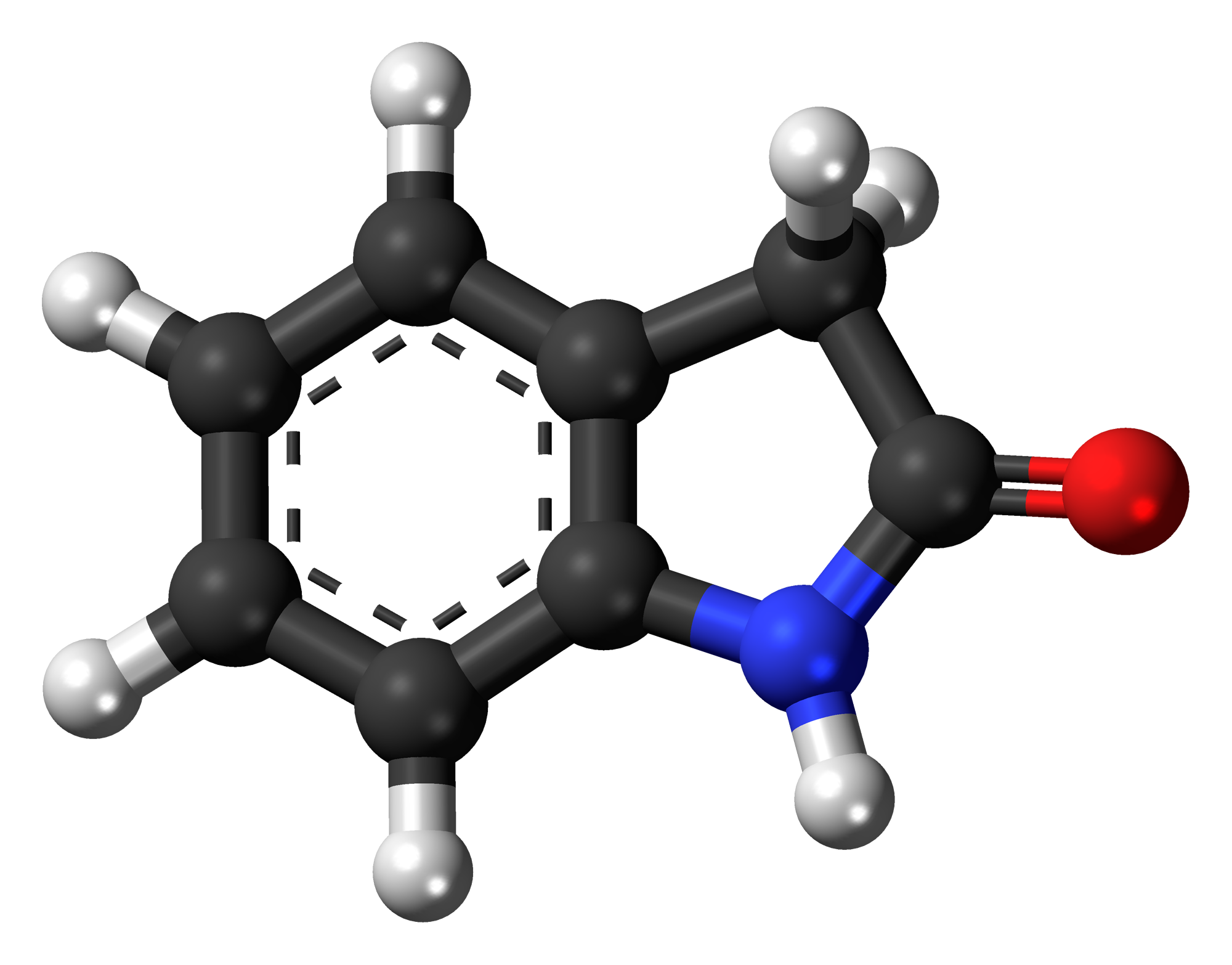

Names
- Preferred IUPAC name 1,3-Dihydro-2H-indol-2-one
- Other names 2-Hydroxyindole

Identifiers
CAS Number	59-48-3
3D model (JSmol)	Interactive image
Beilstein Reference	114692
ChEBI	CHEBI:31697
ChEMBL	ChEMBL40823
ChemSpider	284794
ECHA InfoCard	100.000.390
EC Number	200-429-5
Gmelin Reference	637057
KEGG	C12312
MeSH	Oxindole
PubChem CID	321710
RTECS number	NM2080500
UNII	0S9338U62H
CompTox Dashboard (EPA)	DTXSID80870389
- InChI: InChI=1S/C8H7NO/c10-8-5-6-3-1-2-4-7(6)9-8/h1-4H,5H2,(H,9,10) Key: JYGFTBXVXVMTGB-UHFFFAOYSA-N
- SMILES: c1ccc2c(c1)CC(=O)N2

Properties
Chemical formula	C_{8}H_{7}NO
Molar mass	133.150 g·mol^{−1}
Appearance	pale yellow solid
Melting point	128 °C (262 °F; 401 K)
- Except where otherwise noted, data are given for materials in their standard state (at 25 °C [77 °F], 100 kPa). Infobox references

Oxindole (2-indolone) is an aromatic heterocyclic organic compound with the formula C_{6}H_{4}CH_{2}C(O)NH. It has a bicyclic structure, consisting of a six-membered benzene ring fused to a five-membered nitrogen-containing ring. Oxindole is a modified indoline with a substituted carbonyl at the second position of the 5-member indoline ring. Classified as a cyclic amide, it is a pale yellow solid.

== Formation and reactions ==
Oxindole is derived in nature from tryptophan, formed by gut bacteria ("normal flora"). It is normally metabolized and detoxified from the body by the liver. In excess, it can cause sedation, muscle weakness, hypotension, and coma. Patients with hepatic encephalopathy have been recorded to have elevated serum oxindole levels.

Treatment with phosphorus pentasulfide gives the thione.

== Oxindoles ==
Beyond the parent compound, the oxindole structure is present in many compounds including, for example, rhynchophylline, 3-methyloxindole, and semaxanib.

Rhynchophylline, a naturally occurring oxindole is a medicinal used as an NMDA antagonist and a calcium channel blocker.
