= Diiminoisoindole =

Names
- IUPAC name 3-Iminoisoindol-1-amine
- Other names Isoindoline-1,3-diimine; Phthalimide diimide

Identifiers
CAS Number	3468-11-9
3D model (JSmol)	Interactive image
ChemSpider	17919
ECHA InfoCard	100.020.389
EC Number	222-426-8
PubChem CID	18980
CompTox Dashboard (EPA)	DTXSID0044658
- InChI: InChI=1S/C8H7N3/c9-7-5-3-1-2-4-6(5)8(10)11-7/h1-4H,(H3,9,10,11) Key: RZVCEPSDYHAHLX-UHFFFAOYSA-N
- SMILES: C1=CC=C2C(=C1)C(=NC2=N)N

Properties
Chemical formula	C_{8}H_{7}N_{3}
Molar mass	145.165 g·mol^{−1}
- Except where otherwise noted, data are given for materials in their standard state (at 25 °C [77 °F], 100 kPa). Infobox references

1,3-Diiminoisoindoline is a dye precursor used in industry. The molecule can exist in different tautomers resulting in different crystalline solids.
