= 4,7-Dihydroisoindole =

Names
- Preferred IUPAC name 4,7-Dihydro-2H-isoindole

Identifiers
CAS Number	51649-34-4
3D model (JSmol)	Interactive image
ChemSpider	32988738
PubChem CID	16753087
UNII	AQE73KM486
CompTox Dashboard (EPA)	DTXSID801031464
- InChI: InChI=1S/C8H9N/c1-2-4-8-6-9-5-7(8)3-1/h1-2,5-6,9H,3-4H2 Key: DTLYTLITBQNWIL-UHFFFAOYSA-N
- SMILES: C1C=CCC2=CNC=C12

Properties
Chemical formula	C_{8}H_{9}N
Molar mass	119.167 g·mol^{−1}
- Except where otherwise noted, data are given for materials in their standard state (at 25 °C [77 °F], 100 kPa). Infobox references

4,7-Dihydroisoindole in heterocyclic chemistry is a reduced form of isoindole. 4,7-Dihydroisoindole is a useful building block for extended porphyrins which are relevant as materials for optical applications.

== Synthesis ==
An early attempt to access 4,7-dihydroisoindole — the closest relative of thermodynamically unstable isoindole was performed 1985. It was based on the classical Paal-Knorr synthesis under conditions which probably harmed the electron-rich pyrrole ring. Observed instability of 4,7-dihydroisoindole led researchers to conclude that it was not a useful intermediate in the porphyrin chemistry.

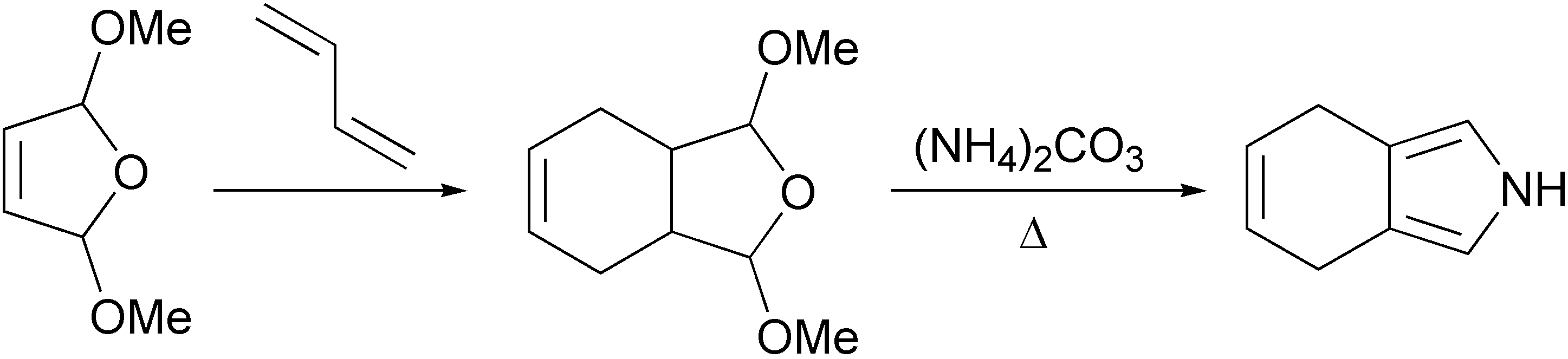

It turned out that changing the conditions made it possible to isolate 4,7-dihydroisoindole. Three-step synthesis starting from tosylacetylene which includes Diels-Alder reaction, Barton-Zard synthesis and thermal decarboxylation was reported.

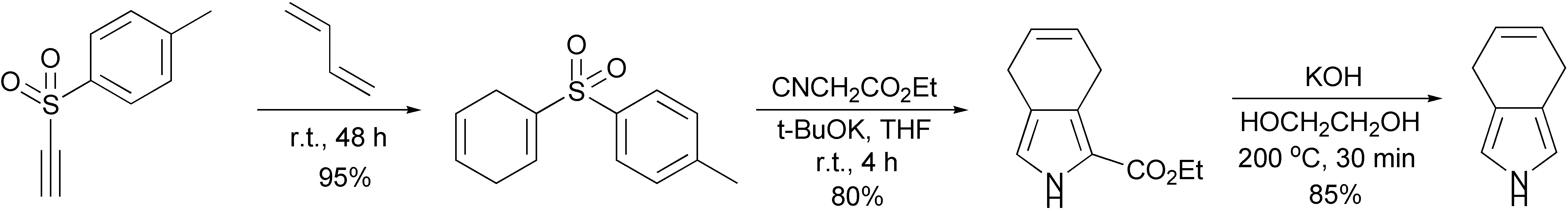

== Properties ==
Though it was expected that under acidic or basic conditions the migration of double bond in 4,7-dihydroisoindole would happen, this does not take when either strong bases (potassium tert-butoxide, potassium hydroxide) or acids (trifluoroacetic acid, p-toluenesulfonic acid) are involved. A likely reason for such stability is that the pyrrolic residue is more acidic (as NH-acid) as well as more nucleophilic than the respective reaction centers involved in the anticipated double bond migration; thus, the pyrrolic ring may serve to protect the double bond from the initiation of both carbocationic and carbanionic shifts.

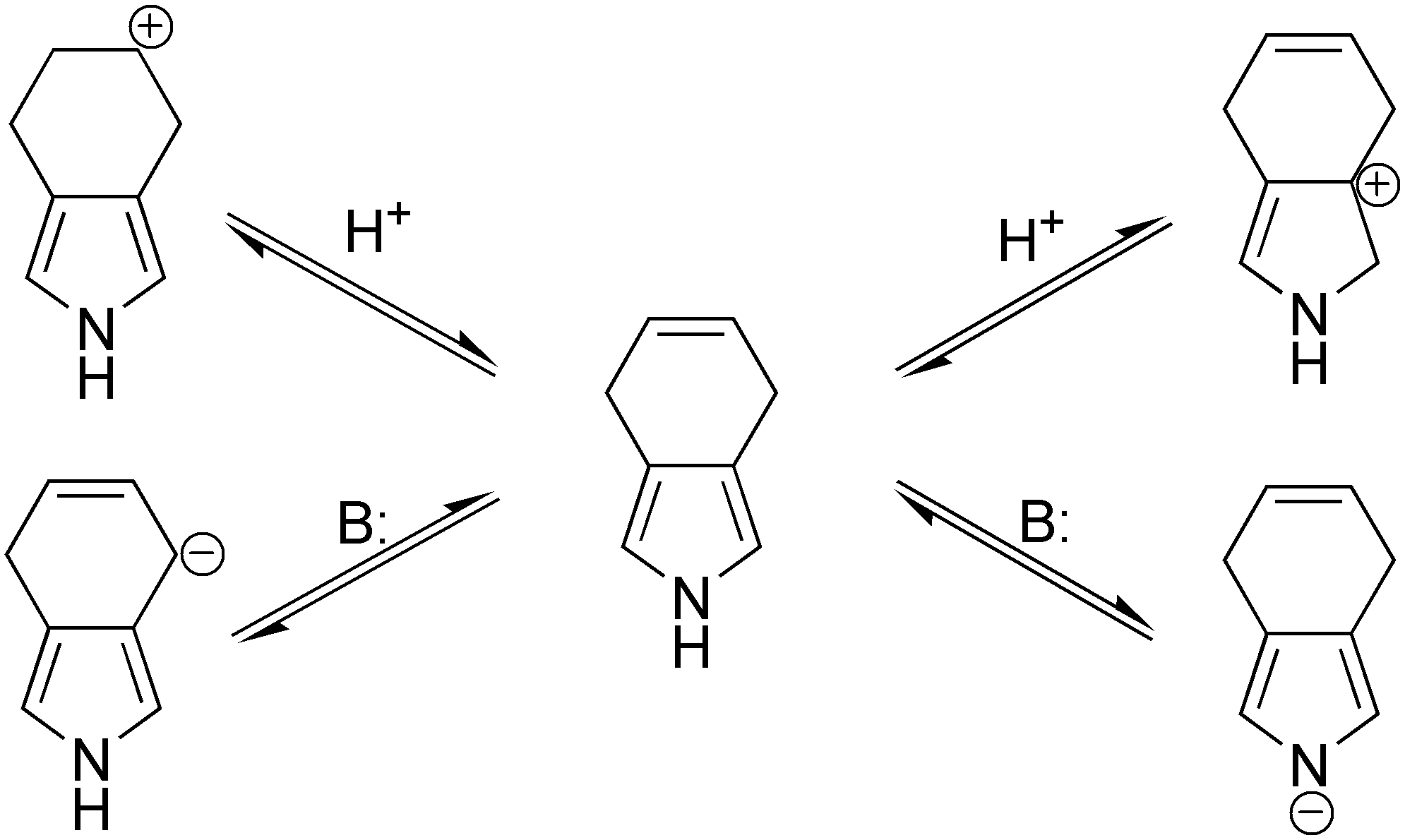

== Application for synthesis of porphyrins ==
4,7-Dihydroisoindole is universally a synthon of extended porphyrins, since its isolated double bond in the annelated cyclohexene ring can allow for modification by addition or cycloaddition reactions. Addition reactions can furnish new intermediates for benzosubstituted tetrabenzoporphyrins, while the use of cycloaddition reactions can lead to new tetranaphthoporphyrins.

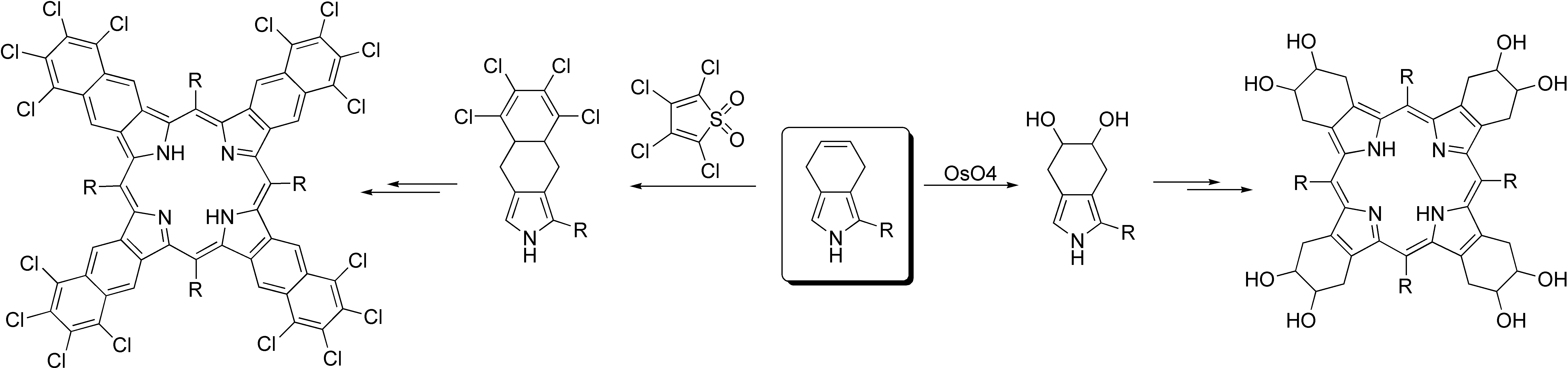
Use of 4,7-dihydroisoindole as a common precursor in porphyrin synthesis

== See also ==
- Paal-Knorr synthesis
- Barton-Zard synthesis
- Decarboxylation
