= Phthalocyanine =

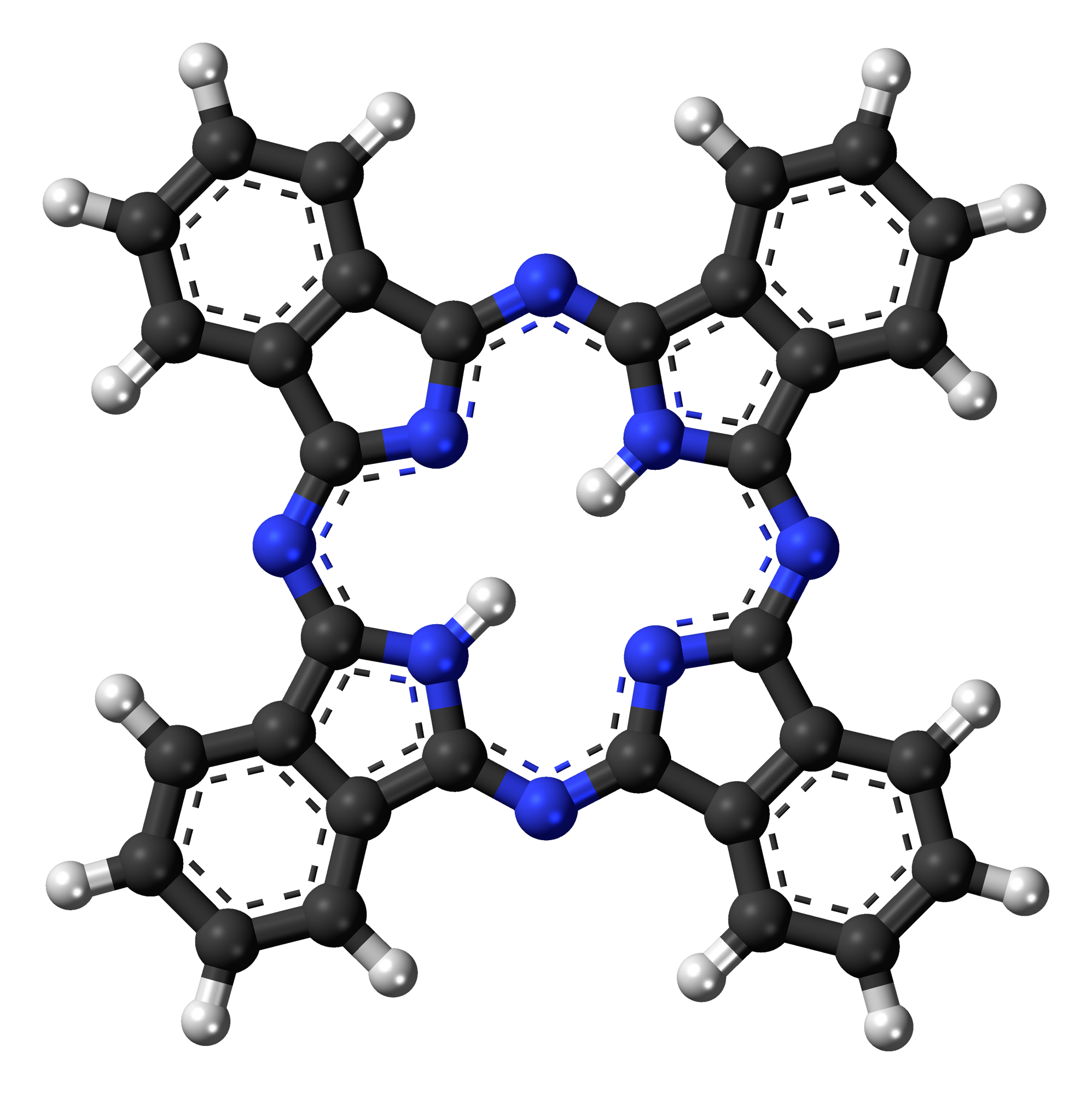

Names
- IUPAC name Phthalocyanine
- Systematic IUPAC name Tetrabenzo[b,g,l,q]-5,10,15,20-tetraazaporphyrin
- Other names: Phthalocyanin; Pigment Blue 16

Identifiers
| CAS Number | 574-93-6 |
| 3D model (JSmol) | Interactive image |
| ChEBI | CHEBI:34921 |
| ChemSpider | 4445497 |
| ECHA InfoCard | 100.008.527 |
| PubChem CID | 5282330 |
| UNII | V5PUF4VLGY |
| CompTox Dashboard (EPA) | DTXSID9025906 |
- InChI: InChI=1S/C32H18N8/c1-2-10-18-17(9-1)25-33-26(18)38-28-21-13-5-6-14-22(21)30(35-28)40-32-24-16-8-7-15-23(24)31(36-32)39-29-20-12-4-3-11-19(20)27(34-29)37-25/h1-16H,(H2,33,34,35,36,37,38,39,40) Key: IEQIEDJGQAUEQZ-UHFFFAOYSA-N; InChI=1/C32H18N8/c1-2-10-18-17(9-1)25-33-26(18)38-28-21-13-5-6-14-22(21)30(35-28)40-32-24-16-8-7-15-23(24)31(36-32)39-29-20-12-4-3-11-19(20)27(34-29)37-25/h1-16H,(H2,33,34,35,36,37,38,39,40) Key: IEQIEDJGQAUEQZ-UHFFFAOYAC
- SMILES: C1=CC=C2C(=C1)C3=NC4=C5C=CC=CC5=C(N4)N=C6C7=CC=CC=C7C(=N6)N=C8C9=CC=CC=C9C(=N8)N=C2N3

Properties
| Chemical formula | C_{32}H_{18}N_{8} |
| Molar mass | 514.552 g·mol^{−1} |

Hazards
- GHS labelling
| Pictograms | (GHS07: Exclamation mark) |
- Except where otherwise noted, data are given for materials in their standard state (at 25 °C [77 °F], 100 kPa). verify (what is ?) Infobox references

Phthalocyanine (H_{2}Pc) is a large, aromatic, macrocyclic, organic compound with the formula (C_{8}H_{4}N_{2})_{4}H_{2}. It is of theoretical or specialized interest in chemical dyes and photoelectricity.

It is composed of four isoindole units (Note: One "isoindole unit" is C_{8}H_{4}N_{2}; four in a nitrogen-ring configuration are abbreviated as symbol Pc = (C_{8}H_{4}N_{2})_{4} .) linked by a ring of nitrogen atoms. (C_{8}H_{4}N_{2})_{4}H_{2} = H_{2}Pc has a two-dimensional geometry and a ring system consisting of 18 π-electrons. The extensive delocalization of the π-electrons affords the molecule useful properties, lending itself to applications in dyes and pigments. Metal complexes derived from Pc^{2−}, the conjugate base of H_{2}Pc, are valuable in catalysis, organic solar cells, and photodynamic therapy.

== Properties ==
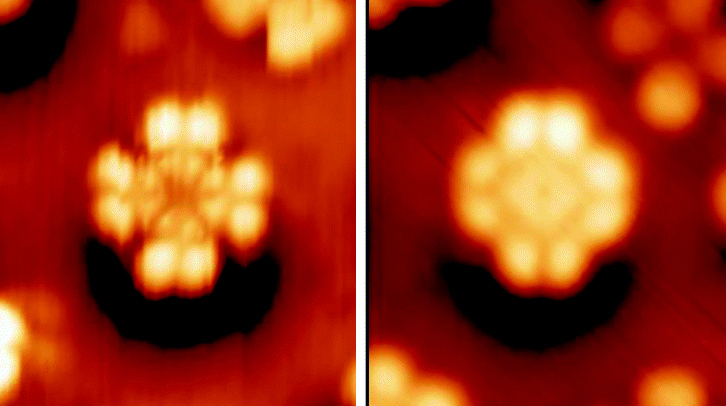
STM images of individual phthalocyanine molecules recorded at a bias of −2 V (left) and +1 V (right). Note that STM probes density of electrons in the HOMO/LUMO bands rather than atomic profiles.

Phthalocyanine and derived metal complexes (MPc) tend to aggregate and, thus, have low solubility in common solvents. Benzene at 40 °C dissolves less than a milligram of H_{2}Pc or CuPc per litre. H_{2}Pc and CuPc dissolve easily in sulfuric acid due to the protonation of the nitrogen atoms bridging the pyrrole rings. Many phthalocyanine compounds are, thermally, very stable and do not melt but can be sublimed. CuPc sublimes at above 500 °C under inert gases (nitrogen, CO_{2}). Substituted phthalocyanine complexes often have much higher solubility. They are less thermally stable and often can not be sublimed. Unsubstituted phthalocyanines strongly absorb light between 600 and 700 nm, thus these materials are blue or green. Substitution can shift the absorption towards longer wavelengths, changing color from pure blue to green to colorless (when the absorption is in the near infrared).

There are many derivatives of the parent phthalocyanine, where either carbon atoms of the macrocycle are exchanged for nitrogen atoms, such as tetrapyrazinoporphyrazine, or the peripheral hydrogen atoms are substituted by functional groups like halogens, hydroxyl, amine, alkyl, aryl, thiol, alkoxy and nitrosyl groups. These modifications allow for the tuning of the electrochemical properties of the molecule such as absorption and emission wavelengths and conductance.

== History ==
In 1907, an unidentified blue compound, now known to be phthalocyanine, was reported. In 1927, Swiss researchers serendipitously discovered copper phthalocyanine, copper naphthalocyanine, and copper octamethylphthalocyanine in an attempted conversion of o-dibromobenzene into phthalonitrile. They remarked on the enormous stability of these complexes but did not further characterize them. In the same year, iron phthalocyanine was discovered at Scottish Dyes of Grangemouth, Scotland (later ICI). It was not until 1934 that Sir Patrick Linstead characterized the chemical and structural properties of iron phthalocyanine.

== Synthesis ==
Phthalocyanine is formed through the cyclotetramerization of various phthalic acid derivatives including phthalonitrile, diiminoisoindole, phthalic anhydride, and phthalimides. Alternatively, heating phthalic anhydride in the presence of urea yields H_{2}Pc. Using such methods, approximately 57,000 tonnes (63,000 Imperial tons) of various phthalocyanines were produced in 1985. More often, MPc is synthesized rather than H_{2}Pc due to the greater research interest in the former. To prepare these complexes, the phthalocyanine synthesis is conducted in the presence of metal salts. Two copper phthalocyanines are shown in the figure below.

Halogenated and sulfonated derivatives of copper phthalocyanines are commercially important as dyes. Such compounds are prepared by treating CuPc with chlorine, bromine or oleum.

== Applications ==
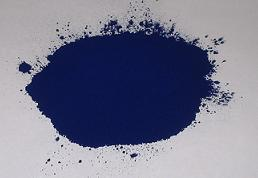
Sample of copper phthalocyanine, illustrating the intense color characteristic of phthalocyanine derivatives.

At the initial discovery of Pc, its uses were primarily limited to dyes and pigments. Modification of the substituents attached to the peripheral rings allows for the tuning of the absorption and emission properties of Pc to yield differently colored dyes and pigments. There has since been significant research on H_{2}Pc and MPc resulting in a wide range of applications in areas including photovoltaics, photodynamic therapy, nanoparticle construction, and catalysis. The electrochemical properties of MPc make them effective electron-donors and -acceptors. As a result, MPc-based organic solar cells with power conversion efficiencies at or below 5% have been developed. Furthermore, MPcs have been used as catalysts for the oxidation of methane, phenols, alcohols, polysaccharides, and olefins; MPcs can also be used to catalyze C–C bond formation and various reduction reactions. Silicon and zinc phthalocyanines have been developed as photosensitizers for non-invasive cancer treatment.

Various MPcs have also shown the ability to form nanostructures, including integration into conductive metal−organic frameworks, which have potential applications in electronics and biosensing. Phthalocyanine is also used on some recordable DVDs.

== Related compounds ==
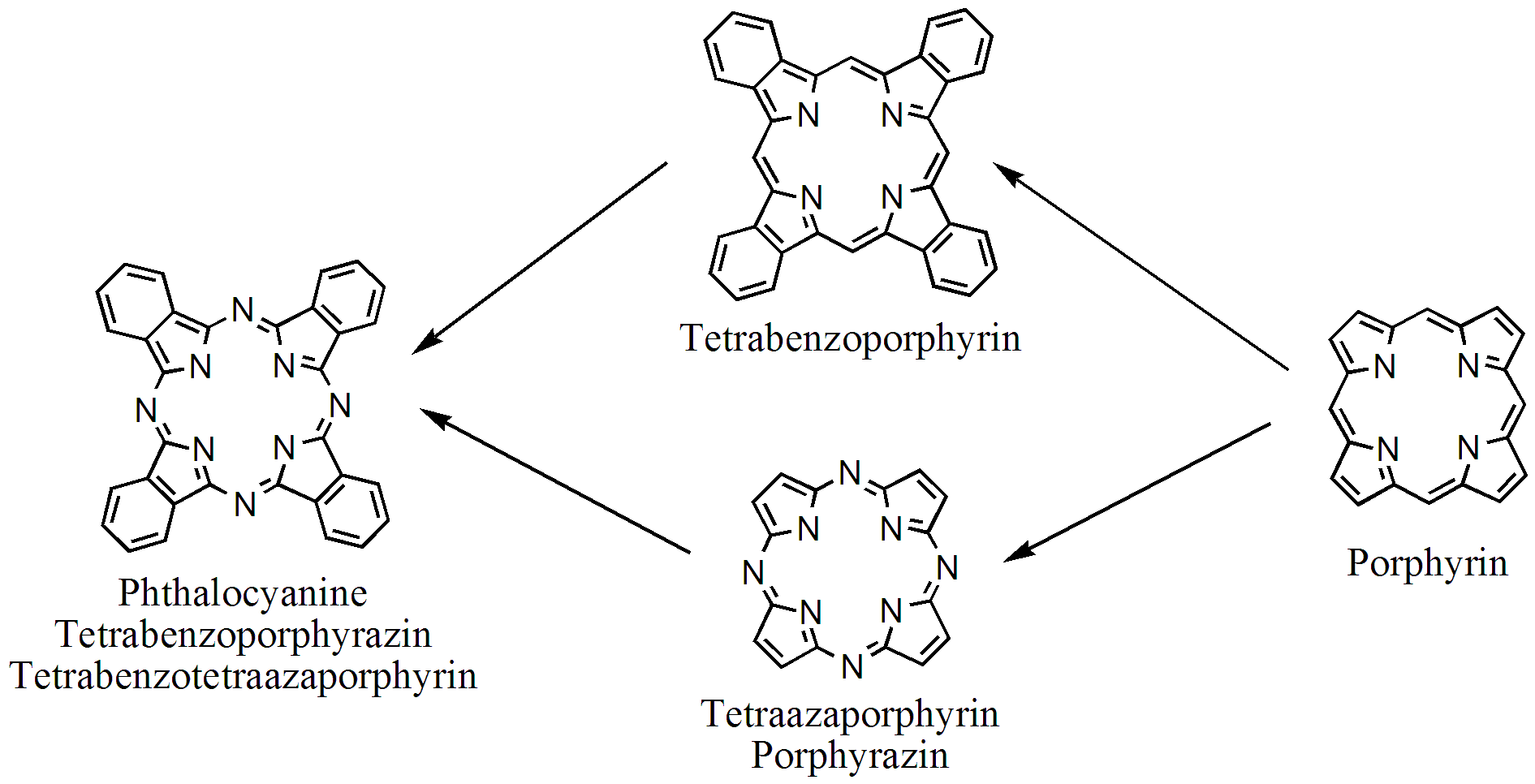
Relationship of the phthalocyanine with the porphyrin macrocycle. Two intramacrocyclic N-H groups are omitted.

Phthalocyanines are structurally related to other tetrapyrrole macrocyles including porphyrins and porphyrazines. They feature four pyrrole-like subunits linked to form a 16 membered inner ring composed of alternating carbon and nitrogen atoms. Structurally larger analogues include naphthalocyanines. The pyrrole-like rings within H_{2}Pc are closely related to isoindole. Both porphyrins and phthalocyanines function as planar tetradentate dianionic ligands that bind metals through four inwardly projecting nitrogen centers. Such complexes are formally derivatives of Pc^{2−}, the conjugate base of H_{2}Pc.

== Soluble phthalocyanines ==
Of fundamental but little practical value, soluble phthalocyanines have been prepared. Long alkyl chains can be added to improve their solubility in organic solvents. Soluble derivatives can be used for spin-coating or drop-casting. Alternatively, introducing ionic or hydrophilic groups into the structure can confer water solubility.

Solubilization can also be achieved through axial coordination. For instance, the axial ligand functionalization of silicon phthalocyanine has been extensively studied.

== Toxicity and hazards ==
No evidence has been reported for acute toxicity or carcinogenicity of phthalocyanine compounds. The LD_{50} (rats, oral) is 10 g/kg.
