= Phthalonitrile =

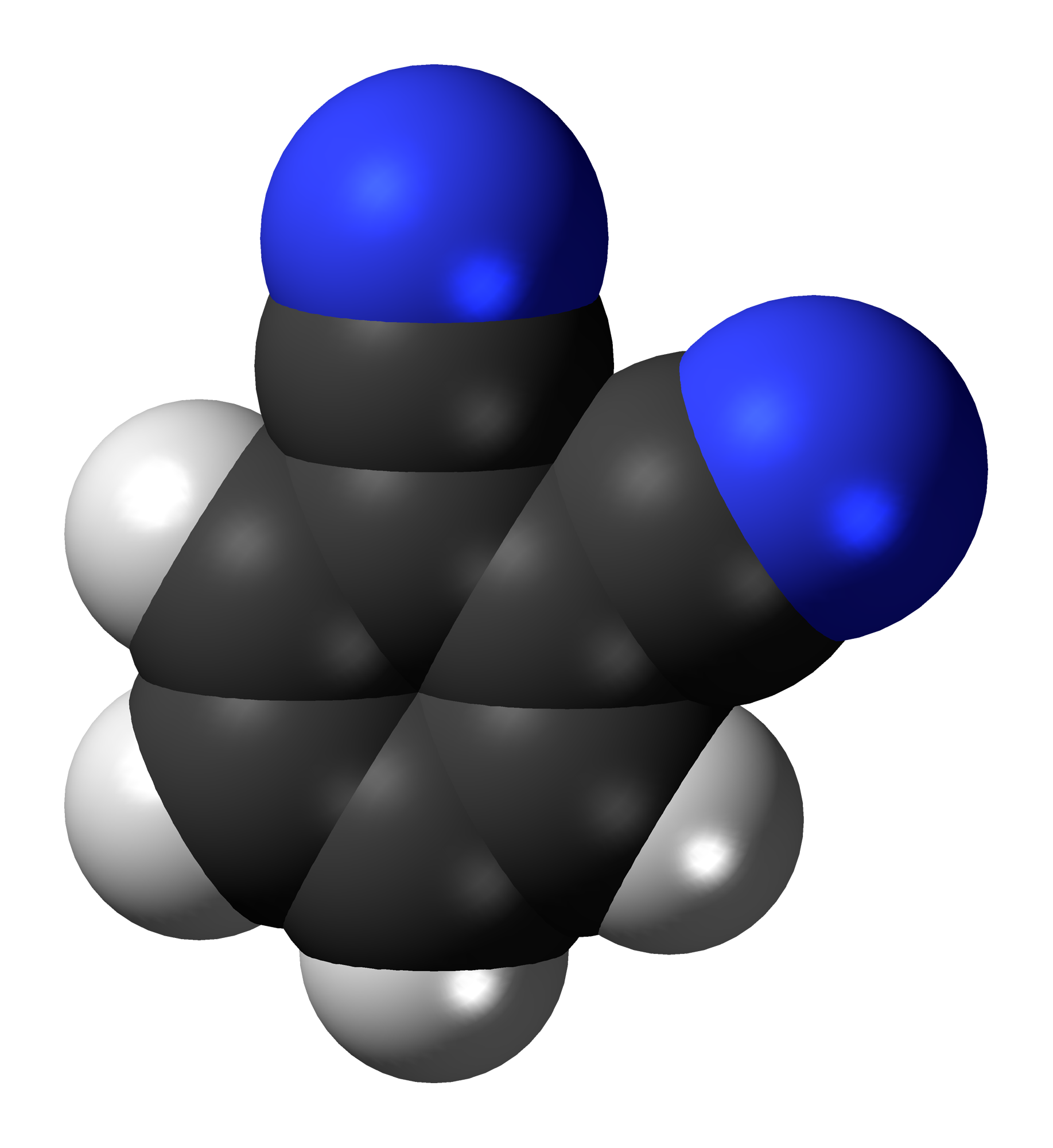

Names
- Preferred IUPAC name Benzene-1,2-dicarbonitrile
- Other names Phthalonitrile; Phthalodinitrile; 1,2-Benzenedicarbonitrile; 1,2-Dicyanobenzene

Identifiers
| CAS Number | 91-15-6 |
| 3D model (JSmol) | Interactive image |
| ChEBI | CHEBI:232056 |
| ChemSpider | 6775 |
| ECHA InfoCard | 100.001.859 |
| PubChem CID | 7042 |
| UNII | 978627YAJU |
| CompTox Dashboard (EPA) | DTXSID8029604 |
- InChI: InChI=1S/C8H4N2/c9-5-7-3-1-2-4-8(7)6-10/h1-4H Key: XQZYPMVTSDWCCE-UHFFFAOYSA-N; InChI=1/C8H4N2/c9-5-7-3-1-2-4-8(7)6-10/h1-4H Key: XQZYPMVTSDWCCE-UHFFFAOYAX
- SMILES: N#Cc1ccccc1C#N

Properties
| Chemical formula | C_{6}H_{4}(CN)_{2} |
| Molar mass | 128.13 g/mol |
| Appearance | Off-white crystals with lumps on the surface. |
| Odor | Almond-like |
| Density | 1.238 g/cm^{3} |
| Melting point | 139 to 141 °C (282 to 286 °F; 412 to 414 K) |
| Boiling point | sublimes |
- Except where otherwise noted, data are given for materials in their standard state (at 25 °C [77 °F], 100 kPa). verify (what is ?) Infobox references

Phthalonitrile is an organic compound with the formula C_{6}H_{4}(CN)_{2}, which is an off-white crystal solid at room temperature. It is a derivative of benzene, containing two adjacent nitrile groups. The compound has low solubility in water but is soluble in common organic solvents. The compound is used as a precursor to phthalocyanine and other pigments, fluorescent brighteners, and photographic sensitizers.

== Synthesis ==
Phthalonitrile is produced industrially in a single-stage continuous process, by the ammoxidation of o-xylene at 480 °C. The reaction is catalyzed by vanadium antimony oxide in a fluidized bed reactor.

Phthalonitrile was first described in 1896 by Johannes Pinnow. It was noted as a byproduct of the synthesis of ortho-dicyanodiazoamidobenzene via the reaction of ortho-amidobenzonitrile hydrochloride, sodium nitrite, and hydrochloric acid. The first intentional synthesis involved dehydration of phthalamide by boiling in acetic anhydride. Another synthesis of historical interest is the Rosenmund von Braun reaction in which an ortho substituted dihalobenzene is treated with copper(I) cyanide, which results in the halide groups being replaced by cyano groups.

== Applications ==
Phthalonitrile is the precursor to phthalocyanine pigments, a very common organic pigment. Such pigments are generated through the reaction of phthalonitrile with various metal precursors. The reaction is carried out in a solvent at around 180 °C.

Ammonolysis of phthalonitrile gives to diiminoisoindoline. This intermediate condensation with active methylene compounds to give commercially important pigment yellow 185 and pigment yellow 139.
