= Indoline =

- Indoline

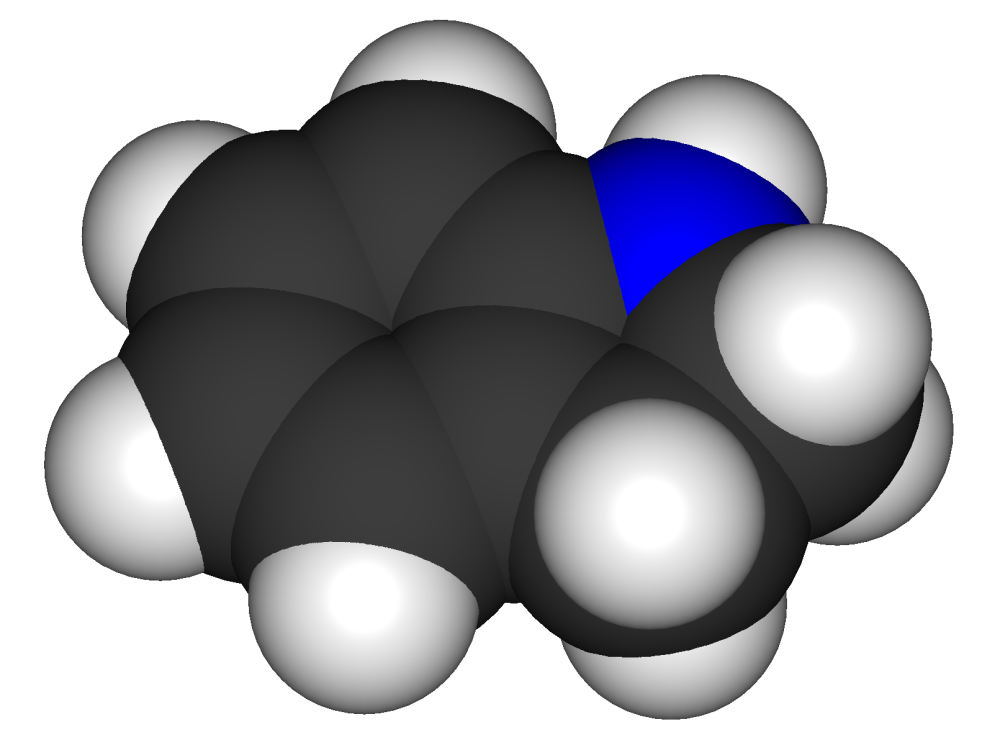
- Indoline

Names
- Preferred IUPAC name 2,3-Dihydro-1H-indole
- Other names 2,3-Dihydroindole

Identifiers
CAS Number	496-15-1
3D model (JSmol)	Interactive image
Beilstein Reference	111915
ChEBI	CHEBI:43295
ChEMBL	ChEMBL388803
ChemSpider	9905
ECHA InfoCard	100.007.107
EC Number	207-816-8
Gmelin Reference	27284
PubChem CID	10328
RTECS number	NL6906300
UNII	6DPT9AB2NK
CompTox Dashboard (EPA)	DTXSID9052133
- InChI: InChI=1S/C8H9N/c1-2-4-8-7(3-1)5-6-9-8/h1-4,9H,5-6H2 Key: LPAGFVYQRIESJQ-UHFFFAOYSA-N; InChI=1/C8H9N/c1-2-4-8-7(3-1)5-6-9-8/h1-4,9H,5-6H2 Key: LPAGFVYQRIESJQ-UHFFFAOYAF
- SMILES: c1cccc2c1CCN2

Properties
Chemical formula	C_{8}H_{9}N
Molar mass	119.16 g/mol
Appearance	Clear colourless liquid
Density	1.063 g/mL
Melting point	−21 °C (−6 °F; 252 K)
Boiling point	220 to 221 °C (428 to 430 °F; 493 to 494 K)

Hazards
Flash point	92.8 °C (199.0 °F; 365.9 K)
Safety data sheet (SDS)	Fisher Scientific

Related compounds
Related aromatics	carbazole, indole, isoindoline, oxindole
- Except where otherwise noted, data are given for materials in their standard state (at 25 °C [77 °F], 100 kPa). verify (what is ?) Infobox references

Indoline is an aromatic heterocyclic organic compound with the chemical formulation C_{8}H_{9}N. It has a bicyclic structure, consisting of a six-membered benzene ring fused to a five-membered nitrogen-containing ring. The compound is based on the indole structure, but the 2-3 bond is saturated. By oxidation/dehydrogenation it can be converted to indole.

Indoline can be produced from the reaction of indole, zinc and 85% phosphoric acid. It was used to make Indocaine.
