= Isoindoline =

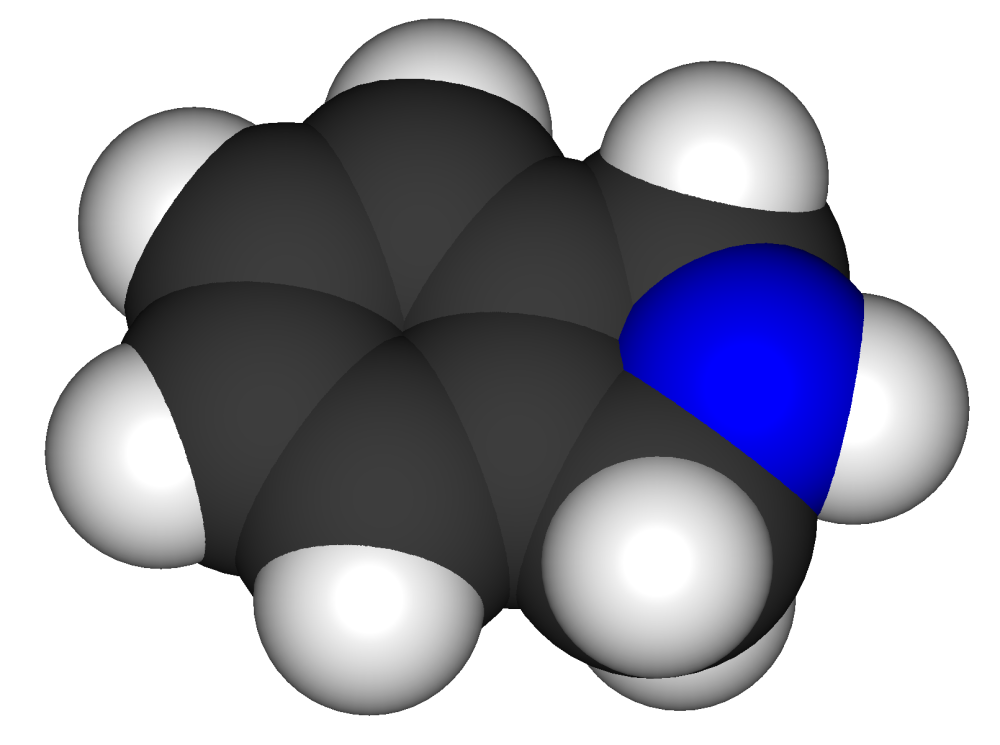
3D representation of isoindoline

Names
- Preferred IUPAC name 2,3-Dihydro-1H-isoindole

Identifiers
CAS Number	496-12-8
3D model (JSmol)	Interactive image
ChemSpider	373951
ECHA InfoCard	100.156.955
PubChem CID	422478
UNII	4G7B55YCK6
CompTox Dashboard (EPA)	DTXSID20964291
- InChI: InChI=1S/C8H9N/c1-2-4-8-6-9-5-7(8)3-1/h1-4,9H,5-6H2 Key: GWVMLCQWXVFZCN-UHFFFAOYSA-N; InChI=1/C8H9N/c1-2-4-8-6-9-5-7(8)3-1/h1-4,9H,5-6H2 Key: GWVMLCQWXVFZCN-UHFFFAOYAS
- SMILES: c1cccc2c1CNC2

Properties
Chemical formula	C_{8}H_{9}N
Molar mass	119.167 g·mol^{−1}
- Except where otherwise noted, data are given for materials in their standard state (at 25 °C [77 °F], 100 kPa). verify (what is ?) Infobox references

Isoindoline is a heterocyclic organic compound with the molecular formula C_{8}H_{9}N. The parent compound has a bicyclic structure, consisting of a six-membered benzene ring fused to a five-membered nitrogen-containing ring. The compound's structure is similar to indoline except that the nitrogen atom is in the 2 position instead of the 1 position of the five-membered ring. Isoindoline itself is not commonly encountered, but several derivatives are found in nature and some synthetic derivatives are commercially valuable drugs, e.g. lenalidomide and pazinaclone.

The drug lenalidomide contains the substructure isoindoline (red)

== Substituted isoindolines ==
1-Substituted isoindolines and isoindolinones are chiral. Isoindolylcarboxylic acid and 1,3-disubstituted isoindolines are constituents of some pharmaceuticals and natural products. Isoindolines can be prepared by 1,2-addition of a nucleophile onto a bifunctional ε-benzoiminoenoates followed by intramolecular aza-Michael reaction. Another route involves [3+2] cycloaddition of the azomethine ylides (e.g. (CH_{2})_{2}NR) to quinone in the presence of suitable catalysts. These methods have also been adapted to give chiral derivatives.

== Related compounds ==
- 4,7-Dihydroisoindole
- Indole
- Indene
- Indoline
- Benzofuran
- Carbazole
- Carboline
- Isatin
- Methylindole
- Oxindole
- Pyrrole
- Skatole
- Benzene
