= Heterocyclic compound =

Molecule with one or more rings composed of different elements

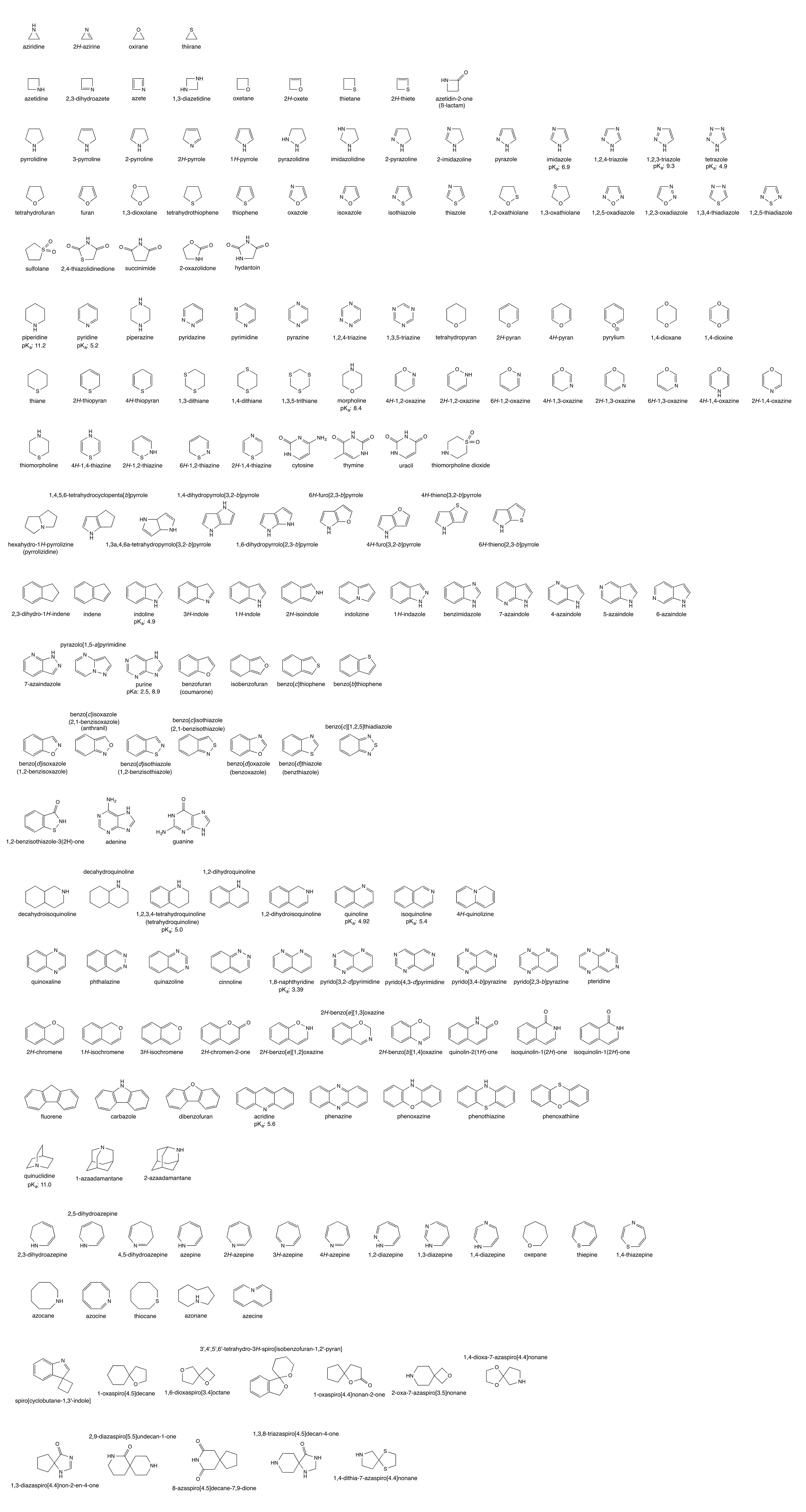
Structures and names of common heterocyclic compounds

Pyridine, a heterocyclic compound

A heterocyclic compound or ring structure is a hydrocarbon-based cyclic compound that contains at least one heteroatom as member(s) of its ring(s). Heterocyclic organic chemistry is the branch of organic chemistry dealing with the synthesis, properties, and applications of organic heterocycles.

Examples of heterocyclic compounds include all of the nucleic acids, the majority of drugs, most biomass (cellulose and related materials), and many natural and synthetic dyes. More than half of known compounds are heterocycles. 59% of US FDA-approved drugs contain nitrogen heterocycles.

== Classification ==
The study of organic heterocyclic chemistry focuses especially on organic unsaturated derivatives, and the preponderance of work and applications involves unstrained organic 5- and 6-membered rings. Included are pyridine, thiophene, pyrrole, and furan. Another large class of organic heterocycles refers to those fused to benzene rings. For example, the fused benzene derivatives of pyridine, thiophene, pyrrole, and furan are quinoline, benzothiophene, indole, and benzofuran, respectively. The fusion of two benzene rings gives rise to a third large family of organic compounds. Analogs of the previously mentioned heterocycles for this third family of compounds are acridine, dibenzothiophene, carbazole, and dibenzofuran, respectively.

Heterocyclic organic compounds can be usefully classified based on their electronic structure. The saturated organic heterocycles behave like the acyclic derivatives. Thus, piperidine and tetrahydrofuran are conventional amines and ethers, with modified steric profiles. Therefore, the study of organic heterocyclic chemistry focuses on organic unsaturated rings.

=== Inorganic rings ===
Some heterocycles contain no carbon. Examples are borazine (B_{3}N_{3} ring), hexachlorophosphazene (P_{3}N_{3} ring), and trithiazyl trichloride (S_{3}N_{3} ring). In comparison with organic heterocycles, which have numerous commercial applications, inorganic ring systems are mainly of theoretical interest. IUPAC recommends the Hantzsch-Widman nomenclature for naming heterocyclic compounds.

== Notes on lists ==
- "Heteroatoms" are atoms in the ring other than carbon atoms.
- Names in italics are retained by IUPAC and do not follow the Hantzsch-Widman nomenclature.
- Some of the names refer to classes of compounds rather than individual compounds.
- Also no attempt is made to list isomers.

== 3-membered rings ==
Although subject to ring strain, 3-membered heterocyclic rings are well characterized.

Three-membered rings with one heteroatom
Heteroatom	Saturated	Unsaturated
Boron	Borirane	Borirene
Nitrogen	Aziridine	Azirine
Oxygen	Oxirane (ethylene oxide, epoxides)	Oxirene
Silicon	Silirane	Silirene
Phosphorus	Phosphirane	Phosphirene
Sulfur	Thiirane (ethylene sulfide, episulfides)	Thiirene
Three-membered rings with two heteroatoms
Heteroatoms	Saturated	Unsaturated
2 × Nitrogen	Diaziridine	Diazirine
Nitrogen + Oxygen	Oxaziridine	Oxazirine
Nitrogen + Sulfur	Thiaziridine	Thiazirine
2 × Oxygen	Dioxirane (highly unstable)	- - - - -
2 × Sulfur	Dithiirane (highly unstable)	- - - - -

== 4-membered rings ==
Four-membered rings with one heteroatom
Heteroatom	Saturated	Unsaturated
Boron	Boretane	Borete
Nitrogen	Azetidine	Azete
Oxygen	Oxetane	Oxete
Silicon	Siletane	Silete
Phosphorus	Phosphetane	Phosphete
Sulfur	Thietane	Thiete
Four-membered rings with two heteroatoms
Heteroatoms	Saturated	Unsaturated
2 × Nitrogen	Diazetidine	Diazete
2 × Oxygen	Dioxetane	Dioxete
2 × Sulfur	Dithietane	Dithiete
Phosphorus + Oxygen	Oxaphosphetane	Oxaphosphete

== 5-membered rings ==
The 5-membered ring compounds containing two heteroatoms, at least one of which is nitrogen, are collectively called the azoles. Thiazoles and isothiazoles contain a sulfur and a nitrogen atom in the ring. Dithioles have two sulfur atoms.

A large group of 5-membered ring compounds with three or more heteroatoms also exists. One example is the class of dithiazoles, which contain two sulfur atoms and one nitrogen atom.

Five-membered rings with one heteroatom
Heteroatom	Saturated	Unsaturated
Boron	Borolane	Borole
Nitrogen	Pyrrolidine (Azolidine not used)	Pyrrole (Azole not used); Pyrroline (partially unsaturated)
Oxygen	Oxolane	Furan (Oxole not used)
Silicon	Silolane	Silole
Phosphorus	Phospholane	Phosphole
Sulfur	Thiolane	Thiophene (Thiole not used)
Germanium	Germolane	Germole
Arsenic	Arsolane	Arsole
Selenium	Selenolane	Selenophene
Tin	Stannolane	Stannole
Antimony	Stibolane	Stibole
Tellurium	Tellurolane	Tellurophene
Lead	Plumbolane	Plumbole
Bismuth	Bismolane	Bismole
Five-membered rings with two heteroatoms
Heteroatoms	Saturated	Unsaturated (and partially unsaturated)
2 × Nitrogen	Pyrazolidine; Imidazolidine	Pyrazole (Pyrazoline); Imidazole (Imidazoline)
Nitrogen + Oxygen	Oxazolidine; Isoxazolidine	Oxazole (Oxazoline); Isoxazole (Isoxazoline)
Nitrogen + Sulfur	Thiazolidine; Isothiazolidine	Thiazole (Thiazoline); Isothiazole (Isothiazoline)
Oxygen + Sulfur	Oxathiolane; Isoxathiolane	Oxathiole; Isoxathiole
2 × Oxygen	Dioxolane	Dioxole
2 × Sulfur	Dithiolane	Dithiole
Five-membered rings with three heteroatoms
Heteroatoms	Unsaturated	
3 × Nitrogen	Triazole	
2 Nitrogen + Oxygen	Oxadiazole	
2 Nitrogen + Sulfur	Thiadiazole	
Nitrogen + 2 Oxygen	Dioxazole	
Nitrogen + 2 Sulfur	Dithiazole	
Five-membered rings with four heteroatoms
Heteroatoms	Unsaturated	
4 × Nitrogen	Tetrazole	
3 Nitrogen + Oxygen	Oxatriazole	
3 Nitrogen + Sulfur	Thiatriazole	
Five-membered rings with five heteroatoms
Heteroatoms	Unsaturated	
5 × Nitrogen	Pentazole	
4 Nitrogen + Oxygen	Oxatetrazole	
4 Nitrogen + Sulfur	Thiatetrazole	

== 6-membered rings ==
The 6-membered ring compounds containing two heteroatoms, at least one of which is nitrogen, are collectively called the azines. Thiazines contain a sulfur and a nitrogen atom in the ring. Dithiines have two sulfur atoms.

Six-membered rings with one heteroatom
Heteroatom	Saturated	Unsaturated	Ions
Boron	Borinane	Borinine	Boratabenzene anion
Nitrogen	Piperidine (Azinane not used)	Pyridine (Azine not used)	Pyridinium cation
Oxygen	Oxane	Pyran (Oxine not used)	Pyrylium cation
Silicon	Silinane	Siline	- - - - -
Phosphorus	Phosphinane	Phosphinine	Phosphininium cation
Sulfur	Thiane	Thiopyran (Thiine not used)	Thiopyrylium cation
Germanium	Germinane	Germine	- - - - -
Arsenic	Arsinane	Arsinine	Arsatabenzene cation
Selenium	Selenane	Selenopyran	Selenopyrylium cation
Tin	Stanninane	Stannine	- - - - -
Antimony	Stibinane	Stibinine	Stibatabenzene cation
Tellurium	Tellurane	Telluropyran	Telluropyrylium cation
Lead	Plumbinane	Plumbine	- - - - -
Bismuth	Bisminane	Bismine	Bismatabenzene cation
Six-membered rings with two heteroatoms
Heteroatoms	Saturated	Unsaturated	
2 × Nitrogen	Piperazine	Pyrazine; Pyrimidine; Pyridazine	
Nitrogen + Oxygen	Morpholine	Oxazine	
Nitrogen + Sulfur	Thiomorpholine	Thiazine	
Oxygen + Sulfur	Oxathiane	Oxathiin	
2 × Oxygen	Dioxane	Dioxin	
2 × Sulfur	Dithiane	Dithiin	
Nitrogen + Boron	Azaborinane	Azaborine	
Six-membered rings with three heteroatoms
Heteroatoms	Saturated	Unsaturated	
3 × Nitrogen	Triazinane	Triazine	
3 × Oxygen	Trioxane	Trioxin	
3 × Sulfur	Trithiane	Trithiin	
2 Nitrogen + 1 Sulfur	Thiadiazinane	Thiadiazine	
Six-membered rings with four heteroatoms
Heteroatoms	Unsaturated		
4 × Nitrogen	Tetrazine		
2 Nitrogen + 2 Boron	Carborazine		

Six-membered rings with five heteroatoms
The hypothetical chemical compound with five nitrogen heteroatoms would be pentazine.

Six-membered rings with six heteroatoms
The hypothetical chemical compound with six nitrogen heteroatoms would be hexazine. Borazine is a six-membered ring with three nitrogen heteroatoms and three boron heteroatoms.

== 7-membered rings ==
In a 7-membered ring, the heteroatom must be able to provide an empty π-orbital (e.g. boron) for "normal" aromatic stabilization to be available; otherwise, homoaromaticity may be possible.

Seven-membered rings with one heteroatom
Heteroatom	Saturated	Unsaturated
Boron	Borepane	Borepine
Nitrogen	Azepane	Azepine
Oxygen	Oxepane	Oxepine
Silicon	Silepane	Silepine
Phosphorus	Phosphepane	Phosphepine
Sulfur	Thiepane	Thiepine
Seven-membered rings with two heteroatoms
Heteroatoms	Saturated	Unsaturated
2 × Nitrogen	Diazepane	Diazepine
Nitrogen + Oxygen	Oxazepane	Oxazepine
Nitrogen + Sulfur	Thiazepane	Thiazepine

== 8-membered rings ==
Heteroatom	Saturated	Unsaturated
Nitrogen	Azocane	Azocine
Oxygen	Oxocane	Oxocine
Sulfur	Thiocane	Thiocine

Borazocine is an eight-membered ring with four nitrogen heteroatoms and four boron heteroatoms.

== 9-membered rings ==
Heteroatom	Saturated	Unsaturated
Nitrogen	Azonane	Azonine
Oxygen	Oxonane	Oxonine
Sulfur	Thionane	Thionine

== Images of rings with one heteroatom ==
	Saturated			Unsaturated		
Heteroatom	Nitrogen	Oxygen	Sulfur	Nitrogen	Oxygen	Sulfur
3-atom ring	Aziridine	Oxirane	Thiirane	Azirine	Oxirene	Thiirene
3-atom ring	Structure of aziridine	Structure of oxirane	Structure of thiirane	Structure of azirine	Structure of oxirene	Structure of thiirene
4-atom ring	Azetidine	Oxetane	Thietane	Azete	Oxete	Thiete
4-atom ring	Structure of acetidine	Structure of oxetane	Structure of thietane	Structure of azete	Structure of oxete	Structure of thiete
5-atom ring	Pyrrolidine	Oxolane	Thiolane	Pyrrole	Furan	Thiophene
5-atom ring	Structure of pyrrolidine	Structure of oxolane	Structure of thiolane	Structure of pyrrole	Structure of furan	Structure of thiophene
6-atom ring	Piperidine	Oxane	Thiane	Pyridine	Pyran	Thiopyran
6-atom ring	Structure of piperidine	Structure of oxane	Structure of thiane	Structure of pyridine	Structure of pyran	Structure of thiopyran
7-atom ring	Azepane	Oxepane	Thiepane	Azepine	Oxepine	Thiepine
7-atom ring	Structure of azepane	Structure of oxepane	Structure of thiepane	Structure of azepine	Structure of oxepine	Structure of thiepine
8-atom ring	Azocane	Oxocane	Thiocane	Azocine	Oxocine	Thiocine
8-atom ring	Structure of azocane	Structure of oxocane	Structure of thiocane	Structure of azocine	Structure of oxocine	Structure of thiocine
9-atom ring	Azonane	Oxonane	Thionane	Azonine	Oxonine	Thionine
9-atom ring	Structure of azonane	Structure of oxonane	Structure of thionane	Structure of azonine	Structure of oxonine	Structure of thionine

== Fused/condensed rings ==
Heterocyclic rings systems that are formally derived by fusion with other rings, either carbocyclic or heterocyclic, have a variety of common and systematic names. For example, with the benzo-fused unsaturated nitrogen heterocycles, pyrrole provides indole or isoindole depending on the orientation. The pyridine derivative is quinoline or isoquinoline, and the class of analogues with two nitrogen atoms is known as the benzodiazines. For the azepine derivative, benzazepine is the preferred name. Likewise, the compounds with two benzene rings fused to the central heterocycle are carbazole, acridine, and dibenzoazepine. Heptazine is a tricyclic nitrogen-containing heterocyclic system derived by fusion of three triazine rings, and analog of the carbocycle phenalene.

== History of heterocyclic chemistry ==
The history of heterocyclic chemistry began in the 1800s, in step with the development of organic chemistry. Some noteworthy developments:

- 1818: Brugnatelli makes alloxan from uric acid.
- 1832: Döbereiner produces furfural (a furan) by treating starch with sulfuric acid.
- 1834: Runge obtains pyrrole ("fiery oil") by dry distillation of bones.
- 1906: Friedlander synthesizes indigo dye, allowing synthetic chemistry to displace a large agricultural industry.
- 1936: Treibs isolates chlorophyll derivatives from crude oil, explaining the biological origin of petroleum.
- 1951: Chargaff's rules are described, highlighting the role of heterocyclic compounds (purines and pyrimidines) in the genetic code.

== Uses ==
Heterocyclic compounds are pervasive in many areas of life sciences and technology. Many drugs are heterocyclic compounds. Among the modifications to the family of antitumor compounds, heterocyclic organic compounds have been extensively applied by many groups in order to modify the reactivity profile. Pyrrole, pyrimidine, indole, quinoline and purine are few classes of heterocycles which showed interesting cytotoxicity profiles, which can be highly beneficial when developing cancer drugs. Heterocyclic compounds play a central role in modern medicinal chemistry, with a large majority of newly approved drugs, containing at least one heterocyclic ring particularly nitrogen-containing systems. Their prevalence is attributed to their ability to modulate physicochemical properties such as solubility, lipophilicity, and binding affinity to biological targets.

== See also ==
- Spiroketals
