= C3H3N =

The molecular formula C_{3}H_{3}N (molar mass: 53.06 g/mol, exact mass: 53.0266 u) may refer to:

- Acrylonitrile
- Azete
