= Azine (heterocycle) =

In Hantzsch–Widman nomenclature, an azine is an heterocyclic compound containing a 6-membered aromatic ring. It is an analog of a benzene ring in which one or more of the carbon atoms has been replaced by a nitrogen atom, and thus is also called an azabenzene. In both cases, the prefix aza- refers to the presence of one or more nitrogen atoms as replacement for carbon in a parent structure. The nitrogen has a lone pair of electrons instead of the hydrogen or substituent on the carbon—the overall replacement is isolobal.

== See also ==
- 6-membered rings with one nitrogen atom: pyridines
- 6-membered rings with two nitrogen atoms: diazines
- 6-membered rings with three nitrogen atoms: triazines
- 6-membered rings with four nitrogen atoms: tetrazines
- 6-membered rings with five nitrogen atoms: pentazines
- 6-membered ring with six nitrogen atoms: hexazine
