= C5H7NO =

The molecular formula C_{5}H_{7}NO (molar mass: 97.11 g/mol, exact mass: 97.0528 u) may refer to:

- Furfurylamine
- Oxazepine
