= Oxirene =

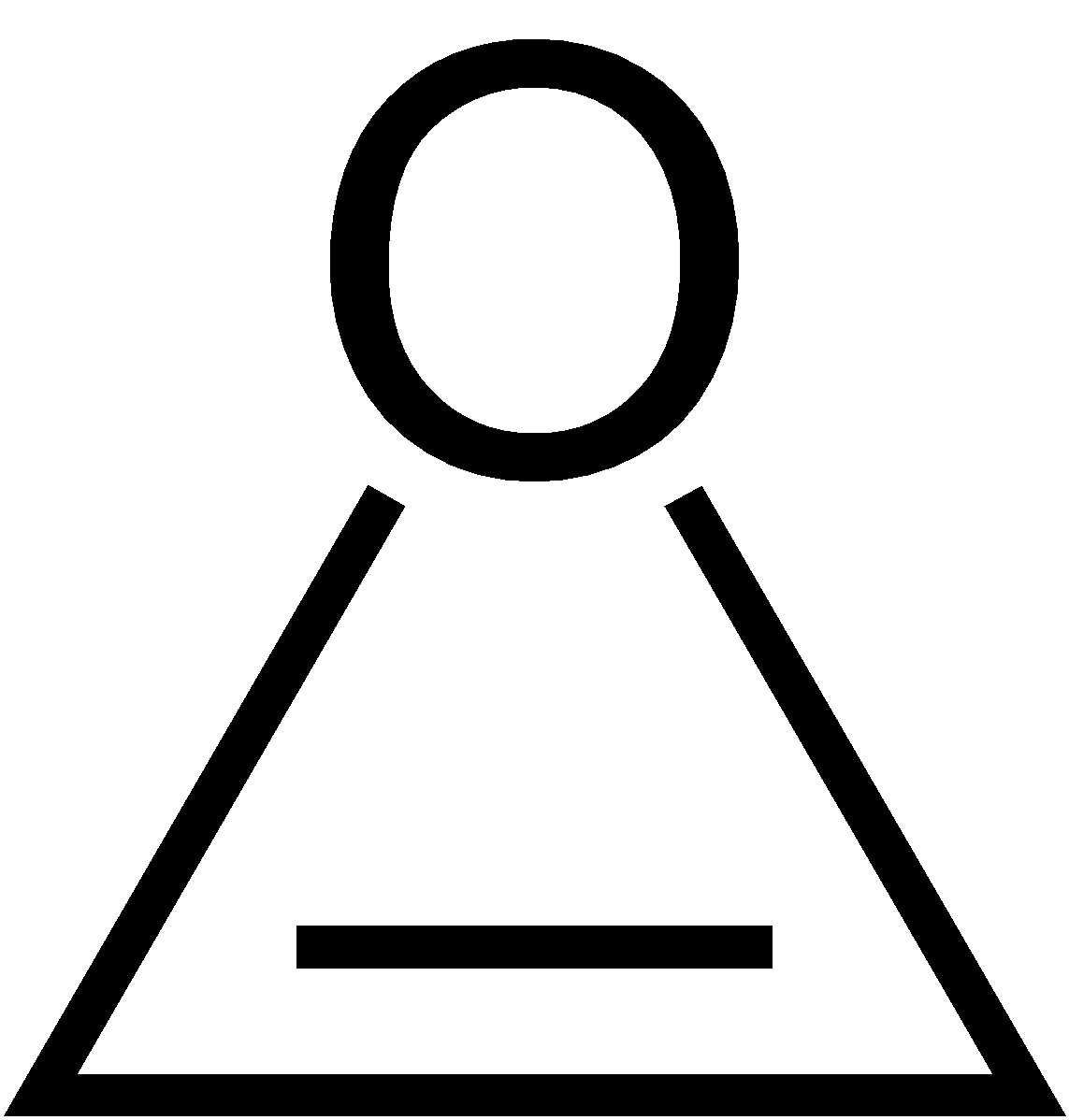

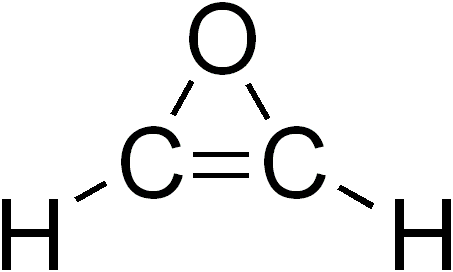

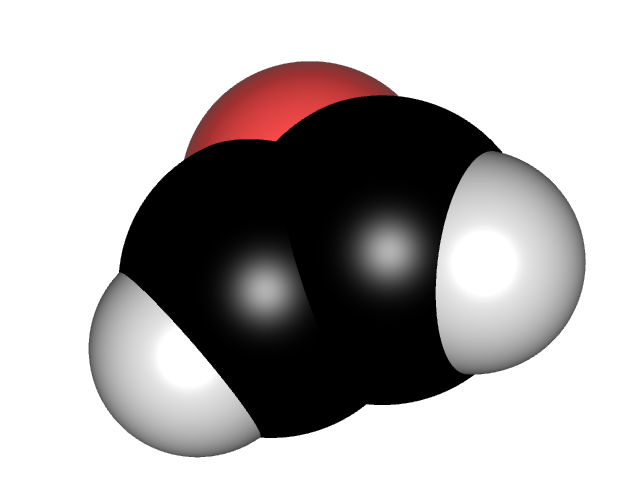

Names
- Preferred IUPAC name Oxirene
- Systematic IUPAC name Oxacyclopropene
- Other names Epoxyethene; Ethyne oxide Acetylene oxide

Identifiers
CAS Number	157-18-6
3D model (JSmol)	Interactive image
ChEBI	CHEBI:30973
ChemSpider	140985
MeSH	C012469
PubChem CID	160438
CompTox Dashboard (EPA)	DTXSID20166177
- InChI: InChI=1S/C2H2O/c1-2-3-1/h1-2H Key: BJEYNNFDAPPGST-UHFFFAOYSA-N; InChI=1/C2H2O/c1-2-3-1/h1-2H Key: BJEYNNFDAPPGST-UHFFFAOYAU
- SMILES: C1=CO1

Properties
Chemical formula	C_{2}H_{2}O
Molar mass	42.04 g/mol

Related compounds
Related molecules with 3-membered rings	Ethylene oxide cyclopropane cyclopropene aziridine thiirane thiirene
- Except where otherwise noted, data are given for materials in their standard state (at 25 °C [77 °F], 100 kPa). verify (what is ?) Infobox references

Oxirene is a heterocyclic chemical compound which contains an unsaturated three-membered ring containing two carbon atoms and one oxygen atom. The molecule was synthesized in low temperature ices and detected upon sublimation by isomer selective photoionization reflectron time-of-flight mass spectrometry.

Quantum chemical computational techniques found the configuration to be extremely strained and proposed an antiaromatic 4π electron system, as such oxirene is expected to be very high energy.

Experimental indications exist that substituted oxirenes (as intermediates or transition states) may be involved in carbonylcarbene rearrangements observed in the Wolff rearrangement. Computational evidence also point to the intermediacy of oxirenes in the ozonolysis of alkynes.
