= Dithiazole =

Class of chemical compounds

Dithiazole refers to heterocyclic compounds where the ring has the formula C_{2}NS_{2}. The parent compounds have the formula (CH)_{2}NHS_{2}. Cations with the same core are called dithiazolium compounds. Various isomers differ with respect to the location of the C, N, and S atoms.

- 1,2,3-Dithiazole has the sequence S-S-NH-CH-CH (all heteroatoms contiguous). Example:Lekin, Kristina; Phan, Hoa; Winter, Stephen M.; Wong, Joanne W. L.; Leitch, Alicea A.; Laniel, Dominique; Yong, Wenjun; Secco, Richard A.; Tse, John S.; Desgreniers, Serge; Dube, Paul A.; Shatruk, Michael; Oakley, Richard T. (2014). "Heat, Pressure and Light-Induced Interconversion of Bisdithiazolyl Radicals and Dimers". Journal of the American Chemical Society. 136 (22): 8050–8062. doi:10.1021/ja502753t. PMID 24851953.
- 1,2,4-Dithiazole has the sequence S-S-CH-NH-CH
- 1,3,2-Dithiazole has the sequence S-NH-S-CH-CH (all heteroatoms contiguous)
- 1,4,2-Dithiazole has the sequence S-NH-CH-S-CH
