= C4H5NS =

The molecular formula C_{4}H_{5}NS (molar mass: 99.15 g/mol, exact mass: 99.0143 u) may refer to:

- Allyl isothiocyanate (AITC)
- Thiazine
