= C3H6S =

The molecular formula C_{3}H_{6}S (molar mass: 74.14 g/mol, exact mass: 74.0190 u) may refer to:

- Allylstopper (AM)
- Thietane
- Thioacetone
