= C3H4O =

C_{3}H_{4}O is a chemical formula that represents each of several actual and hypothetical compounds that differ in structure, but each consist of three atoms of carbon, four of hydrogen, and one of oxygen. The following compounds are among them:

Name	CAS #	Notes	Structure
Oxetene, 2H-Oxete	287-25-2	Synthesized; unstable. Can be made by using light to cyclize acrolein.	
2-Oxabicyclo[1.1.0]butane	35553-05-0		
Acrolein, 2-propenal	107-02-8	Forms from pollutants, burning, metabolism. Cis and trans forms; cis form predominant.	
Propa-1,2-dien-1-ol	81788-96-7	Synthesized. Tautomerizes "quantitatively" to acrolein above −50 °C.	
Propargyl alcohol or 2-propyn-1-ol	107-19-7	"Mild, geranium odor" Used in synthesis, as corrosion inhibitor, soil fumigant.	
Methoxy ethyne, methoxyacetylene	6443-91-0		
Prop-1-yn-1-ol, 1-propynol	6175-54-8		
Methylketene or 1-propen-1-one	6004-44-0	Synthesized. Intermediate in acrolein pyrolysis. Of astronomical interest.	
Methylene oxirane, allene oxide	40079-14-9	Synthesized; predicted (1968) to isomerize "readily" to cyclopropanone.	
Cyclopropanone	5009-27-8	Synthesized; unstable due to polymerization and ring-opening. Derivatives used in synthesis, biology. Tautomer of 1-cyclopen-1-ol	
Cycloprop-1-en-1-ol, cyclopropene alcohol	81788-95-6	Tautomer of cyclopropanone; Not synthesized	
2-Cyclopropenol or 1-hydroxy-2-cyclopropene	81788-94-5	Not synthesized	
1,2-Epoxypropene or 2-methyloxirene	2835-41-8	Synthesized; unstable. Product of ionized diazoacetone; isomerizes "rapidly" to methylketene, acrolein, methoxyethyne, and/or 1-propynol.	
