= Basic Black =

Basic Black may refer to:

- Basic Black (TV series), American weekly television series airing on WGBH in Boston
- Basic Black (radio program), Canadian radio program on CBC Radio
- Basic Black: Tales of Appropriate Fear, collection of horror stories by Terry Dowling

== See also ==
- Basic Black 2, a soluble dye
