= Silacyclobutane =

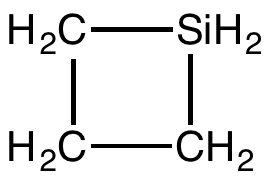

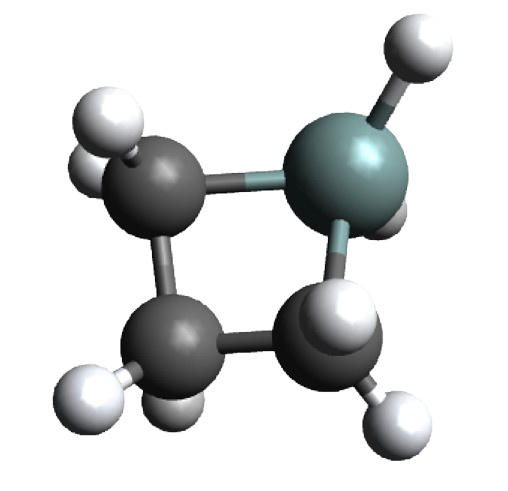

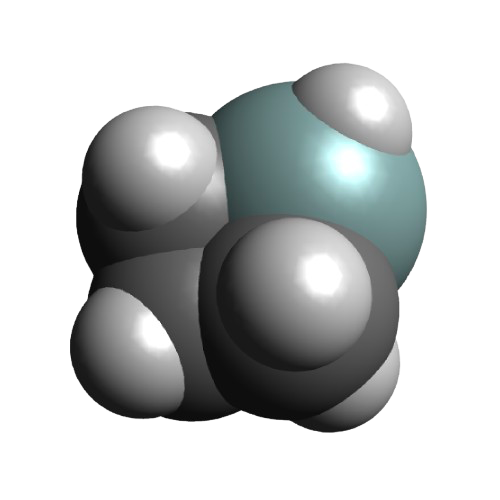

Names
- Preferred IUPAC name Siletane

Identifiers
CAS Number	287-29-6
3D model (JSmol)	Interactive image
ChemSpider	60837
PubChem CID	67514
CompTox Dashboard (EPA)	DTXSID60883356
- InChI: InChI=1S/C3H8Si/c1-2-4-3-1/h1-4H2 Key: QZYLHXTXFGOILC-UHFFFAOYSA-N
- SMILES: C1C[SiH2]C1

Properties
Chemical formula	C_{3}H_{8}Si
Molar mass	72.182 g·mol^{−1}
Appearance	clear, colorless liquid
Boiling point	29.8 °C (85.6 °F; 302.9 K)
Vapor pressure	641 mmHg

Related compounds
Related compounds	Silete; Silolane; Silole; Silabenzene; Phosphetane; Thietane
- Except where otherwise noted, data are given for materials in their standard state (at 25 °C [77 °F], 100 kPa). Infobox references

Silacyclobutane (SCB) or siletane is a four-membered heterocylic ring (silacycle) consisting of one silicon atom and three carbon atoms with the general formula (CH_{2})_{3}SiH_{2}. Silacyclobutane is one of the simplest molecules in the family of organosilicon compounds. The four-membered ring framework of silacyclobutane is analogous to that of cyclobutane, but one carbon atom is replaced by silicon. The four atoms of silacyclobutane form a nonplanar, puckered ring. Derivatives of silacyclobutane are called silacyclobutanes with the general formula (CH_{2})_{3}SiR_{2}, though substituion at the carbon atom is common. Since the first synthetic report of silacyclobutane in the 1950s, silacyclobutane and its analogues have garnered considerable attention owing to their high ring strain, Lewis acidity, and tunable silicon-carbon bond activation, which enable diverse ring-opening and ring-expansion pathways. Other notable applications include using silacyclobutanes as reagents to achieve enantioselective intermolecular C–H silylation and to synthesize Si-stereogenic vinylsilanes.

== Structure ==
The four carbon atoms in cyclobutane are not coplanar but rather adopt a "puckered" or "butterfly" conformation resulting from the large barrier to internal rotation due to the repulsions of the three adjacent methylene groups. The dihedral angle of the silacyclobutane puckered ring has been calculated as 35.9 ± 2°. For silacyclobutane, the C-Si-C and C-C-C bond angles have been calculated as 77.2-78.8° and 97.0-100.5°, respectively utilizing multi-configurational self-consistent field (MCSCF) and gas electron diffraction.

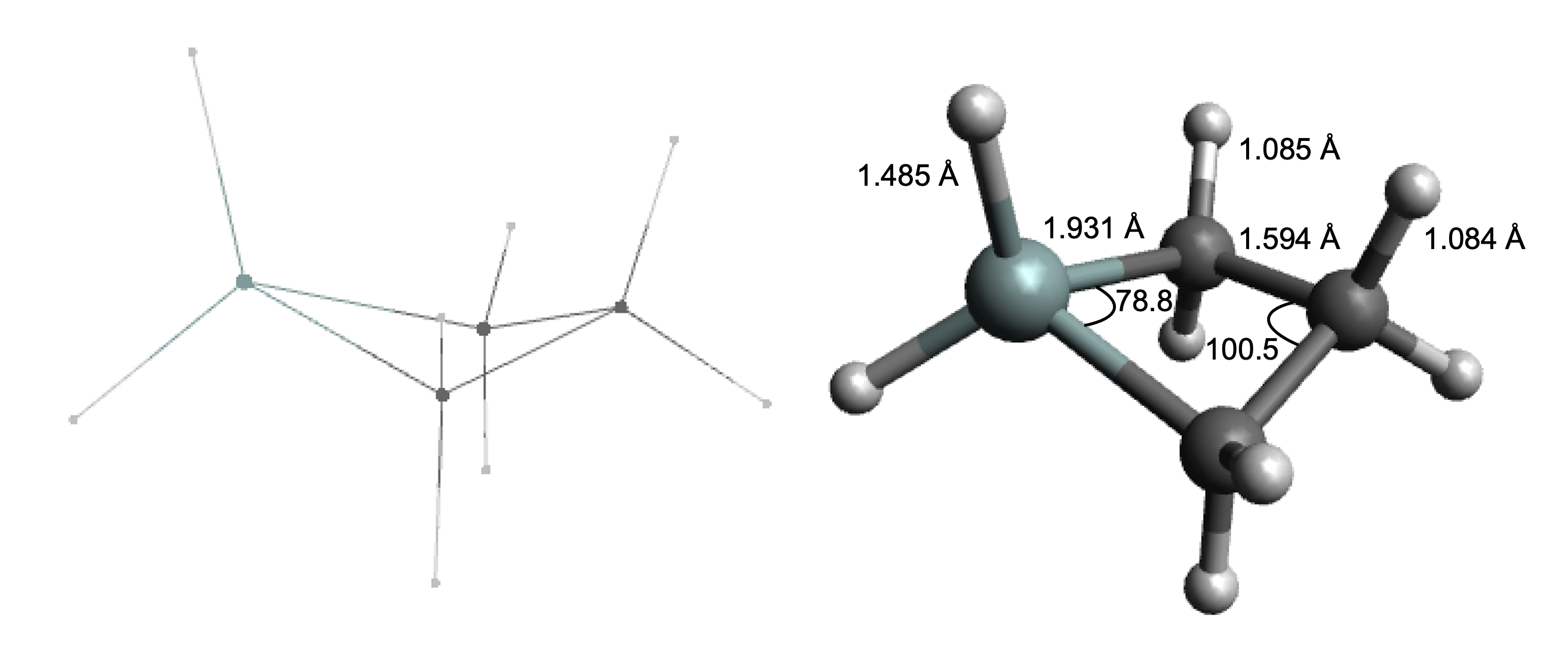
Puckered/butterfly structure of silacyclobutane.

Like cyclobutane, the small heterocyclic ring of silacyclobutane is highly strained, resulting in lower bond energies when compared to related linear or unstrained, silicon-containing or hydrocarbon rings, such as hexane, cyclohexane, or silacyclohexane. Interestingly, the energetic barrier to puckering of silacyclobutane (440 cm^{−1}) is lower than that of cyclobutane (498 cm^{−1}), perhaps owing to the greater flexibility of C-Si-C, longer Si–C bonds, and greater bond angle flexibility. Electronic structure calculations of silacyclobutane reveal that the LUMO is lower in energy compared to cyclobutane.

The highly strained nature of silacyclobutanes can be investigated through thermolysis, which can provide insights into ring stability and decomposition. Interestingly, there is a considerable difference in liquid- vs. gas-phase thermal decomposition for these compounds. The liquid-phase pyrolysis of 1,1-dimethyl-1-silacyclobutane with the formula (CH_{2})_{3}SiMe_{2} results in ring-opening polymerization at 150-200 °C. In comparison, gas-phase pyrolysis of has been demonstrated to primarily undergo unimolecular decomposition to ethene and dimethylsilene at 400-460 °C. It was later shown that there are two minor decomposition pathways: one that forms methyl radicals via the Si–CH_{3} bond cleavage and another propene–dimethylsilylene species.

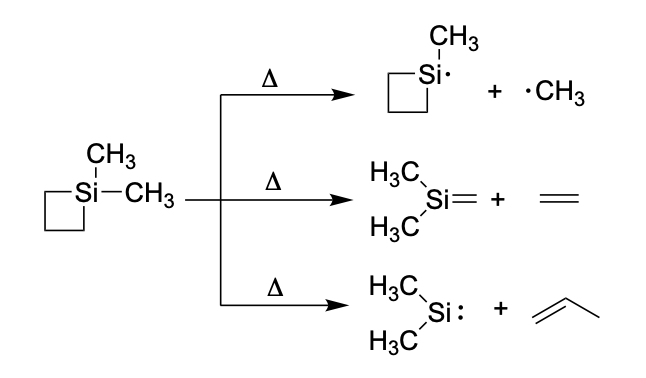
Gas-phase thermolysis products of 1,1-dimethyl-1-silacyclobutane.

== Synthesis and history ==
Fredrick Stanley Kipping, a pioneer of silicon chemistry in the 1920s was the first to conceptualize silacyclobutane in his series of manuscripts titled "Organic Derivatives of Silicon" and is often credited in its history. However, products formed Kipping's experiments were complex mixtures and he could not conclusively isolate or characterize the silacycles. Kipping's work was one of the earliest demonstrations that silicon could form stable cyclic structures analogous to carbon rings, giving rise to modern organosilicon chemistry.

=== Grignard reagent addition ===
In 1954, Sommer and Baum reported the first successful synthesis and isolation of a silacyclobutane, 1,1-dimethyl-1-silacyclobutane. Starting from (3-bromopropyl)trimethylsilane, they formed a disiloxane intermediate and subsequently generated a terminal dihalide that was treated with magnesium metal and dilute diethyl ether to form the respective in situ Grignard reagents (see also Barbier reaction), which perform Wurtz-type coupling intramolecular ring closure by preferentially attacking the bromine site first, followed by the chloride site to form a four-membered ring.

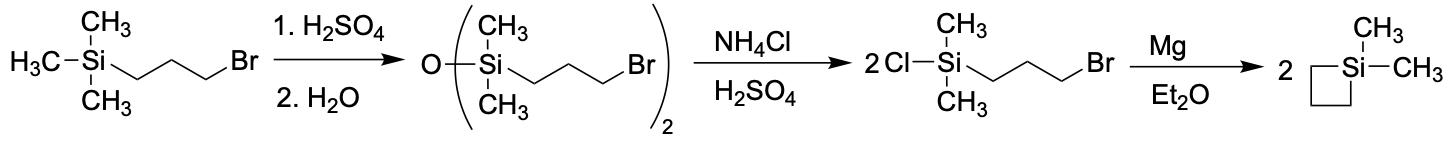
Formation of 1,1-dimethyl-1-silacyclobutane from (3-bromopropyl)trimethylsilane treated with acid to form a disiloxane, followed by chlorination to form a dihalide, and Wurtz-type coupling ring closure utilizing Grignard reagents.

Classically, silacyclobutanes can be formed using Grignard addition. Notably, this method is employed in the formation of benzosilacyclobutanes from a 1-bromo-2-(bromomethyl)benzene starting material by Gilman and Atwell in the 1960s, followed by de Boer et al. and Kang et al. in the 1980s.

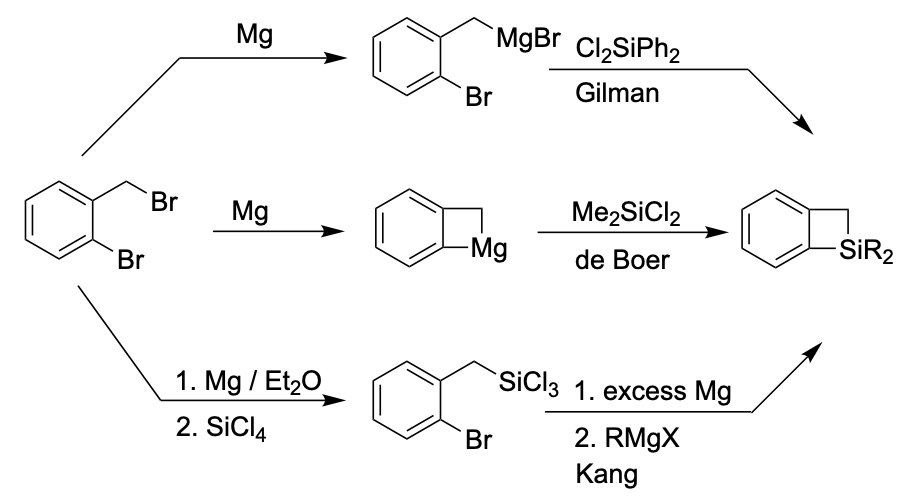
Synthesis of benzosilacyclobutanes from 1-bromo-2-(bromomethyl)benzene using Grignard addition reactions.

=== Halogenated silacyclobutanes and nucleophilic substitution ===
Vdovin et al. and Laane et al. in the 1960's synthesized the first halogenated silacyclobutanes, 1,1-dichloro-silacyclobutane and 1,1-difloro-silacyclobutane. The former SiCl_{2}-containing silacyclobutane can be prepared from either (3-bromopropyl)trichlorosilane, which forms more readily, or (3-chloropropyl)trichlorosilane reagents in similar yield. The Si-Cl bond lability stems two-fold from the electrophilicity of Si and the weak base chloride ion having propensity to be good a leaving group. Thus, 1,1-dichloro-silacyclobutane proves to be a useful intermediate for accessing further structurally modified silacyclobutanes through nucleophilic substitution. Indeed, as proof of concept, Laane synthesized silacyclobutane-1,1-d_{2} species using LiAlD_{4}, a deuterated, strong reducing agent isotopologue to LiAlH_{4}. In 1980, Auner and Grobe further expanded the collection of known silacyclobutanes through substitution of the SiCl_{2}-containing silacyclobutane using dimethylamine, Grignard reagents, and sodium cyclopentadienide.

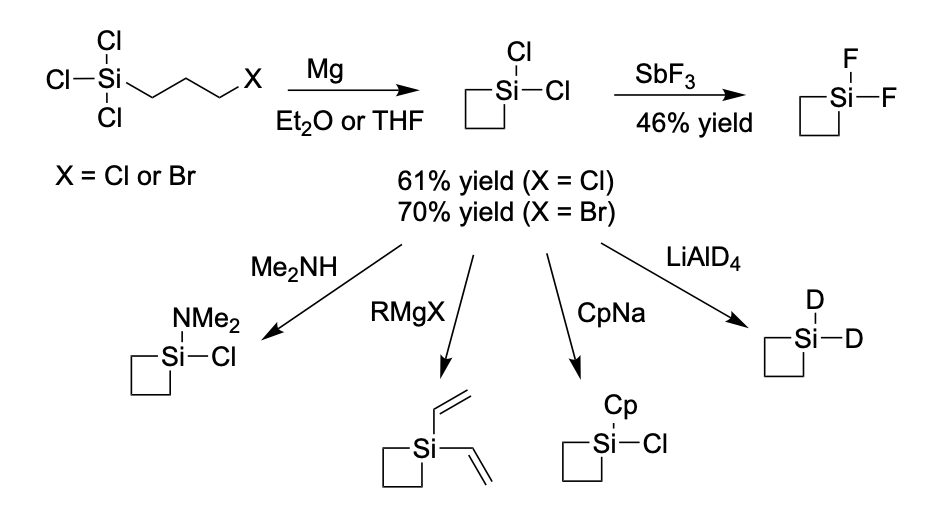
Nucleophilic substitution of SiCl_{2}-containing silacyclobutane using dimethylamine, Grignard reagents, sodium cyclopentadienide, and LiAlD_{4}.

=== [2+2] cycloaddition with alkenes ===
Alternatively, silacyclobutanes can be prepared through [2+2] cycloaddition reaction with alkenes. Jones et al. demonstrate this using in situ formed vinyldimethylchlorosilane, t-BuLi, and 1,3-butadiene to form a mixture of disilacyclobutanes, monosilacyclobutanes, and silicon-containing products (1). When 1,3-butadiene is utilized as a trapping reagent, the reaction is high yielding and E/Z stereochemical products are formed in moderate ratio (2).

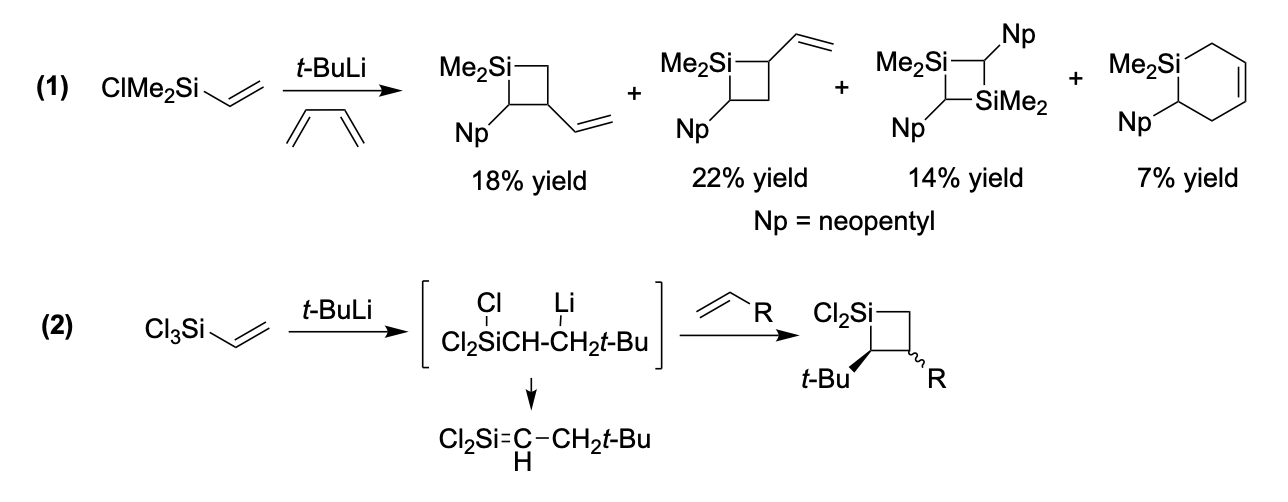
[2+2] cycloaddition with alkenes to form silacyclobutanes as a mixture of disilacyclobutanes, monosilacyclobutanes, and silicon-containing products (1) or the E/Z stereochemical products (2).

== Reactivity ==
=== Strain-release Lewis acids ===
Proposed by Denmark and Sweis in 2002, the term “strain-release Lewis acid” describes the enhanced Lewis acidity of silacyclobutanes that arises from the reduction of ring strain in small ring systems upon coordination by a Lewis base. This phenomenon has also been observed in many other highly-strained compounds, such as small bicyclic carbocycles. In silacyclobutane, the 4-membered ring angle is compressed (79° vs 109° in a typical tetrahedron), which poses significant strain on the molecule. Coordination of a fifth ligand lowers the ring strain due to rehybridization of geometry to a distorted trigonal bipyramid with a silicon center (79° vs 90° in a typical trigonal bipyramidal). This pathway is thermodynamically favored, increasing the tendency of silacyclobutanes to undergo activation by a nucleophile.

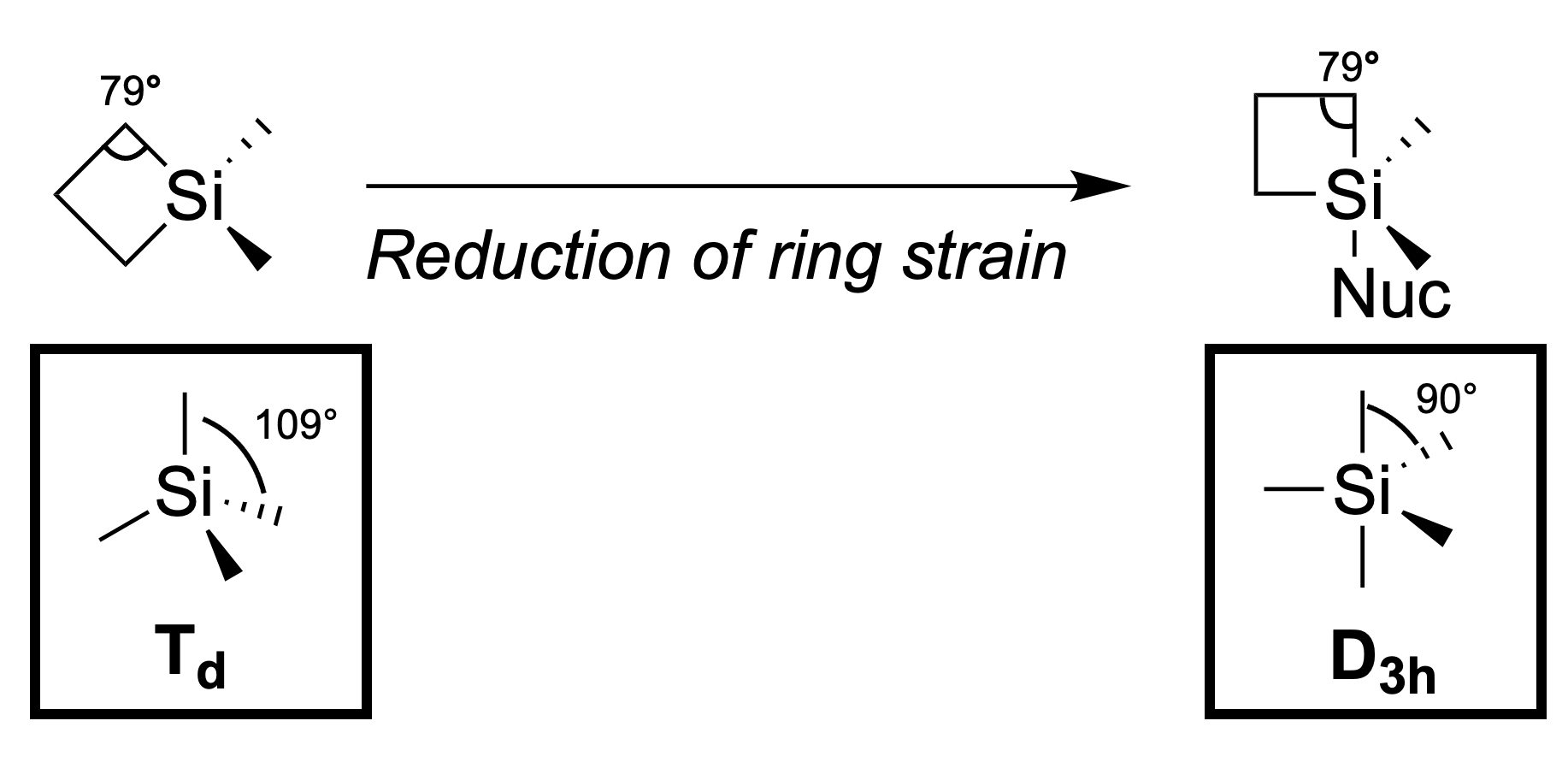
Silacylobutane as a "strain-release lewis acid" resulting from favorable coordination of a fifth ligand reducing the ring strain through the formation of a distorted trigonal bipyramidal silicon (79° vs 90° typical trigonal bipyramid).

=== Pd-catalyzed cross-coupling / Hiyama Coupling ===
Indeed, the enhanced Lewis acidity of silacyclobutanes has been readily exploited in the cross-coupling reaction of alkenyl silacyclobutanes with alkenyl and aryl halides using an activator, such as TBAF, and palladium catalyst to form the cross-coupling products at room temperature in high yield while retaining olefin geometry of the partners (1). Vinyl and propenyl silacyclobutanes can also be useful cross-coupling partners at moderate conditions (2). Further, aryl silacylobutanes can be used as a cross-coupling reagent to form biaryls, although the reaction typically must be refluxed and tri-tert-butyl added to suppress competing homo-coupling (3). This Pd-catalyzed cross-coupling between silanes and halides is better known as Hiyama coupling.

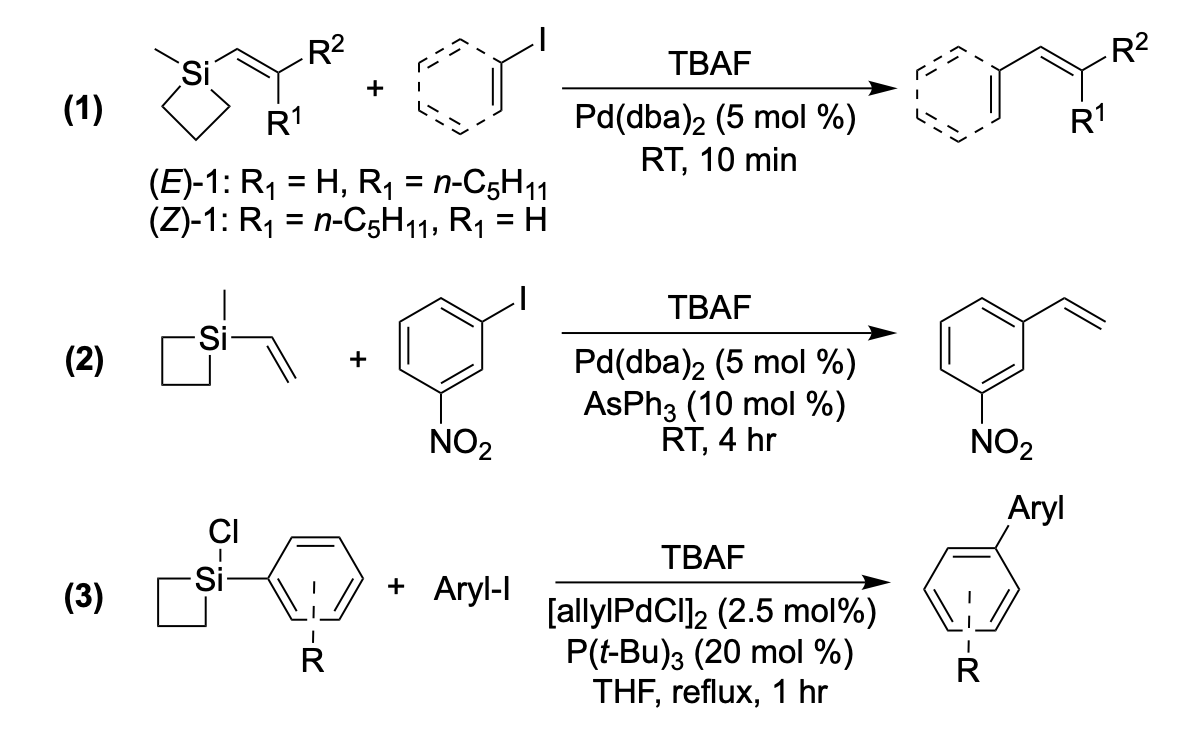
Cross-coupling reaction of alkenyl (1), vinyl/propenyl (2), and aryl silacyclobutanes (3) with alkenyl and aryl halides using an activator and palladium catalyst.

=== Transition-Metal-Catalyzed Ring Opening ===
The strain-release Lewis acidity of silacyclobutanes can be harnessed in tandem with transition-metal-catalysts to facilitate Si-C bond cleavage and ring-opening. These types of reactions have been leveraged to trigger anionic polymerization in many reported syntheses of functional polymers. Qui-Chao et al. go as far to say silacyclobutanes are, "not only building blocks in organic synthesis but also an emerging class of monomers in polymer chemistry."

The ring-opened silacyclobutane‐derived organosilanes serve as excellent substrates for Fleming–Tamao oxidation due to their stability and reactivity, enabling efficient conversion to the corresponding alcohols.

==== Palladium and platinum-catalyzed ring opening ====
In general, palladium and platinum complexes are known to efficiently promote catalytic ring opening of silacyclobutanes. Weyenberg and Nelson extensively demonstrated this in 1964, utilizing platinum metal as a catalyst to hydrosilate a series of silacyclobutanes (1) and showed that the reaction involved exchange of Si-H of the hydrosilane and Si-C of silacyclobutane. They hypothesized that silacyclobutanes might undergo oxidative-addition with platinum to form 1-platina-2-silacyclobutane. A notable palladium-catalyzed ring opening reaction was reported by Tanaka et al. using acid chloride in the presence of triethylamine in mild contains to produce 1-phenyl-4-(chlorodimethylsilyl)-1-butanone in high yield (2). Further, these same researchers observed and deciphered the mechanism behind regioselective ring-opening products being obtained in good yield from silacyclobutanes and aryl iodides with a Pd(PPh_{3})_{4} catalyst (3).

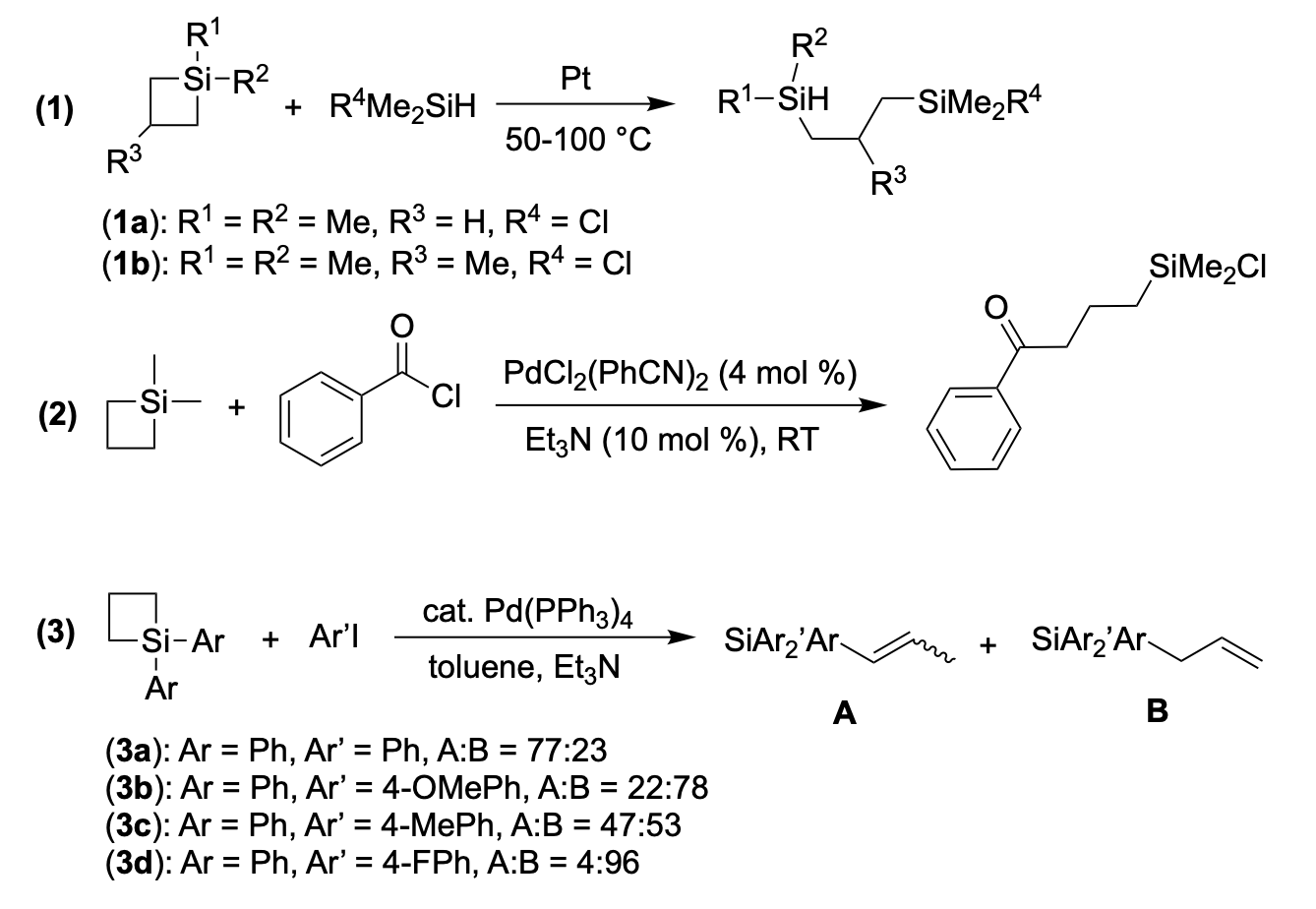
Platinum and palladium-catalyzed ring opening reactions with silacyclobutanes.

==== Nickel-catalyzed ring opening ====
In effort to utilize more abundant and affordable catalysts for ring-opening, Oshima et al. demonstrated the viability of nickel-catalyzed ring-opening of silacyclobutanes with aldehydes (1) and terminal alkenes (2), retaining stereoselectivity and regioselectivity.

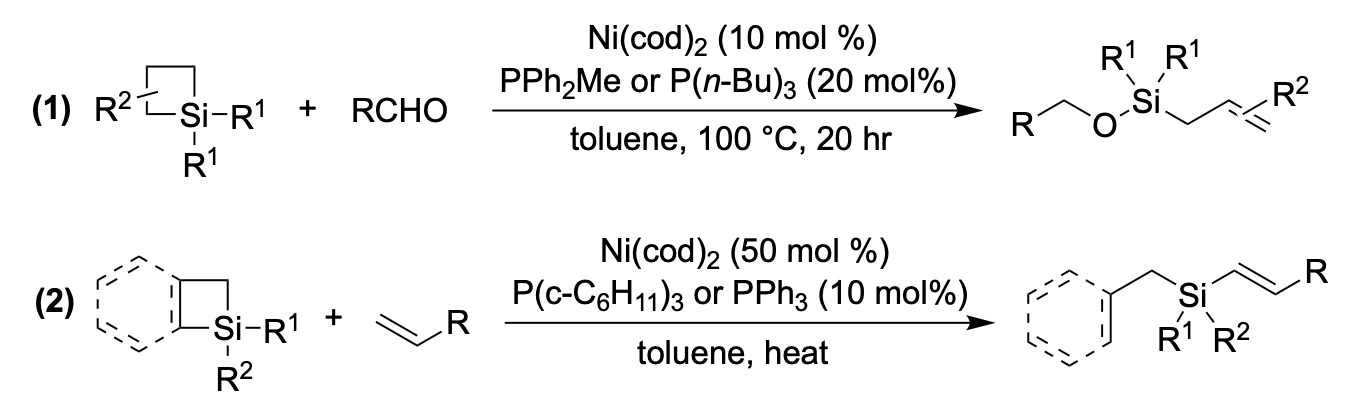
Nickel-catalyzed ring-opening of silacyclobutanes with aldehydes (1) and terminal alkenes (2).

=== Transition-metal-catalyzed ring expansion ===
Ring expansion as a means to form a diverse array of sila-heterocycles, along with elucidating the underlying mechanisms governing this phenomenon, remains an active area of research. In particular, ring expansion using silacyclobutanes has been useful in synthesizing cyclic silyl enol ethers which are useful precursors in organosilicon chemistry.

Ring expansion has been shown to commence in a multitude of ways, such as insertion with SO_{2}, SO_{3}, phosphorus ylides, acid chloride, palladium catalysts, platinum catalysts, nickel catalysts, rhodium catalysts, along with others. Notable reactions include palladium-catalyzed ring expansion cycloaddition of silacyclobutane with alkynes (1) and nickel-catalyzed ring expansion of silacyclobutanes with aldehydes to form cyclic enol ethers (2). Further work has also showed that ring expansion of silacyclobutanes to five, six, seven, and eight-membered heterocycles can be achieved.

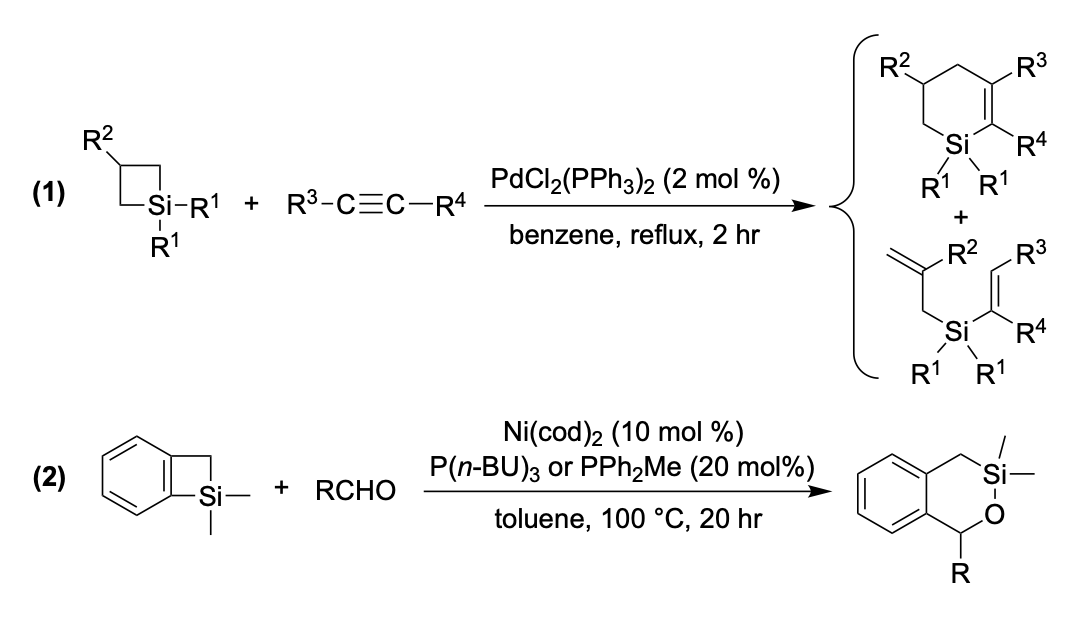
Palladium-catalyzed ring expansion cycloaddition of silacyclobutane with alkynes (1) and nickel-catalyzed ring expansion of silacyclobutanes with aldehydes to form cyclic enol ethers (2).

=== Metal-free reactions ===
==== Carboxylation by CO_{2} ====
In comparison to the numerous transition-metal catalyzed reactions noted above, metal-free ring opening or expansion reactions remain relatively rare. Most notably, in 2018 Murakami et al. observed a carboxylation, ring expansion, and subsequent ring opening of silacyclobutane in the presence of only CO_{2} and no other additional activating agents.

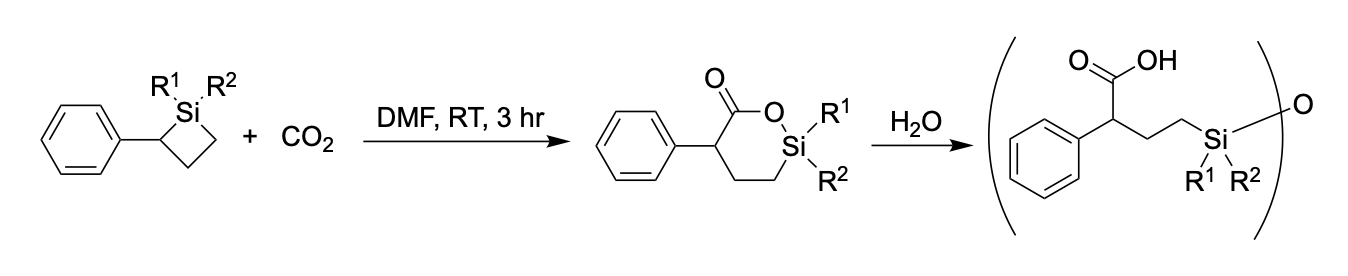
Carboxylation, ring expansion, and subsequent ring opening of silacyclobutane in the presence of only CO_{2} and no other additional activating agents.

==== Heat-directed ring opening ====
In some cases, ring opening of silacyclobutanes has also been observed under heat, such as that seen by O'Neil et al. who reported a chemoselective carbonyl allylation between alkoxyallylsilacyclobutanes and salicylaldehydes. DFT calculations support that the electron-rich oxygen atom stabilizes the transition state during the process.

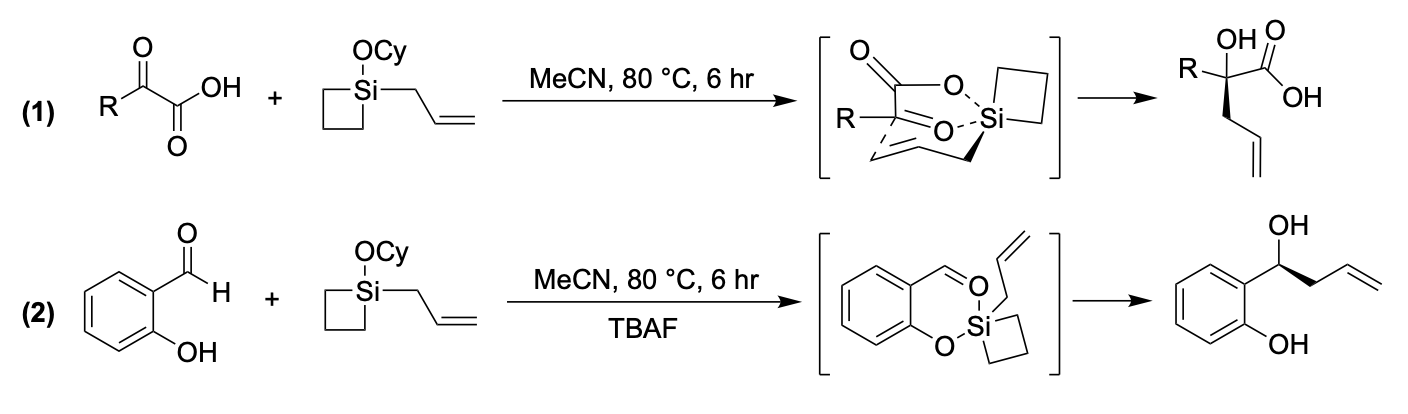
Chemoselective carbonyl allylation between alkoxyallylsilacyclobutane and salicylaldehydes where the electron-rich oxygen atom stabilizes the transition state.

==== Aldol addition ====
Due to their enhanced Lewis acidity, silacyclobutanes have been shown to react with aldehydes to form non catalyzed aldol addition products at accelerated rates relative to silyl enol derivatives of ketones or esters with aldehydes which proceed extraordinarily slow even at high temperatures. These reactions may be further accelerated from the addition of potassium tert-butoxide.

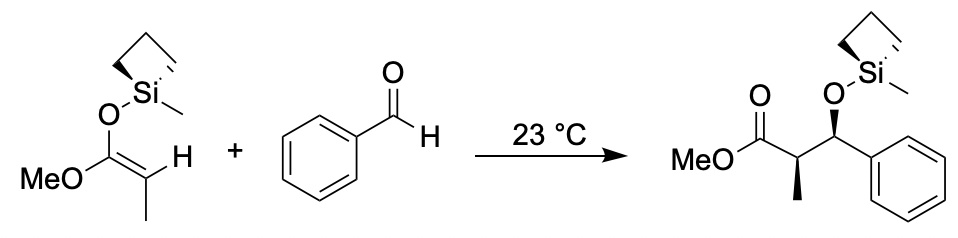
Reaction of silacyclobutanes with aldehydes to form non catalyzed aldol addition products.

==== Allyation reaction ====
Work by Meyers et al. showed that silacyclobutanes have stronger Lewis acidity than tetraalkylsilacyclobutanes and could activate a carbonyl compound in an allylation reaction without catalyst to yield a homoallylic alcohol product with high regio- and stereoselectivity.

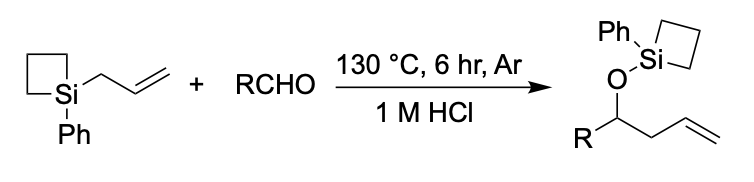
Allylation reaction with silacyclobutae to yield a homoallylic alcohol product.
