= Thietane =

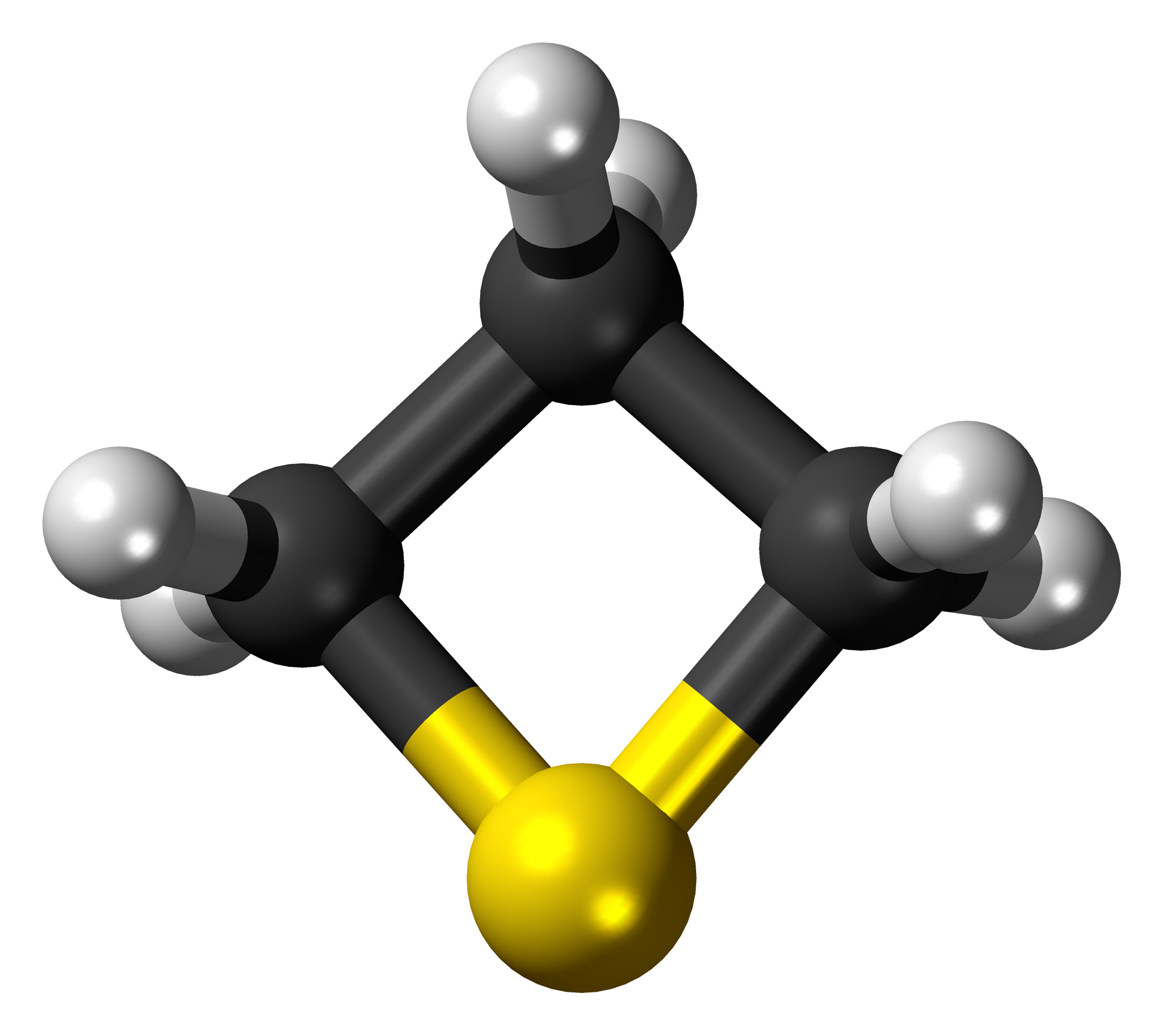

Names
- Preferred IUPAC name Thietane
- Systematic IUPAC name Thiacyclobutane
- Other names Trimethylene sulfide

Identifiers
CAS Number	287-27-4
3D model (JSmol)	Interactive image
Beilstein Reference	102383
ChEBI	CHEBI:87565
ChemSpider	8895
ECHA InfoCard	100.005.469
EC Number	206-015-0
PubChem CID	9251
UNII	1O7C19QQDB
UN number	1993
CompTox Dashboard (EPA)	DTXSID7059773
- InChI: InChI=1S/C3H6S/c1-2-4-3-1/h1-3H2 Key: XSROQCDVUIHRSI-UHFFFAOYSA-N
- SMILES: C1CSC1

Properties
Chemical formula	C_{3}H_{6}S
Molar mass	74.14 g·mol^{−1}
Appearance	Colourless liquid
Odor	Sulfurous
Density	1.028 g cm^{−3}
Boiling point	94 to 95 °C (201 to 203 °F; 367 to 368 K)

Hazards
- GHS labelling
Pictograms	(GHS02: Flammable) (GHS07: Exclamation mark)
Signal word	Danger
Hazard statements	H225, H302
Precautionary statements	P210
NFPA 704 (fire diamond)	2 4 1
Flash point	−11(9) °C

Related compounds
Other anions	Oxetane, Azetidine, Phosphetane
Related compounds	Thiirane, Dithietane, Tetrahydrothiophene, Thiane, Thiepane, Thiocane, Thionane
- Except where otherwise noted, data are given for materials in their standard state (at 25 °C [77 °F], 100 kPa). verify (what is ?) Infobox references

Thietane is a heterocyclic compound containing a saturated four-membered ring with three carbon atoms and one sulfur atom. Some derivatives are of interest as drugs.

Thietane, and its derivative 2-propylthietane, are strong-smelling mouse alarm pheromones and predator scent analogues. Both the mouse and human olfactory receptors MOR244-3 and OR2T11, respectively, were found to respond to thietane in the presence of copper.

== Synthesis ==
Thietanes are the subject of many preparative studies. They are traditionally produced in modest or poor yields from 1,3-difunctionalized alkanes. One example is the reaction of trimethylene carbonate and potassium thiocyanate.

C_{4}H_{6}O_{3} + KSCN → C_{3}H_{6}S + KOCN + CO_{2}

An improved synthesis method is the reaction of 1,3-dibromopropane and sodium sulfide.

Br−(CH_{2})_{3}−Br + Na_{2}S → C_{3}H_{6}S + 2 NaBr

Alternatively, phosphines desulfurize 1,2-dithiolanes to thietanes.

== Reactions ==
Nucleophiles like butyllithium can open the ring in thietane. Thietane also reacts with bromine.

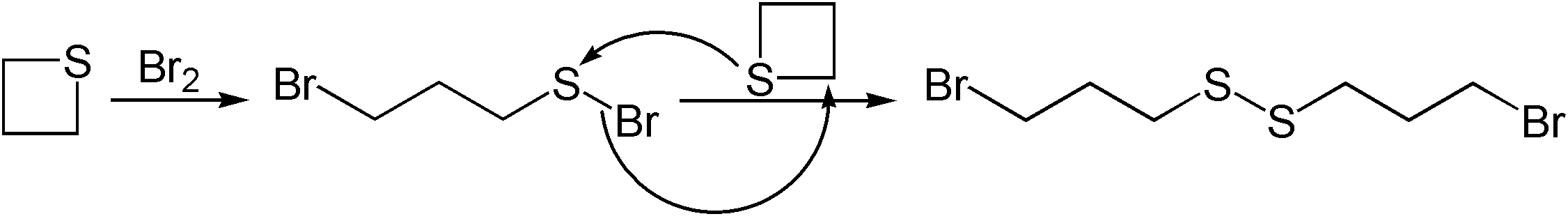
