= Pyran =

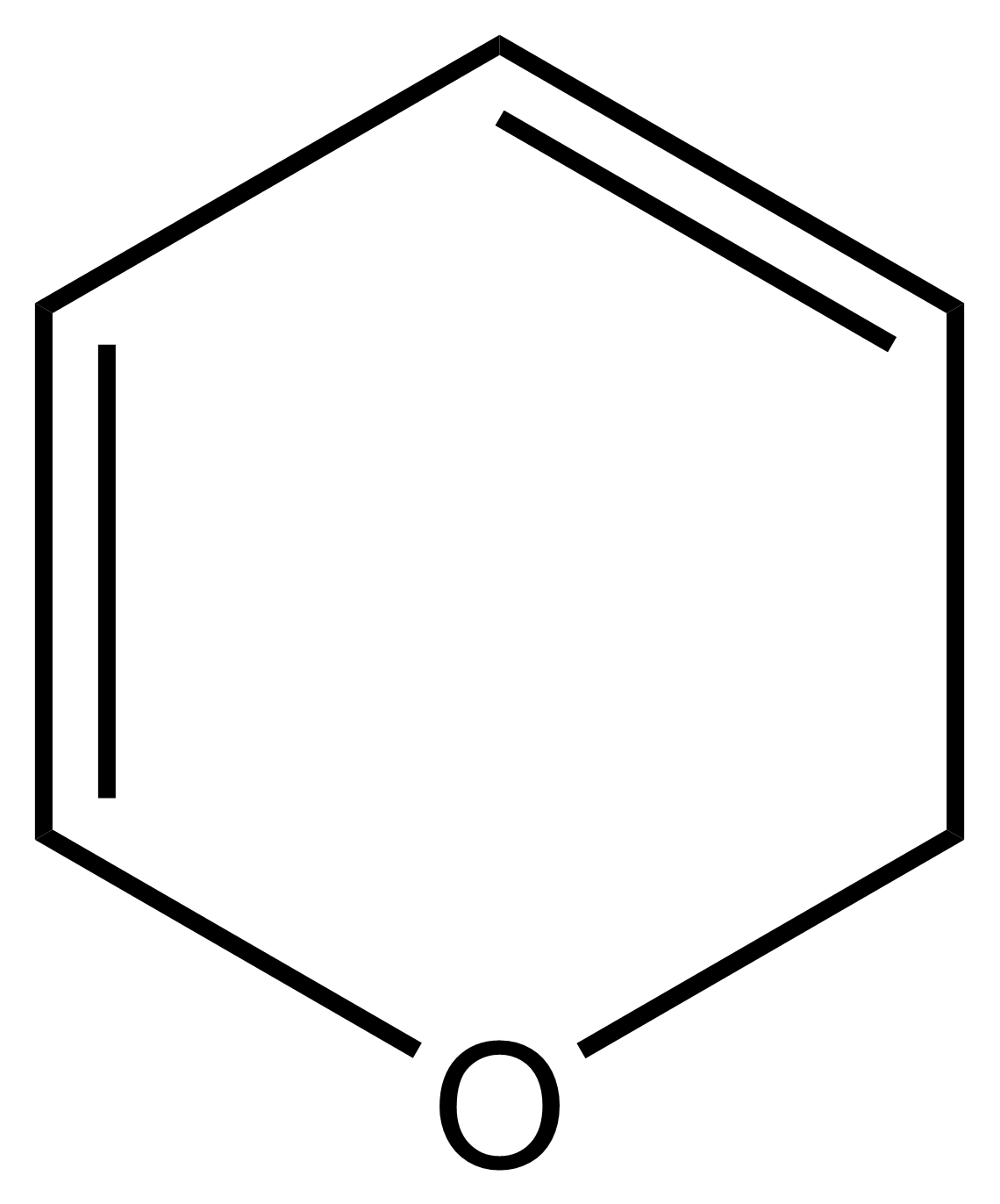
2H-pyran
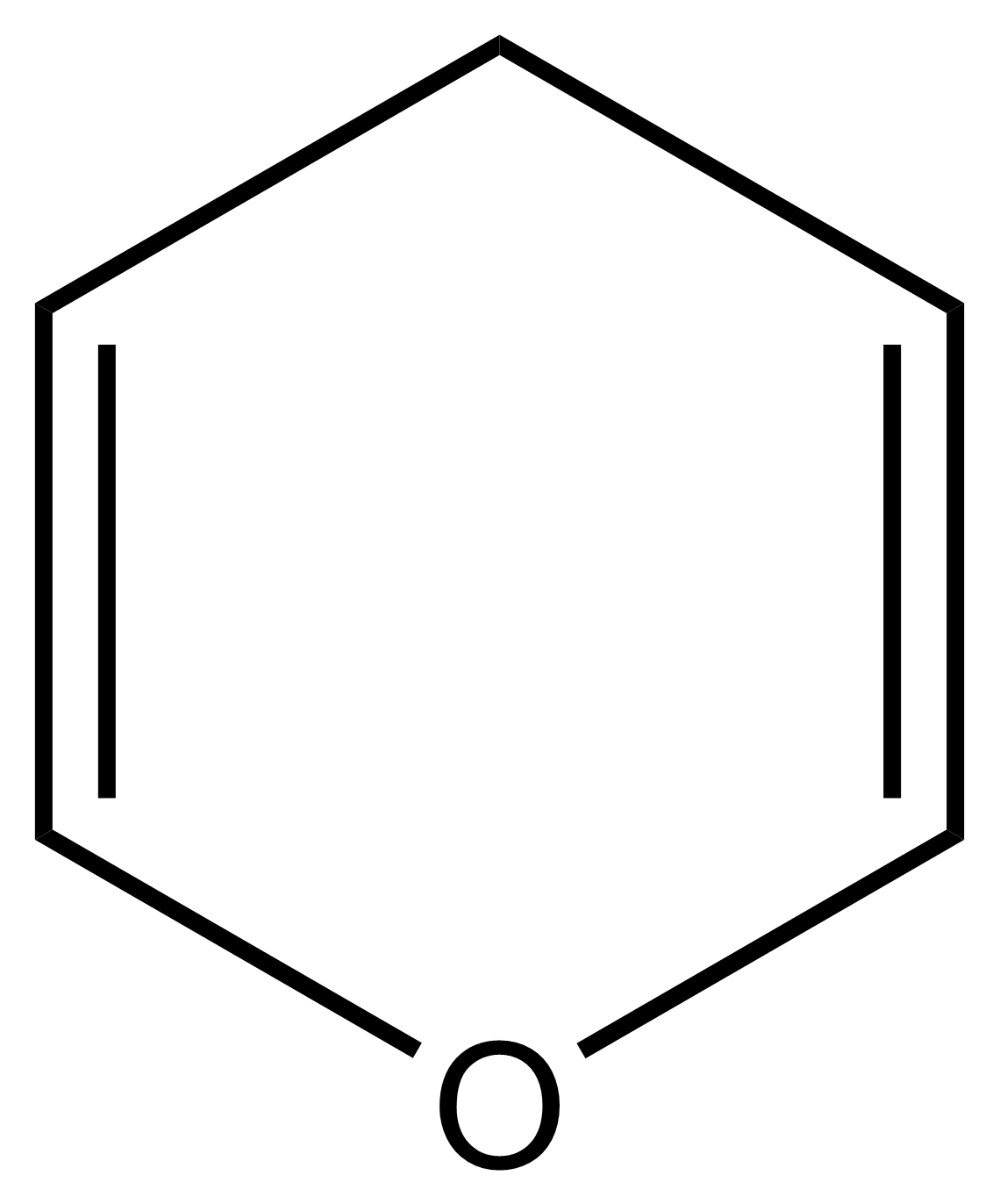
4H-pyran
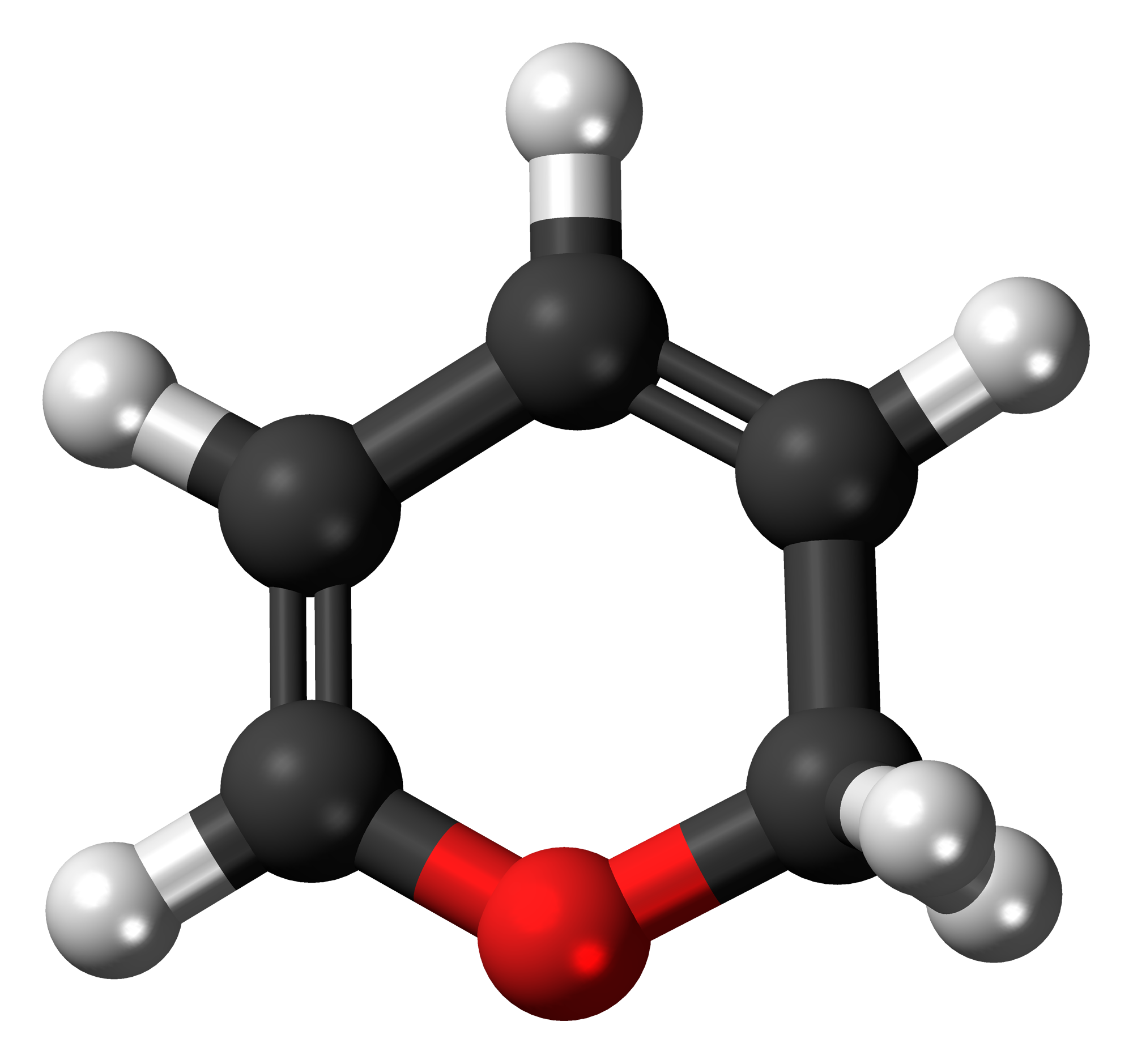

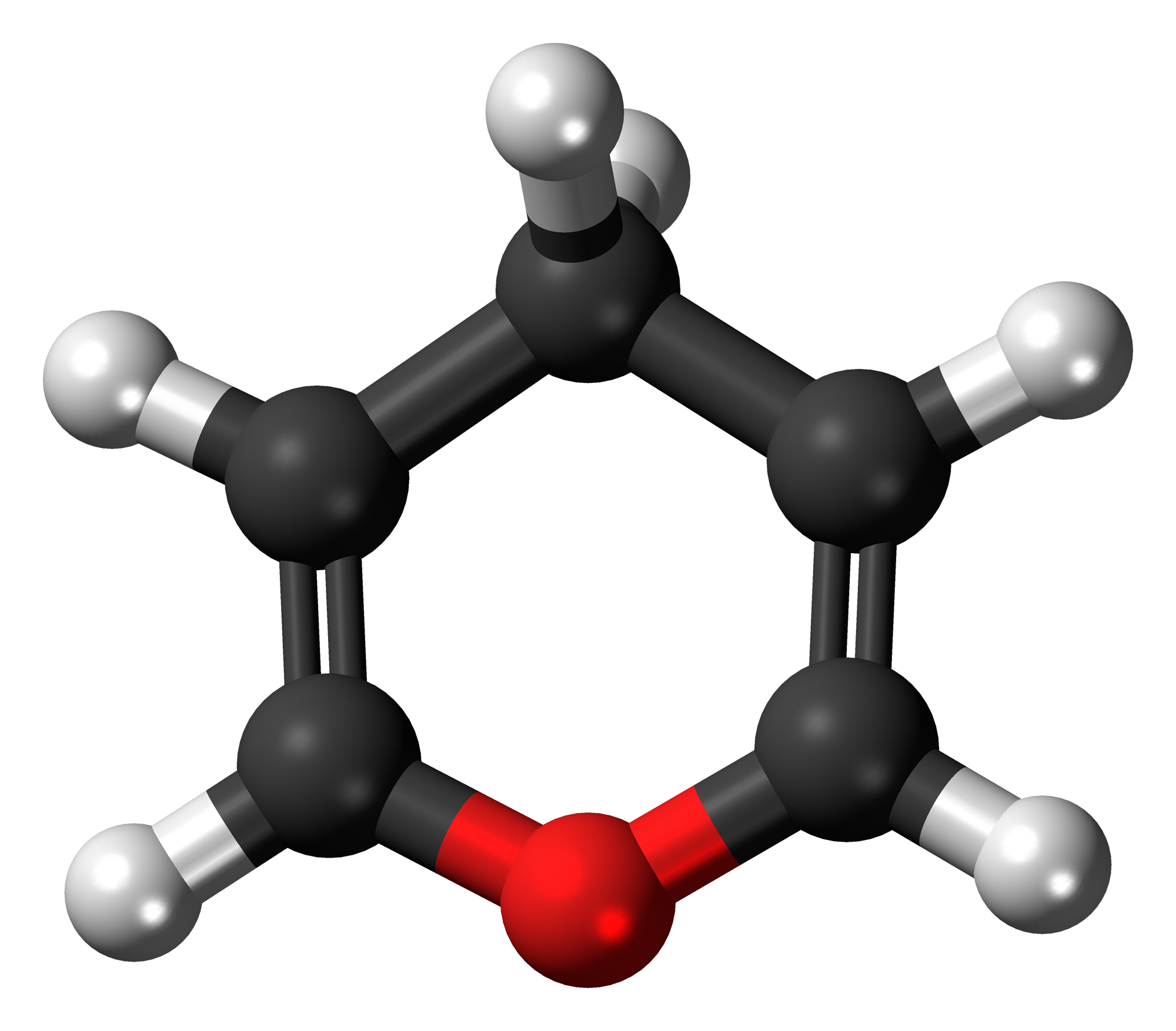

Names
- IUPAC name 2H-Pyran, 4H-Pyran
- Other names 2H-Oxine, 4H-Oxine

Identifiers
CAS Number	289-66-7 (2H); 289-65-6 (4H)
3D model (JSmol)	(2H): Interactive image; (4H): Interactive image
ChemSpider	161812 (2H); 119912 (4H)
PubChem CID	186148 (2H); 136135 (4H)
UNII	CH5P2A5WTT
- InChI: (2H): InChI=1S/C5H6O/c1-2-4-6-5-3-1/h1-4H,5H2 Key: MGADZUXDNSDTHW-UHFFFAOYSA-N; (4H): InChI=1S/C5H6O/c1-2-4-6-5-3-1/h2-5H,1H2 Key: MRUWJENAYHTDQG-UHFFFAOYSA-N
- SMILES: (2H): C1=CC=CCO1; (4H): C1=CCC=CO1

Properties
Chemical formula	C_{5}H_{6}O
Molar mass	82.102 g·mol^{−1}

Related compounds
Related compounds	Dihydropyran; Tetrahydropyran
- Except where otherwise noted, data are given for materials in their standard state (at 25 °C [77 °F], 100 kPa). Infobox references

In chemistry, pyran is a six-membered heterocyclic, non-aromatic ring, consisting of five carbon atoms and one oxygen atom and containing two double bonds. The molecular formula is C_{5}H_{6}O. There are two isomers of pyran that differ by the location of the double bonds. In 2H-pyran, the saturated carbon is at position 2, whereas, in 4H-pyran, the saturated carbon is at position 4. "Oxine” is not used for pyran because it has been used as a trivial name for quinolin-8-ol.

4H-Pyran was first isolated and characterized in 1962 via pyrolysis of 2-acetoxy-3,4-dihydro-2H-pyran. It was found to be unstable, particularly in the presence of air. 4H-pyran easily disproportionates to the corresponding dihydropyran and the pyrylium ion, which is easily hydrolyzed in aqueous medium.

Although the pyrans themselves have little significance in chemistry, many of their derivatives are important biological molecules, such as the pyranoflavonoids.

The term pyran is also often applied to the saturated ring analog, which is more properly referred to as tetrahydropyran (oxane). In this context, the monosaccharides containing a six-membered ring system are known as pyranoses.

== See also ==
- Benzene
- Pyranose
- Furan
- Furfural
- Pyridine
- Pyrone
- Thiopyran
