= Phosphinane =

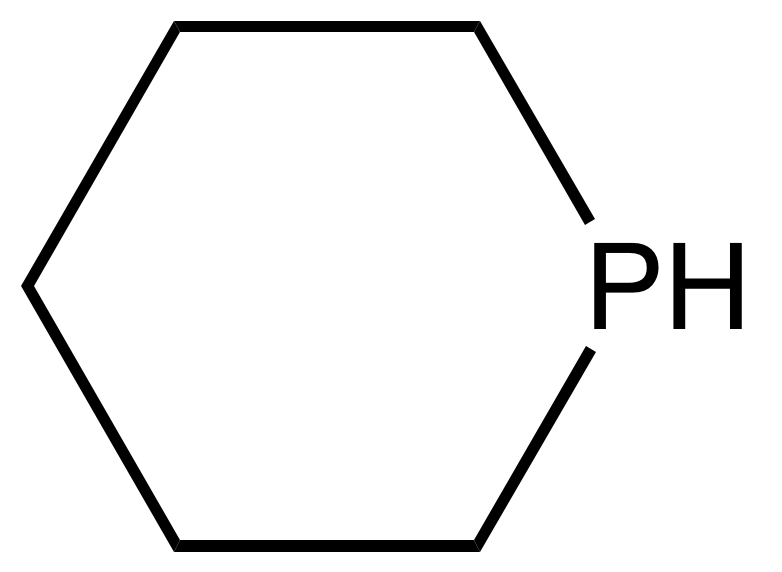

Names
- Preferred IUPAC name Phosphinane
- Other names Phosphacyclohexane

Identifiers
CAS Number	4743-40-2
3D model (JSmol)	Interactive image
ChemSpider	121965
PubChem CID	138339
UNII	HP53H464W5
- InChI: InChI=1S/C5H11P/c1-2-4-6-5-3-1/h6H,1-5H2 Key: VXTFGYMINLXJPW-UHFFFAOYSA-N
- SMILES: C1CCPCC1

Properties
Chemical formula	C_{5}H_{11}P
Molar mass	102.117 g·mol^{−1}
Appearance	colorless liquid
Boiling point	118–121 °C (244–250 °F; 391–394 K)

Related compounds
Related compounds	Phosphorine, Phospholane, Phosphepane, Piperidine, Arsinane, Thiane, Silinane
- Except where otherwise noted, data are given for materials in their standard state (at 25 °C [77 °F], 100 kPa). Infobox references

Phosphinane is the organophosphorus compound with the formula (CH_{2})_{5}PH. This colorless liquid is the parent member of a family of six-membered, saturated rings containing phosphorus. These compounds are mainly of academic interest. The ring adopts a flexible cyclohexane-like chair conformation.

Phosphinane can be prepared via the Arbuzov reaction of triethylphosphite and 1,5-dibromopentane followed by cyclization and reduction steps. Phosphinane can also be prepared by reduction of 1-chlorophosphinane, which in turn is obtained by the reaction of 1-phenylphosphinane and phosphorus trichloride.
