= Aza- =

Prefix used in organic chemistry

Finasteride

4-MA steroid

Homosterone

Finasteride (left), is an aza analog of testosterone (right), with a carbon atom in position 4 (bottom left) replaced by a nitrogen atom.

The prefix aza- is used in organic chemistry to form names of organic compounds where a carbon atom is replaced by a nitrogen atom. The related term "deaza-" refers to when a nitrogen is removed and, usually, a carbon atom is put in its place. Sometimes a number between hyphens is inserted before it to state which atom the nitrogen atom replaces. It arose by shortening the word azote, which is an obsolete name for nitrogen in the English language and occurs in current French usage (azote), meaning "nitrogen".

This prefix is part of the Hantzsch–Widman nomenclature.

While the above figure gives examples of 4-aza steroids, 6-aza steroids have also been developed by GSK, although none of these compounds, as yet, are available for sale commercially.

== See also ==
- IUPAC nomenclature of organic chemistry
