= Thiopyran =

2H-Thiopyran
4H-Thiopyran
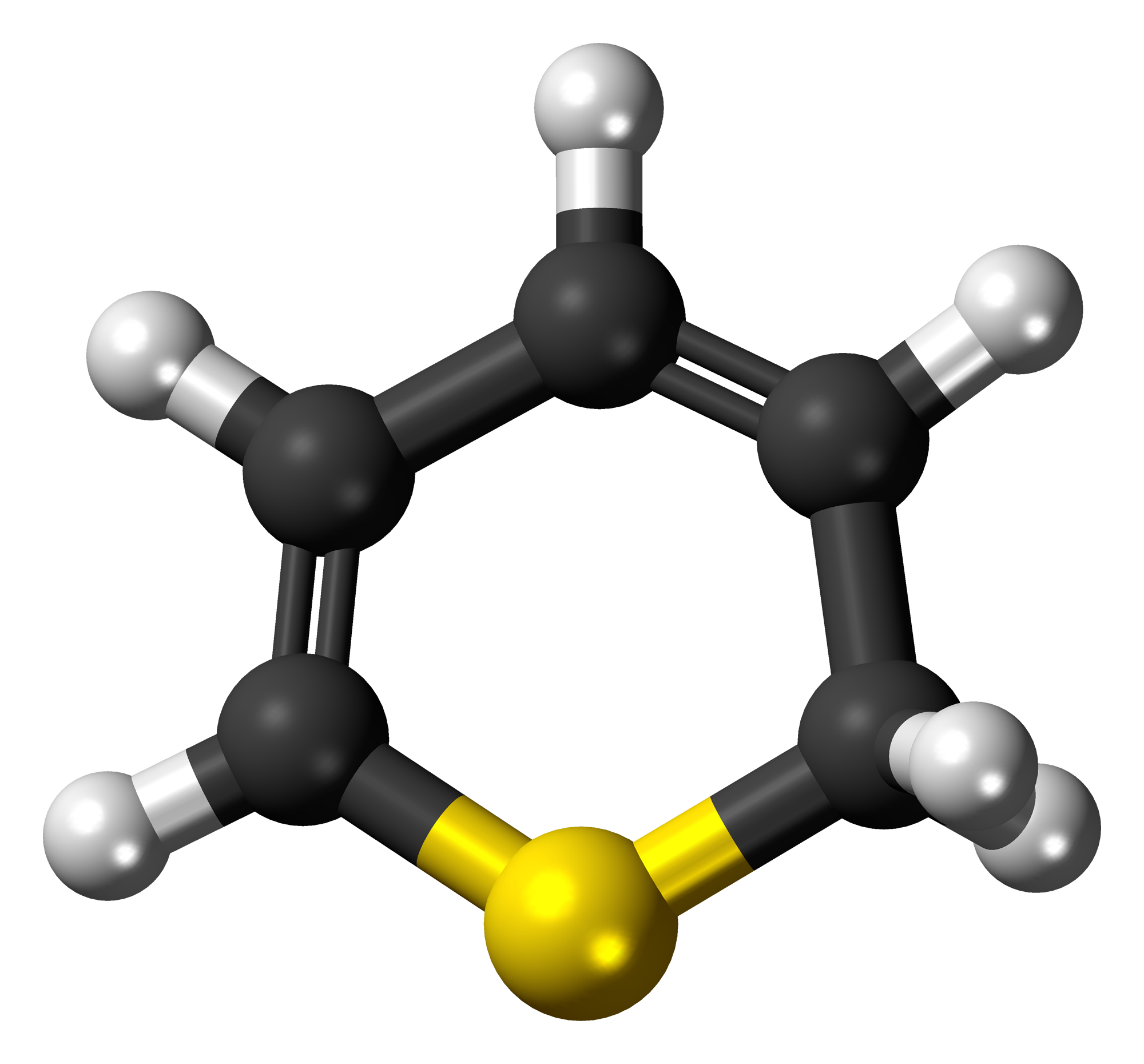

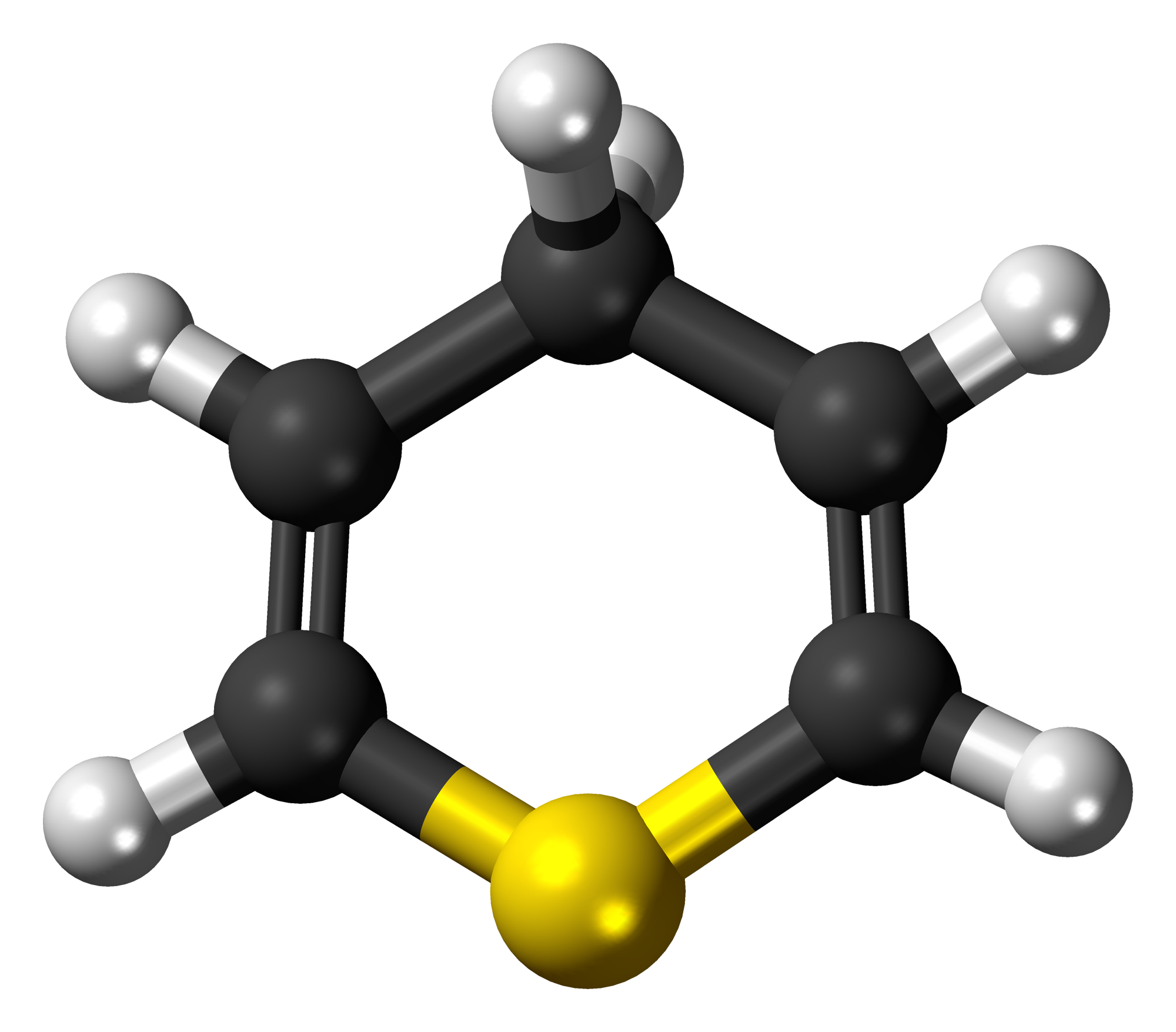

Names
- IUPAC name 2H-Thiopyran; 4H-Thiopyran

Identifiers
CAS Number	(2H): 289-72-5; (4H): 289-70-3
3D model (JSmol)	(2H): Interactive image; (4H): Interactive image
ChemSpider	(2H): 555888; (4H): 119913
PubChem CID	(2H): 640539; (4H): 136136
UNII	(2H): W44DE4RPN2
CompTox Dashboard (EPA)	(2H): DTXSID60348753
- InChI: (2H): InChI=1S/C5H6S/c1-2-4-6-5-3-1/h1-4H,5H2 Key: QMDFJHAAWUGVKQ-UHFFFAOYSA-N; (4H): InChI=1S/C5H6S/c1-2-4-6-5-3-1/h2-5H,1H2 Key: STBGWNRZMPCVTG-UHFFFAOYSA-N
- SMILES: (2H): C1C=CC=CS1; (4H): C1C=CSC=C1

Properties
Chemical formula	C_{5}H_{6}S
Molar mass	98.16 g·mol^{−1}
Density	1.1446g/cm3
Boiling point	241.5 °C (466.7 °F; 514.6 K)
- Except where otherwise noted, data are given for materials in their standard state (at 25 °C [77 °F], 100 kPa). verify (what is ?) Infobox references

Thiopyran is a heterocyclic compound with the chemical formula C_{5}H_{6}S. It has two isomers, 2H-thiopyran and 4H-thiopyran, which differ by the location of double bonds. Thiopyrans are analogous to pyrans in which the oxygen atoms have been replaced by sulfur atoms.

== See also ==
- 6-membered aromatic rings with one carbon replaced by another group: borabenzene, silabenzene, germabenzene, stannabenzene, pyridine, phosphorine, arsabenzene, stibabenzene, bismabenzene
- Thiopyrylium
- Thio-
