= Basic Black 2 =

Names
- Other names Diazine Black; Sumiacryl Black G; Janus Black

Identifiers
| CAS Number | 4443-99-6 |
| 3D model (JSmol) | Interactive image |
| ChemSpider | 8067147 |
| ECHA InfoCard | 100.118.286 |
| PubChem CID | 9891477 |
| UNII | 7ACC9DVV5M |
| CompTox Dashboard (EPA) | DTXSID60432444 |
- InChI: InChI=1S/C28H25N5O.ClH/c1-3-32(4-2)23-13-17-26-28(19-23)33(22-8-6-5-7-9-22)27-18-21(12-16-25(27)29-26)31-30-20-10-14-24(34)15-11-20;/h5-19H,3-4H2,1-2H3;1H Key: VJDDAARZIFHSQY-UHFFFAOYSA-N; InChI=1/C28H25N5O.ClH/c1-3-32(4-2)23-13-17-26-28(19-23)33(22-8-6-5-7-9-22)27-18-21(12-16-25(27)29-26)31-30-20-10-14-24(34)15-11-20;/h5-19H,3-4H2,1-2H3;1H Key: VJDDAARZIFHSQY-UHFFFAOYAT
- SMILES: CCN(CC)C1=CC2=[N+](C3=C(C=CC(=C3)NN=C4C=CC(=O)C=C4)N=C2C=C1)C5=CC=CC=C5.[Cl-]

Properties
| Chemical formula | C_{28}H_{26}ClN_{5}O |
| Molar mass | 484.00 g·mol^{−1} |
- Except where otherwise noted, data are given for materials in their standard state (at 25 °C [77 °F], 100 kPa). Infobox references

Basic Black 2 is a dye of the azine class that is soluble in water. The dye is mostly made to obtain black and green. In water, dark green and light blue might be viewed. In ethanol, red light blue can be observed.
