= 1,4,2-Dithiazole =

Names
- Preferred IUPAC name 5H-1,4,2-Dithiazole

Identifiers
CAS Number	289-12-3
3D model (JSmol)	Interactive image
ChemSpider	11438410
PubChem CID	21943157
UNII	9Z36GFK3RQ
CompTox Dashboard (EPA)	DTXSID101028618
- InChI: InChI=1S/C2H3NS2/c1-3-5-2-4-1/h1H,2H2 Key: MNNJLAZJQBWSST-UHFFFAOYSA-N
- SMILES: C1SC=NS1

Properties
Chemical formula	C_{2}H_{3}NS_{2}
Molar mass	105.17 g·mol^{−1}
- Except where otherwise noted, data are given for materials in their standard state (at 25 °C [77 °F], 100 kPa). verify (what is ?) Infobox references

1,4,2-Dithiazole is a heterocyclic compound consisting of an unsaturated five-membered ring containing two carbon atoms, one nitrogen atom, and two sulfur atoms. 1,4,2-Dithiazole compounds may be formed by the reaction of nitrile sulfide (formed by the thermolysis of oxathiazolone) with various reactive species; for instance thiocarbonyls via a 1,3-dipolar cycloaddition reaction. These compounds may be protonated by strong acids to give synthetically useful aromatic cations.
