= Thiomorpholine =

Chemical compound

Thiomorpholine
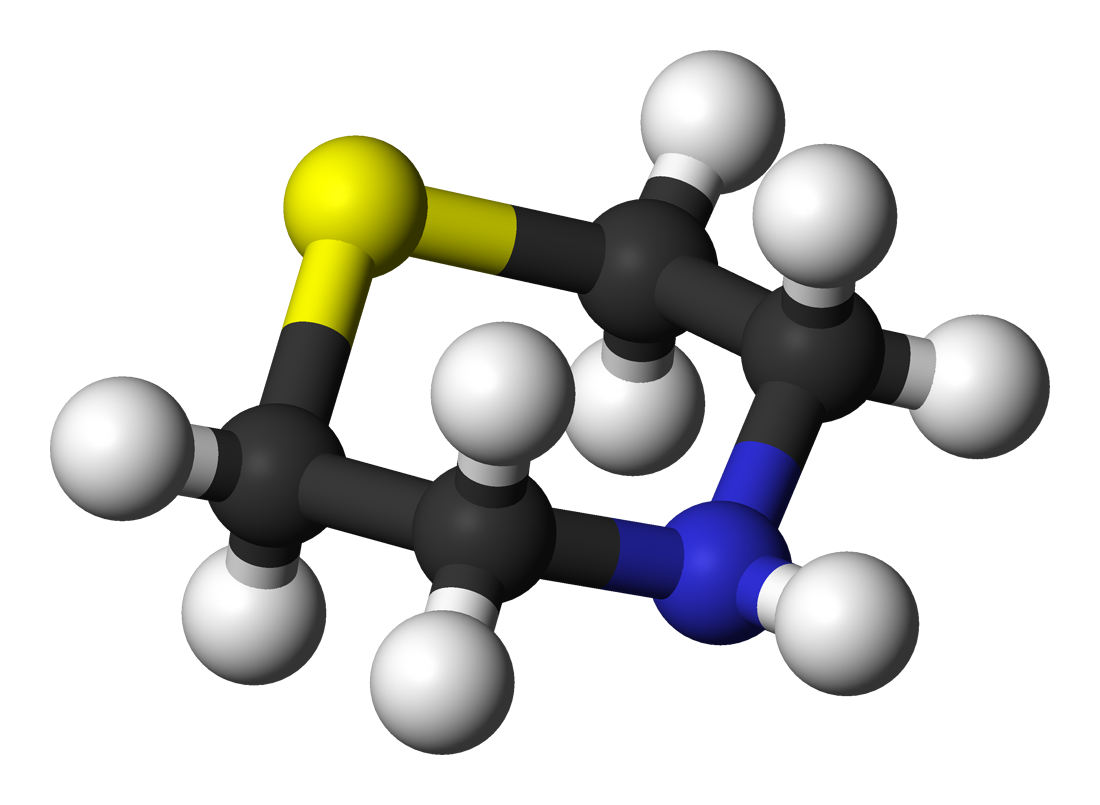

Names
- Preferred IUPAC name Thiomorpholine
- Other names Thiamorpholine

Identifiers
CAS Number	123-90-0
3D model (JSmol)	Interactive image
ChEBI	CHEBI:36392
ChEMBL	ChEMBL2333141
ChemSpider	60509
ECHA InfoCard	100.004.238
PubChem CID	67164
UNII	3A8R61G6QV
CompTox Dashboard (EPA)	DTXSID80153826
- InChI: InChI=1S/C4H9NS/c1-3-6-4-2-5-1/h5H,1-4H2 Key: BRNULMACUQOKMR-UHFFFAOYSA-N; InChI=1/C4H9NS/c1-3-6-4-2-5-1/h5H,1-4H2 Key: BRNULMACUQOKMR-UHFFFAOYAQ
- SMILES: S1CCNCC1

Properties
Chemical formula	C_{4}H_{9}NS
Molar mass	103.18 g·mol^{−1}
Appearance	Colorless liquid
Odor	Strong odor resembling piperidine
Density	1.0882 g/cm^{3}
Boiling point	169 °C (336 °F; 442 K)
Solubility in water	Miscible
- Except where otherwise noted, data are given for materials in their standard state (at 25 °C [77 °F], 100 kPa). verify (what is ?) Infobox references

Thiomorpholine, HN(CH_{2})_{4}S, is a heterocyclic compound containing nitrogen and sulfur. It can be considered a thio analog of morpholine.

It can be prepared from cysteamine and vinyl chloride:

H_{2}NCH_{2}CH_{2}SH + CH_{2}=CHCl → HN(CH_{2})_{4}S + HCl
