= Thiazine =

Organic compound

1,4-Thiazine

Names
- Preferred IUPAC name 4H-1,4-Thiazine
- Other names Parathiazine

Identifiers
CAS Number	290-57-3; 1,2: 11084-06-3; 1,3: 27813-20-3
3D model (JSmol)	1,2: Interactive image; 1,3: Interactive image; 1,4: Interactive image
ChemSpider	1,2: 10609054; 1,3: 10609007; 1,4: 10465777
PubChem CID	1,2: 15789245; 1,3: 15789246; 1,4: 15789247
CompTox Dashboard (EPA)	1,2: DTXSID50911874; 1,3: DTXSID50578325
- InChI: 1,2: InChI=1S/C4H5NS/c1-2-4-6-5-3-1/h1-5H Key: AGIJRRREJXSQJR-UHFFFAOYSA-N; 1,3: InChI=1S/C4H5NS/c1-2-5-4-6-3-1/h1-3H,4H2 Key: NTYABNDBNKVWOO-UHFFFAOYSA-N; 1,4: InChI=1S/C4H5NS/c1-3-6-4-2-5-1/h1-5H Key: ZOXMLSDKXHNVOQ-UHFFFAOYSA-N
- SMILES: 1,2: C1=CNSC=C1; 1,3: C1N=CC=CS1; 1,4: C\1=C\N\C=C/S/1

Properties
Chemical formula	C_{4}H_{5}NS
Molar mass	99.15 g·mol^{−1}
Density	0.8465 g/cm^{3}
Boiling point	76.5 °C
- Except where otherwise noted, data are given for materials in their standard state (at 25 °C [77 °F], 100 kPa). verify (what is ?) Infobox references

Thiazine /ˈθaɪəziːn/ is an organic compound containing a ring of four carbon, one nitrogen and one sulfur atom. There are three isomers of thiazine, 1,2-thiazine, 1,3-thiazine, and 1,4-thiazine, which differ by the arrangement of the nitrogen and sulfur atoms in the ring.

Derivatives of thiazine, often referred to as thiazines, are used for dyes, tranquilizers and insecticides.

== Preparation ==
1,4-thiazine can be prepared by reduction of the corresponding dicarbonyl using aluminium powder at high temperature.

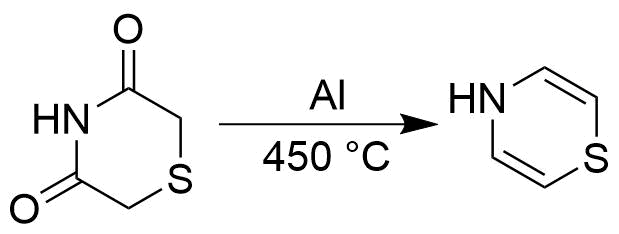
Synthesis of 1,4-thiazine.

== Tautomers ==
There are three tautomeric forms:

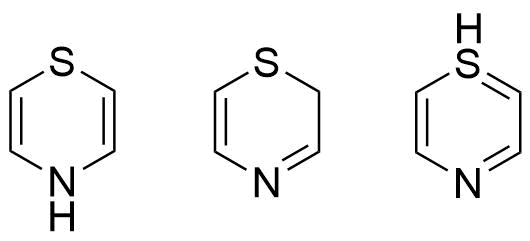

== See also ==
- Methylene blue, contains a related ring with nitrogen and a positively charged sulfur atom
- Phenothiazine, a thiazine fused with two benzene rings
- Thiomorpholine, a saturated analog of thiazine
