= Borazocine =

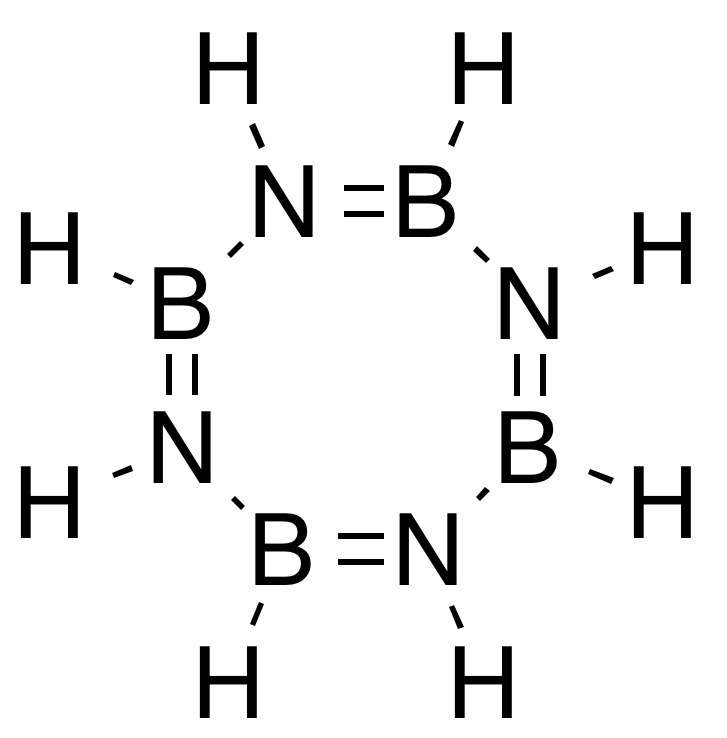

Names
- Other names tetrameric borazyne; octahydro-1,3,5,7,2,4,6,8-tetrazatetraborocine

Identifiers
CAS Number	4746-02-5
3D model (JSmol)	Interactive image
PubChem CID	139244860
CompTox Dashboard (EPA)	DTXSID701337247
- InChI: InChI=1S/B4H8N4/c1-5-2-7-4-8-3-6-1/h1-8H Key: JQFOMZSISARZAI-UHFFFAOYSA-N
- SMILES: [BH-]\1=[NH+]\[BH-]=[NH+]/[BH-]=[NH+]\[BH-]=[NH+]1

Properties
Chemical formula	B_{4}H_{8}N_{4}
Molar mass	107.33 g·mol^{−1}
- Except where otherwise noted, data are given for materials in their standard state (at 25 °C [77 °F], 100 kPa). Infobox references

Borazocine is a polar inorganic compound with the chemical formula B_{4}H_{8}N_{4}. In this cyclic compound, the four BH units and four NH units alternate.

== Related compounds ==
Borazine is a six-membered aromatic ring with three boron atoms and three nitrogen atoms.

== See also ==
- 1,2-Dihydro-1,2-azaborine
- Cyclooctatetraene
