= Azete =

Names
- Preferred IUPAC name Azete
- Systematic IUPAC name Azacyclobutadiene
- Other names Azetine

Identifiers
CAS Number	287-24-1
3D model (JSmol)	Interactive image
ChemSpider	14804701
PubChem CID	20185374
CompTox Dashboard (EPA)	DTXSID90603281
- InChI: InChI=1S/C3H3N/c1-2-4-3-1/h1-3H Key: LKSPYOVNNMPMIZ-UHFFFAOYSA-N; InChI=1/C3H3N/c1-2-4-3-1/h1-3H Key: LKSPYOVNNMPMIZ-UHFFFAOYAS
- SMILES: C1=CN=C1

Properties
Chemical formula	C_{3}H_{3}N
Molar mass	53.064 g·mol^{−1}
- Except where otherwise noted, data are given for materials in their standard state (at 25 °C [77 °F], 100 kPa). verify (what is ?) Infobox references

Azete, also known as azacyclobutadiene, is a heterocyclic compound consisting of an unsaturated four-membered ring with three carbon atoms and one nitrogen atom. It is inherently unstable due to its 4π-electron antiaromatic character and the strain of the four-membered ring.

Azete is the most unsaturated four-membered nitrogen heterocycle and is formally the nitrogen analogue of cyclobutadiene. Its parent structure is highly strained and antiaromatic, accounting for its pronounced instability and reactivity. Azetes occur in unfused forms, where the ring is isolated, and in benzo-fused variants, which gain stability from aromatic conjugation with a benzene ring.

== Structure and electronic properties ==
Azete features a four-membered ring, with one atom replaced by nitrogen. Quantum chemical calculations indicate the molecule is antiaromatic, possessing negative resonance energy and a ground state that leans towards Singlet state stabilization, though less antiaromatic than cyclobutadiene. The nitrogen atom breaks degeneracy of the non-bonding orbitals, which helps mitigate some of the instability seen in cyclobutadiene itself. Experimental attempts confirm azete’s fleeting existence: isolable examples such as tris(dimethylamino)azete (a red solid, stable only at very low temperatures) and various benzo-fused azetes, which can be manipulated and trapped below freezing, have been documented.

== Synthesis ==
Azetes are typically generated via ring contraction or extrusion of small molecules (often nitrogen) from larger heterocyclic precursors. For example, vapor-phase pyrolysis of substituted benzo-triazines yields benzo-fused azetes in up to 60% yield as the major compound at −80 °C. Thermolysis of tertiary-alkyl cyclopropene azides is another efficient route, exploiting the heightened stability conferred by bulky substituents and London dispersion forces. These strategies underscore the challenges posed by the inherent strain and antiaromaticity of the azete ring.

== Reactivity ==
Due to their antiaromaticity and strain, azetes are extraordinarily reactive. They readily undergo fragmentation into acetylenes and nitriles, even in inert conditions, by cycloreversion processes. They are also prone to rapid dimerization, acting as dienes or dienophiles in cycloaddition reactions. Benzo-fused azetes, in particular, exhibit useful chemical behavior, dimerizing via a Diels-Alder-type mechanism and participating in a range of cycloadditions with reactive partners such as isobenzofuran and tetraphenylcyclopentenone, yielding structurally diverse and complex organic compounds.

== Applications ==
Although azetes themselves are rarely isolated in pure form and lack direct practical applications due to instability, their reactivity has been harnessed in synthetic organic chemistry to access various intermediates and fused ring systems. The use of azete precursors and azete-based reactions enables the construction of complex molecular architectures relevant to medicinal chemistry and material sciences.

== See also ==
- Azetidine, the saturated analog
- Cyclobutadiene, the homocyclic analog
