= Thiepane =

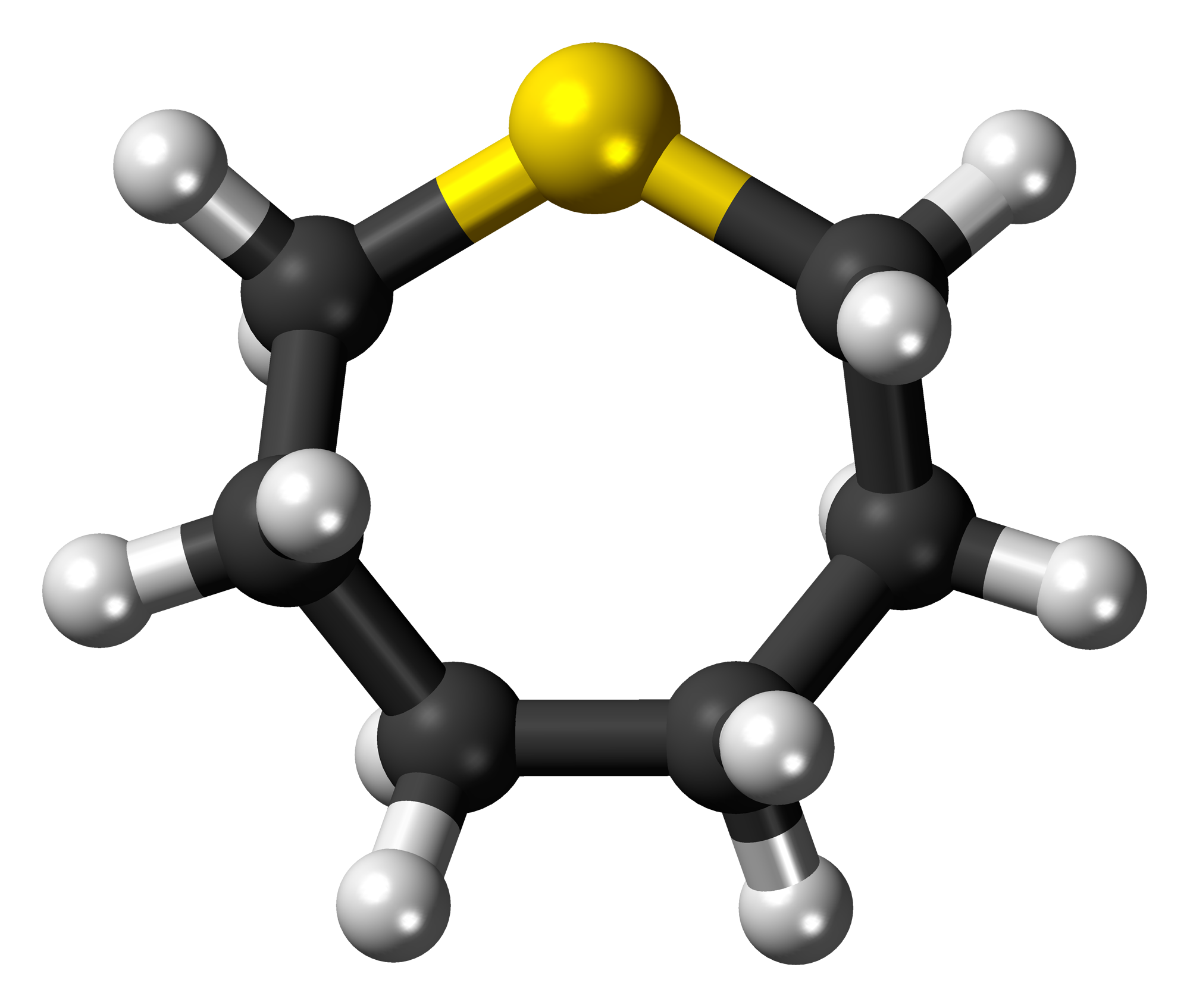

Names
- Preferred IUPAC name Thiepane

Identifiers
CAS Number	4753-80-4
3D model (JSmol)	Interactive image
ChemSpider	70858
ECHA InfoCard	100.022.981
EC Number	225-279-8
PubChem CID	78493
UNII	0P85C3FTE3
CompTox Dashboard (EPA)	DTXSID80197189
- InChI: InChI=1S/C6H12S/c1-2-4-6-7-5-3-1/h1-6H2 Key: JWCVYQRPINPYQJ-UHFFFAOYSA-N
- SMILES: C1CCCSCC1

Properties
Chemical formula	C_{6}H_{12}S
Molar mass	116.22 g·mol^{−1}
- Except where otherwise noted, data are given for materials in their standard state (at 25 °C [77 °F], 100 kPa). verify (what is ?) Infobox references

Thiepane (also hexathiophane) is the organosulfur compound with the formula (CH_{2})_{6}S. Thiepanes are seven-membered ring heterocycles that contains sulfide. The parent thiepane has seldom been studied.

A variety of derivatives are known. Hexathiathiepane (CAS RN 17233-71-5, m.p. 90 °C) is CH_{2}S_{6}. A naturally occurring derivative is lenthionine, 1,4-(CH_{2})_{2}S_{5}.

Thiepane itself may be a product of spontaneous coal fires in post-mining waste heaps.
