= Oxazepine =

1,2-Oxazepine
- 1,2-Oxazepine, one of the isomers of oxazepine

Names
- IUPAC name 1,2-Oxazepine

Identifiers
CAS Number	1,2-: 291-79-2; 1,4-: 292-10-4
3D model (JSmol)	1,2-: Interactive image; 1,4-: Interactive image
ChemSpider	1,2-: 11418660
PubChem CID	1,2-: 13781592; 1,4-: 17860191
- InChI: InChI=1S/C5H5NO/c1-2-4-6-7-5-3-1/h1-5H Key: SFJGCXYXEFWEBK-UHFFFAOYSA-N; 1,2-: InChI=1S/C5H5NO/c1-2-4-6-7-5-3-1/h1-5H Key: SFJGCXYXEFWEBK-UHFFFAOYSA-N; 1,4-: InChI=1S/C5H5NO/c1-2-6-3-5-7-4-1/h1-5H Key: WXLCDTBTIVJDCE-UHFFFAOYSA-N
- SMILES: 1,2-: C1=CC=NOC=C1; 1,4-: C1=COC=CN=C1

Properties
Chemical formula	C_{5}H_{7}NO
Molar mass	97.117 g·mol^{−1}
- Except where otherwise noted, data are given for materials in their standard state (at 25 °C [77 °F], 100 kPa). Infobox references

Oxazepines are a family of unsaturated heterocycles containing seven atoms, with a nitrogen replacing a carbon at one position and with an oxygen replacing a carbon at one position.

== See also ==
- Azepine
- Benzazepines
- Diazepine
- Oxepin
- Borepin
- CR gas (dibenzoxazepine)
