= Dioxazolone =

Organic compound

General chemical structure of a 1,3,4-dioxazol-2-one

In organic chemistry, a dioxazolone is a cyclic carbonate incorporated into C_{2}NO_{2} ring. It is an uncommon heterocyclic compound. They arise by the phosgenation of hydroxamic acids:

RC(O)NHOH + COCl_{2} → RC=NO_{2}CO + 2 HCl

Although dioxazolones are often explosive, they are of interest as precursors to isocyanates:

RC=NO_{2}CO → R-N=C=O + CO_{2}

Dioxazolones have attracted attention as reagents for the preparation of amides.
