= Oxetene =

Names
- Preferred IUPAC name 2H-Oxete
- Systematic IUPAC name 1-Oxacyclobut-2-ene

Identifiers
CAS Number	287-25-2
3D model (JSmol)	Interactive image
Beilstein Reference	4652799
ChEBI	CHEBI:51195
ChemSpider	10143952
PubChem CID	11970569
CompTox Dashboard (EPA)	DTXSID20474941
- InChI: InChI=1S/C3H4O/c1-2-4-3-1/h1-2H,3H2 Key: CRYATLIDHPPXDV-UHFFFAOYSA-N
- SMILES: O1\C=C/C1

Properties
Chemical formula	C_{3}H_{4}O
Molar mass	56.06326
- Except where otherwise noted, data are given for materials in their standard state (at 25 °C [77 °F], 100 kPa). verify (what is ?) Infobox references

Oxetene is an unsaturated heterocycle. The compound is unstable and has been synthesized. Compared to oxetane, the saturated compound, oxetene is destabilized because the double bond increases the ring strain. Synthesis of some substituted derivatives has been reported.

Oxetene is less studied than oxetane, a related compound that is the base of a number of organic molecules.

== Synthesis ==
Oxetene can be synthesised by the photochemical cyclization of acrolein:

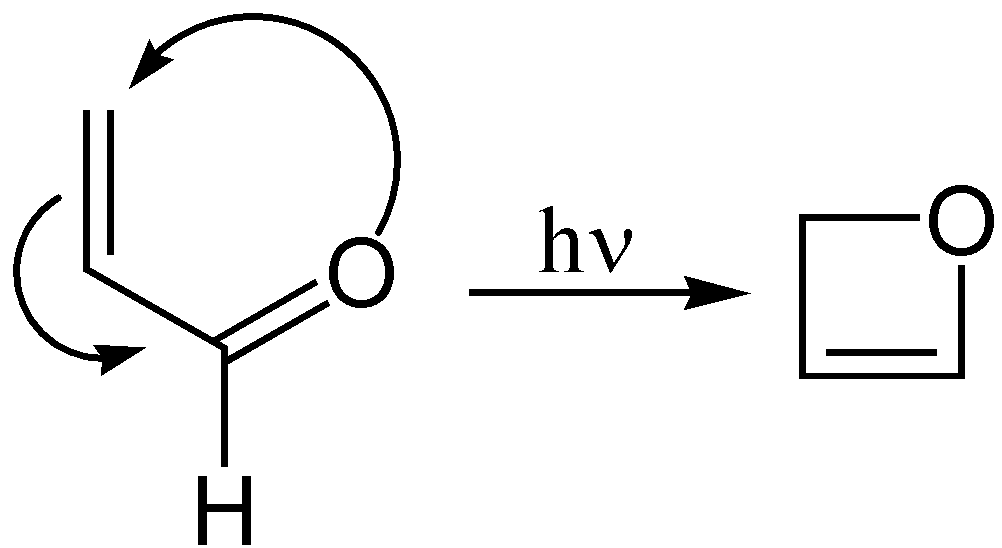
