= Thiane =

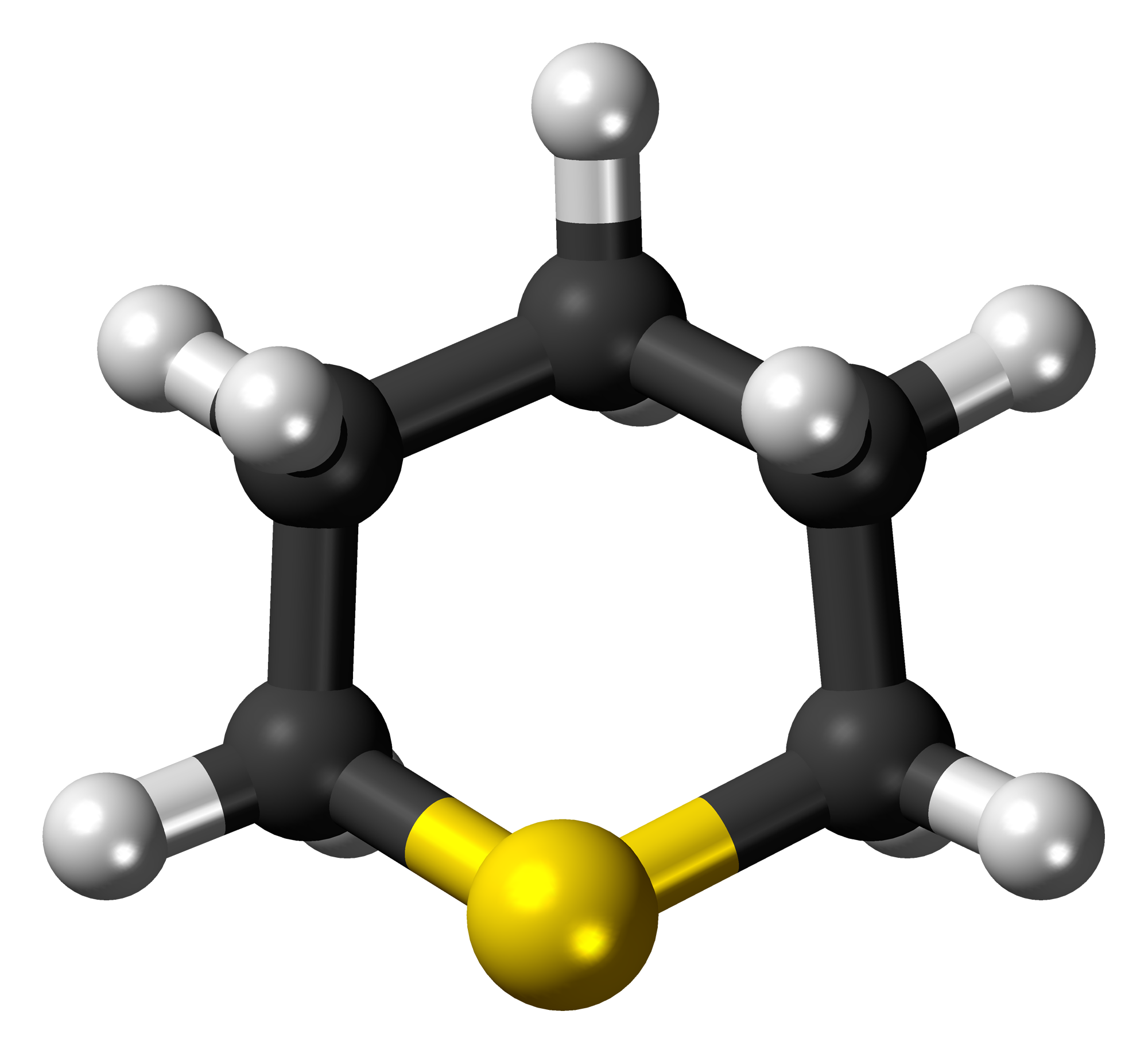

Names
- Preferred IUPAC name Thiane
- Other names Tetrahydro-2H-thiopyran

Identifiers
CAS Number	1613-51-0
3D model (JSmol)	Interactive image
ChemSpider	14628
ECHA InfoCard	100.015.056
EC Number	216-561-1
PubChem CID	15367
UNII	P9BB3YF628
CompTox Dashboard (EPA)	DTXSID60167108
- InChI: InChI=1S/C5H10S/c1-2-4-6-5-3-1/h1-5H2 Key: YPWFISCTZQNZAU-UHFFFAOYSA-N; InChI=1/C5H10S/c1-2-4-6-5-3-1/h1-5H2 Key: YPWFISCTZQNZAU-UHFFFAOYAV
- SMILES: C1CCSCC1

Properties
Chemical formula	C_{5}H_{10}S
Molar mass	102.1979
Appearance	colorless liquid
Density	0.9943 g/cm^{3}
Melting point	19 °C
Boiling point	141.8 °C

Hazards
- GHS labelling
Pictograms	(GHS05: Corrosive)
Signal word	Danger
Hazard statements	H225
Precautionary statements	P210, P233, P240, P241, P242, P243, P280, P303+P361+P353, P370+P378, P403+P235, P501
- Except where otherwise noted, data are given for materials in their standard state (at 25 °C [77 °F], 100 kPa). verify (what is ?) Infobox references

Thiane is a heterocyclic compound and an organosulfur compound with the formula (CH_{2})_{5}S. It is a saturated six-membered ring with five carbon atoms and one sulfur atom. The compound is a colorless liquid. It can be prepared by the reaction of 1,5-dibromopentane with sodium sulfide:

Br-(CH_{2})_{5}-Br + Na_{2}S → (CH_{2})_{5}S + 2NaBr
