= Thiirene =

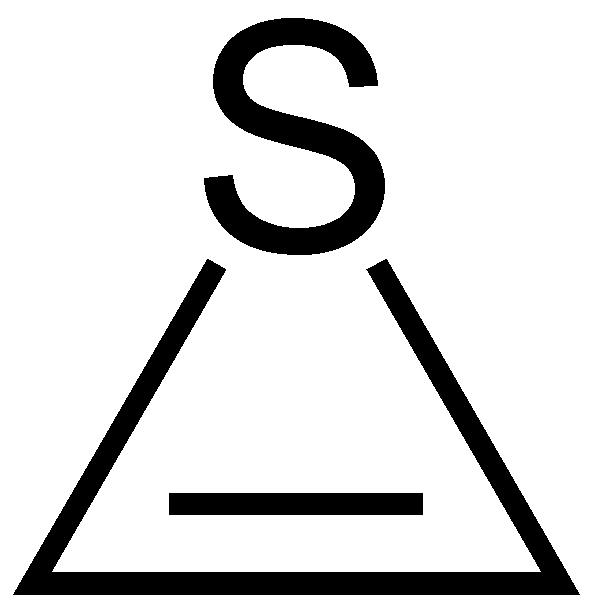

Names
- Preferred IUPAC name Thiirene
- Systematic IUPAC name Thiacyclopropene
- Other names Epithioethene; Ethyne sulfide Acetylene sulfide

Identifiers
CAS Number	157-20-0
3D model (JSmol)	Interactive image
Beilstein Reference	1304471
ChEBI	CHEBI:30976
ChemSpider	4574411
Gmelin Reference	239545
PubChem CID	5461041
CompTox Dashboard (EPA)	DTXSID00420123
- InChI: InChI=1S/C2H2S/c1-2-3-1/h1-2H Key: JTQAPFZZCXWQNQ-UHFFFAOYSA-N; InChI=1/C2H2S/c1-2-3-1/h1-2H Key: JTQAPFZZCXWQNQ-UHFFFAOYAN
- SMILES: C1=CS1

Properties
Chemical formula	C_{2}H_{2}S
Molar mass	58.10228
- Except where otherwise noted, data are given for materials in their standard state (at 25 °C [77 °F], 100 kPa). verify (what is ?) Infobox references

Thiirene is an organosulfur compound with the formula C_{2}H_{2}S. It can be viewed as a derivative of cyclopropene, but with the methylene group replaced by sulfur. It is antiaromatic and very labile.

== Thiirenes and derivatives ==
No thiirene has been isolated at room temperature, but they have been observed spectroscopically at low temperatures.

Thiirene-S-oxides and S-alkylthiirenium salts have been characterized by X-ray crystallography.
