= Hantzsch–Widman nomenclature =

Naming system for certain heterocyclic organic compounds

In organic chemistry, Hantzsch–Widman nomenclature, also called the extended Hantzsch–Widman system (named for Arthur Rudolf Hantzsch and Karl Oskar Widman), is a type of systematic chemical nomenclature used for naming heterocyclic parent hydrides having no more than ten ring members. Some common heterocyclic compounds have retained names that do not follow the Hantzsch–Widman pattern.

A Hantzsch–Widman name will always contain a prefix, which indicates the type of heteroatom present in the ring, and a stem, which indicates both the total number of atoms and the presence or absence of double bonds. The name may include more than one prefix, if more than one type of heteroatom is present; a multiplicative prefix if there are several heteroatoms of the same type; and locants to indicate the relative positions of the different atoms. Hantzsch–Widman names may be combined with other aspects of organic nomenclature, to indicate substitution or fused-ring systems.

== Prefixes ==
Element	Prefix	Element	Prefix
Fluorine	fluora	Antimony	stiba
Chlorine	chlora	Bismuth	bisma
Bromine	broma	Silicon	sila
Iodine	ioda	Germanium	germa
Oxygen	oxa	Tin	stanna
Sulfur	thia	Lead	plumba
Selenium	selena	Boron	bora
Tellurium	tellura	Aluminium	aluma
Nitrogen	aza	Gallium	galla
Phosphorus	phospha	Indium	indiga
Arsenic	arsa	Thallium	thalla
		Mercury	mercura (removed)

The Hantzsch–Widman prefixes indicate the type of heteroatom(s) present in the ring. They form a priority series: If there is more than one type of heteroatom in the ring, the prefix that is higher on the list comes before the prefix that is lower on the list. For example, "oxa" (for oxygen) always comes before "aza" (for nitrogen) in a name. The priority order is the same as that used in substitutive nomenclature, but Hantzsch–Widman nomenclature is recommended only for use with a more restricted set of heteroatoms (see also below). (Note: The 2004 Draft Recommendations propose adding aluminium (aluma), gallium (galla), indium (indiga) and thallium (thalla) to the list of heteroatoms for which Hantzsch–Widman nomenclature is used, and removing mercury.)

All of the prefixes end in "a": In Hantzsch–Widman nomenclature (but not in some other methods of naming heterocycles), the final "a" is elided when the prefix comes before a vowel.

The heteroatom is assumed to have its standard bonding number for organic chemistry while the name is being constructed. The halogens have a standard bonding number of one, and so a heterocyclic ring containing a halogen as a heteroatom should have a formal positive charge. In principle, lambda nomenclature could be used to specify a non-standard valence state for a heteroatom but, in practice, this is rare.

== Stems ==
The choice of stem is quite complicated, and not completely standardised. The main criteria are:

- the total number of atoms in the ring, both carbon atoms and heteroatoms ("ring size")
- the presence of any double bonds
- the nature of the heteroatoms.

Notes on table:

1. Heteroatom priority decreases as follows: F, Cl, Br, I, O, S, Se, Te, N, P, As, Sb, Bi, Si, Ge, Sn, Pb, B, Al, Ga, In, Tl, Hg.
2. Names in parentheses indicate ending when nitrogen is present.
3. The parent compound for unsaturated ring systems is the one containing the maximal number of non-cumulated double bonds (known as the mancude ring system). Compounds with an intermediate number of double bonds are named as the hydrogenated derivatives of the mancude ring.

Ring size		Saturated	Unsaturated
3		-irane (-iridine)	-irene (-irine)
4		-etane (-etidine)	-ete
5		-olane (-olidine)	-ole
6A	O, S, Se, Te; Bi	-ane	-ine
6B	N; Si, Ge, Sn, Pb	-inane	-ine
6C	F, Cl, Br, I; P, As, Sb; B, Al, Ga, In, Tl	-inane	-inine
7		-epane	-epine
8		-ocane	-ocine
9		-onane	-onine
10		-ecane	-ecine

== History ==
Hantzsch–Widman nomenclature is named after the German chemist Arthur Hantzsch and the Swedish chemist Oskar Widman, who independently proposed similar methods for the systematic naming of heterocyclic compounds in 1887 and 1888 respectively. It forms the basis for many common chemical names, such as dioxin and benzodiazepine.
