= Stibabenzene =

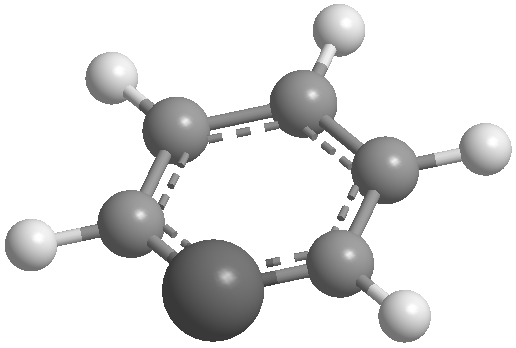
The white balls represent hydrogens, the light gray balls represent carbons, and the dark gray ball represents antimony

Names
- Preferred IUPAC name Stibinine
- Other names Antimonin; Stibinin

Identifiers
CAS Number	289-75-8
3D model (JSmol)	Interactive image
ChemSpider	119914
PubChem CID	136137
CompTox Dashboard (EPA)	DTXSID90183098
- InChI: InChI=1S/C5H5.Sb/c1-3-5-4-2;/h1-5H; Key: JRKNFVZITCJKDC-UHFFFAOYSA-N
- SMILES: C1=CC=[Sb]C=C1

Properties
Chemical formula	C_{5}H_{5}Sb
Molar mass	186.855 g·mol^{−1}
- Except where otherwise noted, data are given for materials in their standard state (at 25 °C [77 °F], 100 kPa). Infobox references

Stibabenzene is an organic chemical compound. Stibabenzene has the chemical formula C_{5}H_{5}Sb. The molecule is a derivative of benzene, with one of the carbon atoms in the 6-membered ring replaced by an antimony (Sb) atom. Stibabenzene is considered to be an organoantimony compound due to it containing carbon, hydrogen, and antimony atoms.

Bond lengths and angles of benzene, pyridine, phosphorine, arsabenzene, stibabenzene, and bismabenzene

== Laboratory synthesis ==
The synthesis of stibabenzene can be accomplished in a three step process. The final product can be isolated, even though the molecule is highly labile. The first step of this synthesis involves the treatment of penta-1,4-diyne with dibutylstannane as shown in the figure below.

C_{5}H_{4} + Bu_{2}SnH_{2} → C_{13}H_{24}Sn

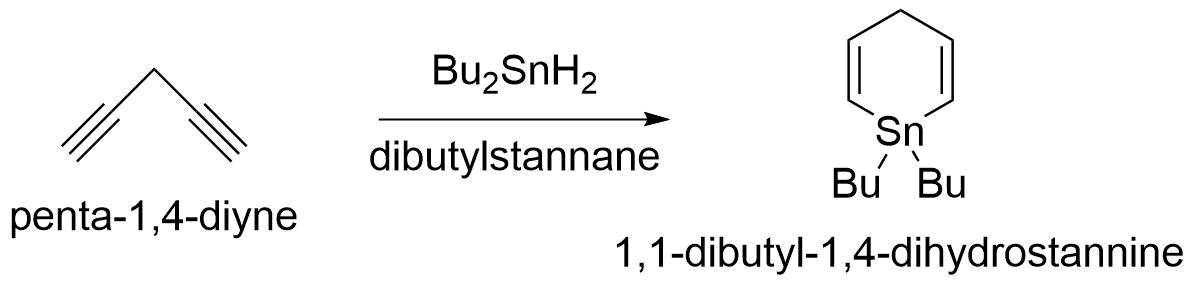

The second step of the synthesis involves reacting the product of the first step, 1,1-dibutyl-1,4-dihydrostannine, with antimony trichloride, to yield 1-chloro-1-stibacyclohexa-2,5-diene.

C_{13}H_{24}Sn + SbCl_{3} → C_{5}H_{6}SbCl

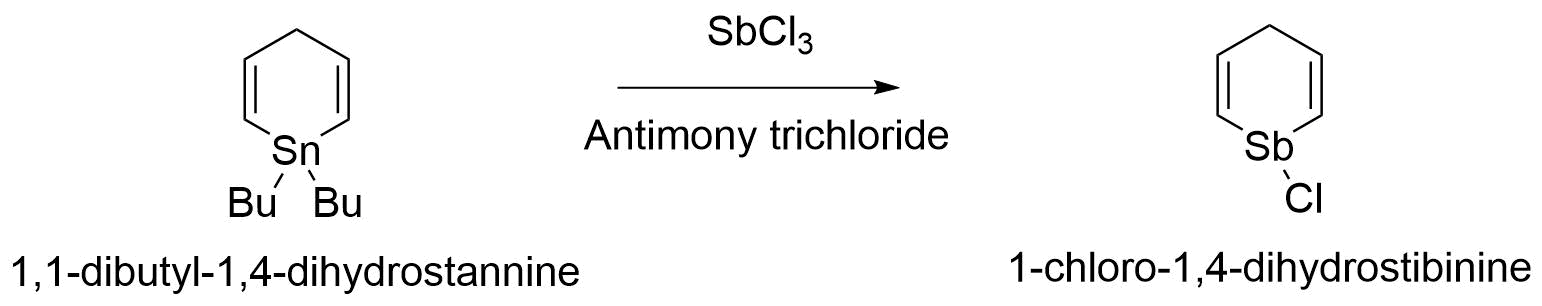

The final step of the synthesis of stibabenzene involves treating 1-chloro-1-stibacyclohexa-2,5-diene with a base, such as DBN, to yield the final product of stibabenzene.

C_{5}H_{6}SbCl + DBN → C_{5}H_{6}Sb

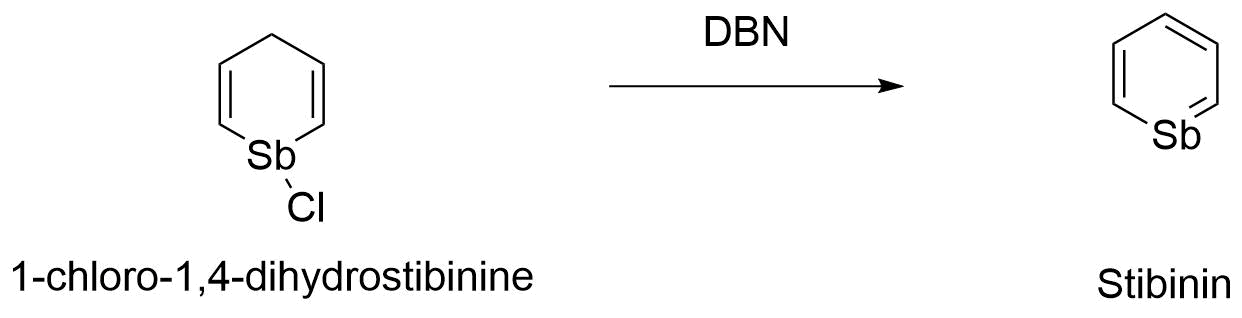

== Similar compounds ==
It is noted that other benzene derivatives with one carbon replaced with a group 15 element can be synthesized via a similar synthetic pathway to that which stibabenzene is synthesized. The reaction of 1,1-dibutyl-1,4-dihydrostannine with arsenic trichloride, phosphorus tribromide, or bismuth trichloride can yield arsabenzene, phosphabenzene, or 1-chloro-1-bismacyclohexa-2,5-diene respectively. Treatment of 1-chloro-1-bismacyclohexa-2,5-diene with a base, such as DBN, can yield the product bismabenzene.

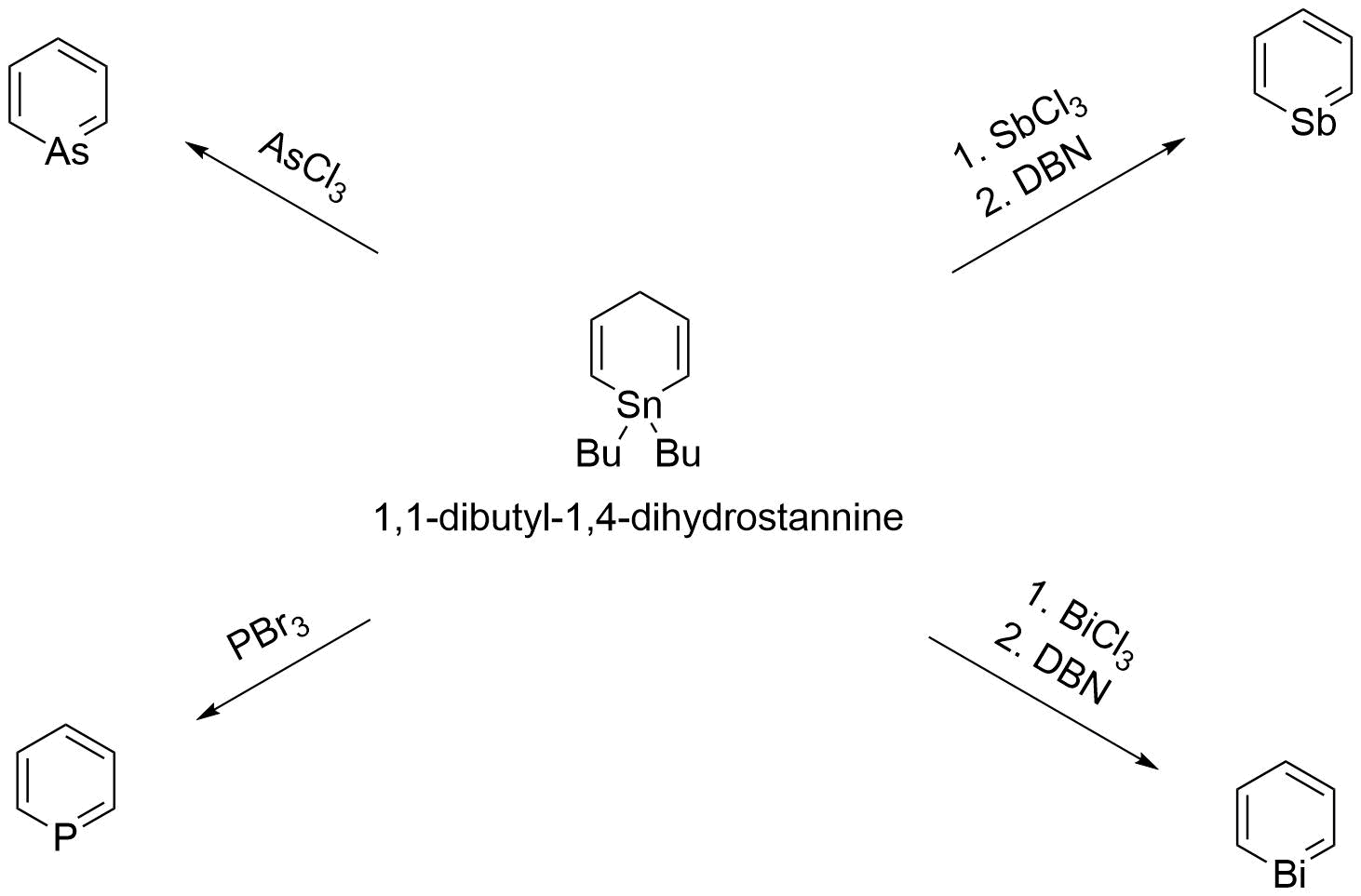
The four different reaction pathways possible from 1,1-dibutyl-1,4-dihydrostannin to form the products arsabenzene, phosphabenzene, bismabenzene, and stibabenzene.

== See also ==
- 6-membered aromatic rings with one carbon replaced by another group: borabenzene, silabenzene, germabenzene, stannabenzene, pyridine, phosphorine, arsabenzene, stibabenzene, bismabenzene, pyrylium, thiopyrylium, selenopyrylium, telluropyrylium
