= Cyclic compound =

Molecule with a ring of bonded atoms

A cyclic compound (or ring compound) is a chemical compound which includes a ring. Rings have three or more atoms, and include examples where all the atoms are carbon (i.e., are carbocycles), none of the atoms are carbon (inorganic cyclic compounds), or where both carbon and non-carbon atoms are present (heterocyclic compounds with rings containing both carbon and non-carbon). Depending on the ring size, the bond order of the individual links between ring atoms, and their arrangements within the rings, carbocyclic and heterocyclic compounds may be aromatic or non-aromatic; in the latter case, they may vary from being fully saturated to having varying numbers of multiple bonds between the ring atoms. Because of the tremendous diversity allowed, in combination, by the valences of common atoms and their ability to form rings, the number of possible cyclic structures, even of small size (e.g., < 17 total atoms) numbers in the many billions.

Cyclic compound examples: All-carbon (carbocyclic) and more complex natural cyclic compounds

Cycloalkanes, the simplest carbocycles, including cyclopropane, cyclobutane, cyclopentane, and cyclohexane. Note, elsewhere an organic chemistry shorthand is used where hydrogen atoms are inferred as present to fill the carbon's valence of 4 (rather than their being shown explicitly).

Ingenol, a complex, terpenoid natural product, related to but simpler than the paclitaxel that follows, which displays a complex ring structure including 3-, 5-, and 7-membered non-aromatic, carbocyclic rings.

Paclitaxel, another complex, plant-derived terpenoid, also a natural product, displaying a complex multi-ring structure including 4-, 6-, and 8-membered rings (carbocyclic and heterocyclic, aromatic and non-aromatic).

Adding to their complexity and number, closing of atoms into rings may lock particular atoms with distinct substitution (by functional groups) such that stereochemistry and chirality of the compound results, including some manifestations that are unique to rings (e.g., configurational isomers). As well, depending on ring size, the three-dimensional shapes of particular cyclic structures – typically rings of five atoms and larger – can vary and interconvert such that conformational isomerism is displayed. Indeed, the development of this important chemical concept arose historically in reference to cyclic compounds. Finally, cyclic compounds, because of the unique shapes, reactivities, properties, and bioactivities that they engender, are the majority of all molecules involved in the biochemistry, structure, and function of living organisms, and in man-made molecules such as drugs, pesticides, etc.

== Structure and classification ==
A cyclic compound or ring compound is a compound in which at least some its atoms are connected to form a ring. Rings vary in size from three to many tens or even hundreds of atoms. Examples of ring compounds readily include cases where:

- all the atoms are carbon (i.e., are carbocycles),
- none of the atoms are carbon (inorganic cyclic compounds), or where
- both carbon and non-carbon atoms are present (heterocyclic compounds with rings containing both carbon and non-carbon).

Common atoms can (as a result of their valences) form varying numbers of bonds, and many common atoms readily form rings. In addition, depending on the ring size, the bond order of the individual links between ring atoms, and their arrangements within the rings, cyclic compounds may be aromatic or non-aromatic; in the case of non-aromatic cyclic compounds, they may vary from being fully saturated to having varying numbers of multiple bonds. As a consequence of the constitutional variability that is thermodynamically possible in cyclic structures, the number of possible cyclic structures, even of small size (e.g., <17 atoms) numbers in the many billions.

Moreover, the closing of atoms into rings may lock particular functional group–substituted atoms into place, resulting in stereochemistry and chirality being associated with the compound, including some manifestations that are unique to rings (e.g., configurational isomers); As well, depending on ring size, the three-dimensional shapes of particular cyclic structures — typically rings of five atoms and larger — can vary and interconvert such that conformational isomerism is displayed.

=== Carbocycles ===
The vast majority of cyclic compounds are organic, and of these, a significant and conceptually important portion are composed of rings made only of carbon atoms (i.e., they are carbocycles).

=== Inorganic cyclic compounds ===
Inorganic atoms form cyclic compounds as well. Examples include sulfur (e.g., cyclooctasulfur S_{8}), sulfur and nitrogen (e.g., trithiazyl trichloride (NSCl)_{3}), silicon (e.g., cyclopentasilane (SiH_{2})_{5}), silicon and oxygen (e.g., hexamethylcyclotrisiloxane [(CH_{3})_{2}SiO]_{3}), phosphorus and nitrogen (e.g., hexachlorophosphazene (NPCl_{2})_{3}), phosphorus and oxygen (e.g., sodium metaphosphate Na_{3}(PO_{2})_{3}), boron and oxygen (e.g., sodium metaborate Na_{3}(BO_{2})_{3}), boron and nitrogen (e.g., borazine (BN)_{3}H_{6}), nitrogen (e.g., pentazole N_{5}H). When carbon in benzene is "replaced" by other elements, e.g., as in borabenzene, silabenzene, germanabenzene, stannabenzene, and phosphorine, aromaticity is retained, and so aromatic inorganic cyclic compounds are also known and well-characterized.

=== Heterocyclic compounds ===
A heterocyclic compound is a cyclic compound that has atoms of at least two different elements as members of its ring(s). Cyclic compounds that have both carbon and non-carbon atoms present are heterocyclic carbon compounds, and the name refers to inorganic cyclic compounds as well (e.g., siloxanes, which contain only silicon and oxygen in the rings, and borazines, which contain only boron and nitrogen in the rings). Hantzsch–Widman nomenclature is recommended by the IUPAC for naming heterocycles, but many common names remain in regular use.

=== Macrocycles ===
From the perspectives of conformational freedom and reactivity, rings in carbon compounds can viewed as containing:

- 3-4 atoms, with significant ring strain, so-called small rings;
- 5-7 atoms, so-called common rings;
- 8-11 atoms, so-called medium rings; and
- 12 or more atoms, so-called large rings, or macrocycles.

(In older literature, a breakpoint for the large rings is sometimes stated as 8 or more atoms, although this is the rarer perspective in the primary literature.)

Macrocycles may be fully carbocyclic (rings containing only carbon atoms, e.g. cyclododecane), heterocyclic or hybrid (rings containing both carbon and non-carbon atoms, e.g. lactones and lactams), or purely inorganic (containing only non-carbon atoms in the rings, e.g. {Pd_{84}}^{Ac}). Heterocycles with carbon in the rings may have limited non-carbon atoms in their rings (e.g., in lactones and lactams whose rings are rich in carbon but have limited number of non-carbon atoms), or be rich in non-carbon atoms and displaying significant symmetry (e.g., in the case of chelating macrocycles).

Medium rings (8-11 atoms) are more strained than macrocycles, with between 9-13 (kcal/mol) strain energy. For instance, the chair and chair-boat of cyclooctane are more stable than its boat-boat conformation, because of the interactions depicted.

Macrocycles can access a number of stable conformations, with preference to reside in conformations that minimize transannular nonbonded interactions within the ring. Analysis of factors important in the conformations of larger macrocycles can be modeled using medium ring conformations. Conformational analysis of odd-membered rings suggests they tend to reside in less symmetrical forms with smaller energy differences between stable conformations.

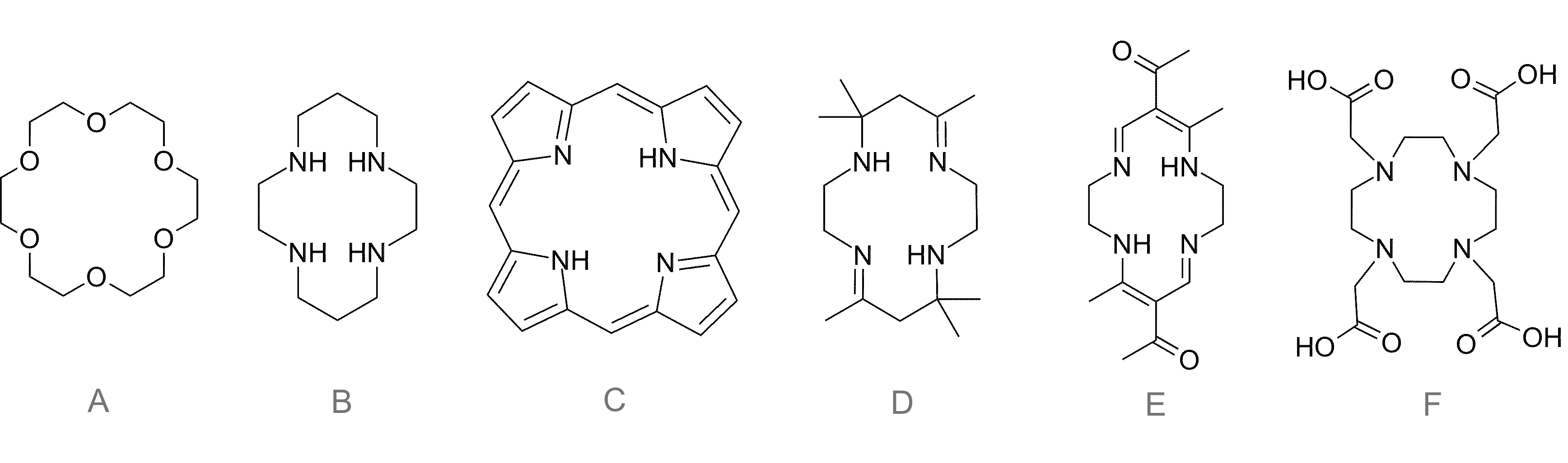
Chelating macrocyclic structures of interest in inorganic and supramolecular chemistry, an example array. A, the crown ether, 18-crown-6; B, the simple tetra-aza chelator, cyclam; C, an example porphyrin, the unsubstituted porphine; D, a mixed amine/imine, the Curtis macrocycle; E, the related enamine/imine Jäger macrocycle, and F, the tetracarboxylate-derivative DOTA macrocycle.

== Nomenclature ==
IUPAC nomenclature has extensive rules to cover the naming of cyclic structures, both as core structures, and as substituents appended to alicyclic structures. The term macrocycle is used when a ring-containing compound has a ring of 12 or more atoms. The term polycyclic is used when more than one ring appears in a single molecule. Naphthalene is formally a polycyclic compound, but is more specifically named as a bicyclic compound. Several examples of macrocyclic and polycyclic structures are given in the final gallery below.

The atoms that are part of the ring structure are called annular atoms.

== Isomerism ==
=== Stereochemistry ===
The closing of atoms into rings may lock particular atoms with distinct substitution by functional groups such that the result is stereochemistry and chirality of the compound, including some manifestations that are unique to rings (e.g., configurational isomers).

=== Conformational isomerism ===
Two conformers of cyclohexane, the chair at left, and the boat at right. Axial and equatorial hydrogen atoms are denoted with an a and e, respectively.

Depending on ring size, the three-dimensional shapes of particular cyclic structures—typically rings of 5-atoms and larger—can vary and interconvert such that conformational isomerism is displayed. Indeed, the development of this important chemical concept arose, historically, in reference to cyclic compounds. For instance, cyclohexanes—six membered carbocycles with no double bonds, to which various substituents might be attached, see image—display an equilibrium between two conformations, the chair and the boat, as shown in the image.

The chair conformation is the favored configuration, because in this conformation, the steric strain, eclipsing strain, and angle strain that are otherwise possible are minimized. Which of the possible chair conformations predominate in cyclohexanes bearing one or more substituents depends on the substituents, and where they are located on the ring; generally, "bulky" substituents—those groups with large volumes, or groups that are otherwise repulsive in their interactions—prefer to occupy an equatorial location. An example of interactions within a molecule that would lead to steric strain, leading to a shift in equilibrium from boat to chair, is the interaction between the two methyl groups in cis-1,4-dimethylcyclohexane. In this molecule, the two methyl groups are in opposing positions of the ring (1,4-), and their cis stereochemistry projects both of these groups toward the same side of the ring. Hence, if forced into the higher energy boat form, these methyl groups are in steric contact, repel one another, and drive the equilibrium toward the chair conformation.

== Principal uses ==
Because of the unique shapes, reactivities, properties, and bioactivities that they engender, cyclic compounds are the largest majority of all molecules involved in the biochemistry, structure, and function of living organisms, and in the man-made molecules (e.g., drugs, herbicides, etc.) through which man attempts to exert control over nature and biological systems.

== Synthetic reactions ==
=== Important general reactions for forming rings ===
Dieckmann ring-closing reaction

There are a variety of specialized reactions whose use is solely the formation of rings, and these will be discussed below. In addition to those, there are a wide variety of general organic reactions that historically have been crucial in the development, first, of understanding the concepts of ring chemistry, and second, of reliable procedures for preparing ring structures in high yield, and with defined orientation of ring substituents (i.e., defined stereochemistry). These general reactions include:

- Acyloin condensation;
- Anodic oxidations; and
- the Dieckmann condensation as applied to ring formation.

=== Ring-closing reactions ===
In organic chemistry, a variety of synthetic procedures are particularly useful in closing carbocyclic and other rings; these are termed ring-closing reactions. Examples include:

- alkyne trimerisation;
- the Bergman cyclization of an enediyne;
- the Diels–Alder, between a conjugated diene and a substituted alkene, and other cycloaddition reactions;
- the Nazarov cyclization reaction, originally being the cyclization of a divinyl ketone;
- various radical cyclizations;
- ring-closing metathesis reactions, which also can be used to accomplish a specific type of polymerization;
- the Ruzicka large ring synthesis, in which two carboxyl groups combine to form a carbonyl group with loss of CO_{2} and H_{2}O;
- the Wenker synthesis converting a beta amino alcohol to an aziridine

=== Ring-opening reactions ===
A variety of further synthetic procedures are particularly useful in opening carbocyclic and other rings, generally which contain a double bond or other functional group "handle" to facilitate chemistry; these are termed ring-opening reactions. Examples include:

- ring opening metathesis, which can also be used to accomplish a specific type of polymerization.

=== Ring expansion and ring contraction reactions ===
Ring expansion and contraction reactions are common in organic synthesis, and are frequently encountered in pericyclic reactions. Ring expansions and contractions can involve the insertion of a functional group such as the case with Baeyer–Villiger oxidation of cyclic ketones, rearrangements of cyclic carbocycles as seen in intramolecular Diels-Alder reactions, or collapse or rearrangement of bicyclic compounds as several examples.

== Examples ==
=== Simple, mono-cyclic examples ===
The following are examples of simple and aromatic carbocycles, inorganic cyclic compounds, and heterocycles:

Simple mono-cyclic compounds: Carbocyclic, inorganic and heterocyclic (aromatic and non-aromatic) examples

Benzene, a 6-membered carbocyclic organic compound, methine hydrogens shown, and 6 electrons shown as delocalized through drawing of circle (aromatic).

Cyclooctane, an 8-membered carbocyclic organic compound, methylene hydrogens implied, not shown (non-aromatic).

Cyclooctasulfur, an 8-membered inorganic cyclic compound (non-aromatic).

Trithiazyl trichloride, a 6-membered inorganic heterocyclic compound (non-aromatic).

Cyclopentasilane, a 5-membered inorganic cyclic compound (non-aromatic).

Hexamethylcyclotrisiloxane, a 6-membered organic heterocyclic compound (non-aromatic).

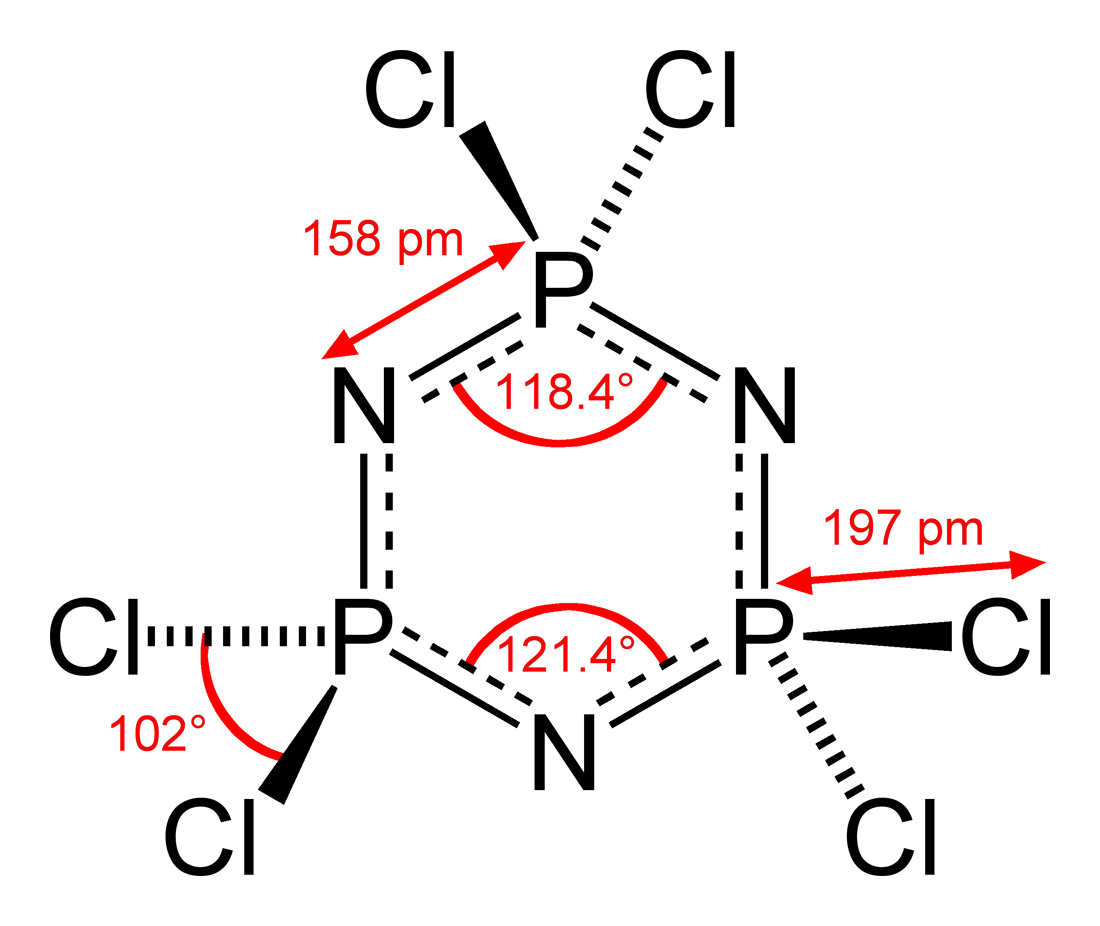
Hexachlorophosphazene, a 6-membered inorganic heterocyclic compound (aromatic).

Borazine, a 6-membered inorganic heterocyclic compound (may be aromatic).

Pentazole, a 5-membered inorganic cyclic compound (aromatic).

Pyrrole, a 5-membered heterocyclic organic compound, methine hydrogen atoms implied, not shown (aromatic).

Pyridine, a 6 membered heterocyclic organic compound, methine hydrogen atoms implied, not shown, and delocalized π-electrons shown as discrete bonds (aromatic).

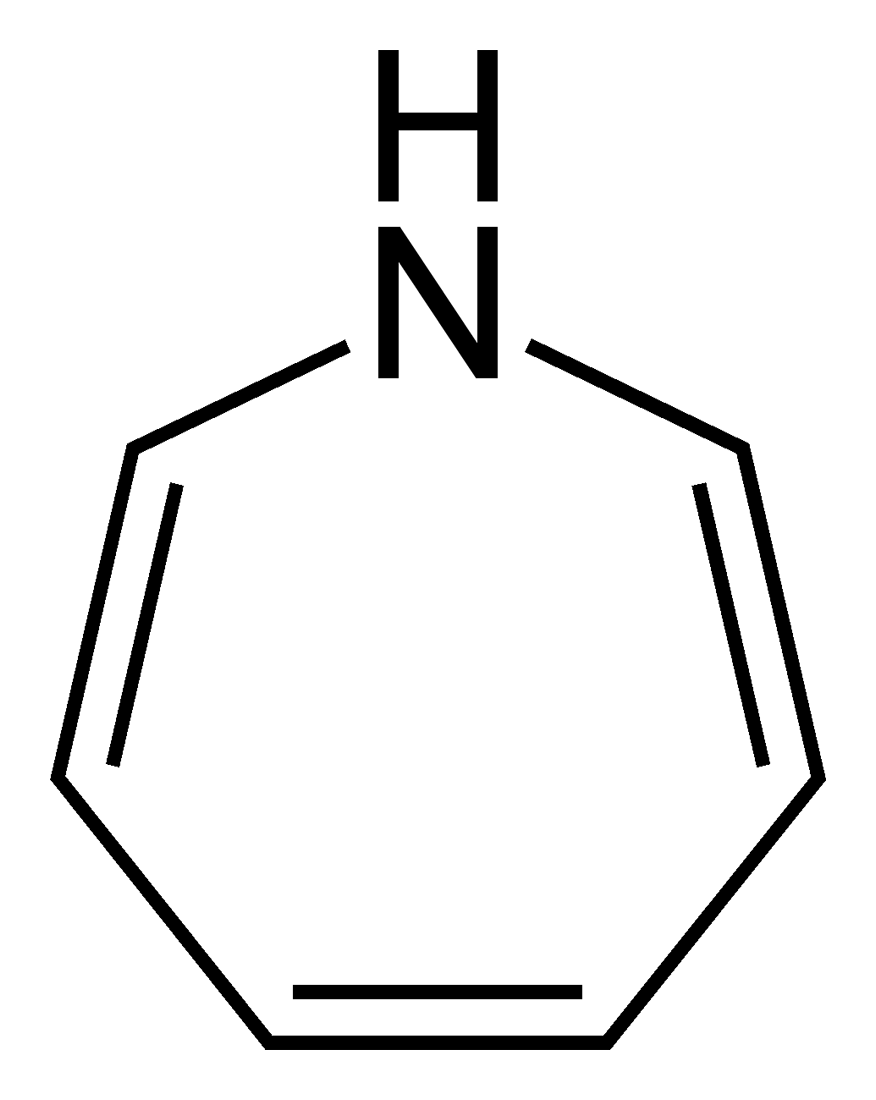
Azepine, a 7-membered heterocyclic organic compound (non-aromatic).

=== Complex and polycyclic examples ===
The following are examples of cyclic compounds exhibiting more complex ring systems and stereochemical features:

Complex cyclic compounds: Macrocyclic and polycyclic examples

Naphthalene, technically a polycyclic, more specifically a bicyclic compound, with circles showing delocalization of π-electrons (aromatic).

Decalin (decahydronaphthalene), the fully saturated derivative of naphthalene, showing the two stereochemistries possible for "fusing" the two rings together, and how this impacts the shapes available to this bicyclic compound (non-aromatic).

Longifolene, a polycyclic terpene natural product, and an example of a tricyclic molecule (non-aromatic).

Ingenol, a polycyclic terpene natural product with a tetracyclic core: with a 3- and a 5-membered carbocyclic rings, fused to two further 7-membered carbocyclic rings (non-aromatic).

Paclitaxel, a polycyclic natural product with a tetracyclic core: with a heterocyclic, 4-membered D ring, fused to further 6- and 8-membered carbocyclic (A/C and B) rings (non-aromatic), and with three further pendant phenyl-rings on its "tail", and attached to C-2 (abbrev. Ph, C_{6}H_{5}; aromatics).

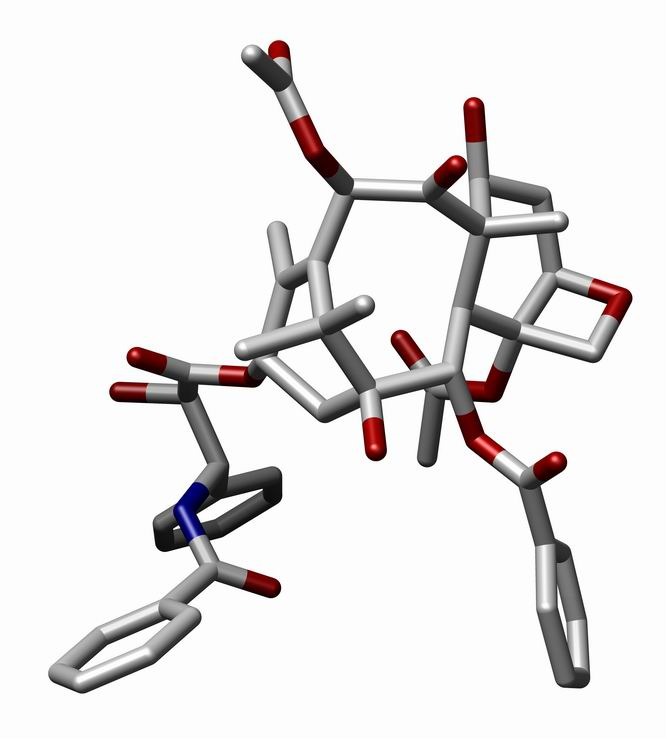
A representative three-dimensional shape adopted by paclitaxel, as a result of its unique cyclic structure.

Cholesterol, another polycyclic terpene natural product, in particular, a steroid, a class of tetracyclic molecules (non-aromatic).

Benzo[a]pyrene, a pentacyclic compound both natural and man-made, and delocalized π-electrons shown as discrete bonds (aromatic).

Pagodane, a complex, highly symmetric, man-made polycyclic compound (non-aromatic).

== See also ==
- Lactone
- Open-chain compound
- Effective molarity
