= Pyrylium =

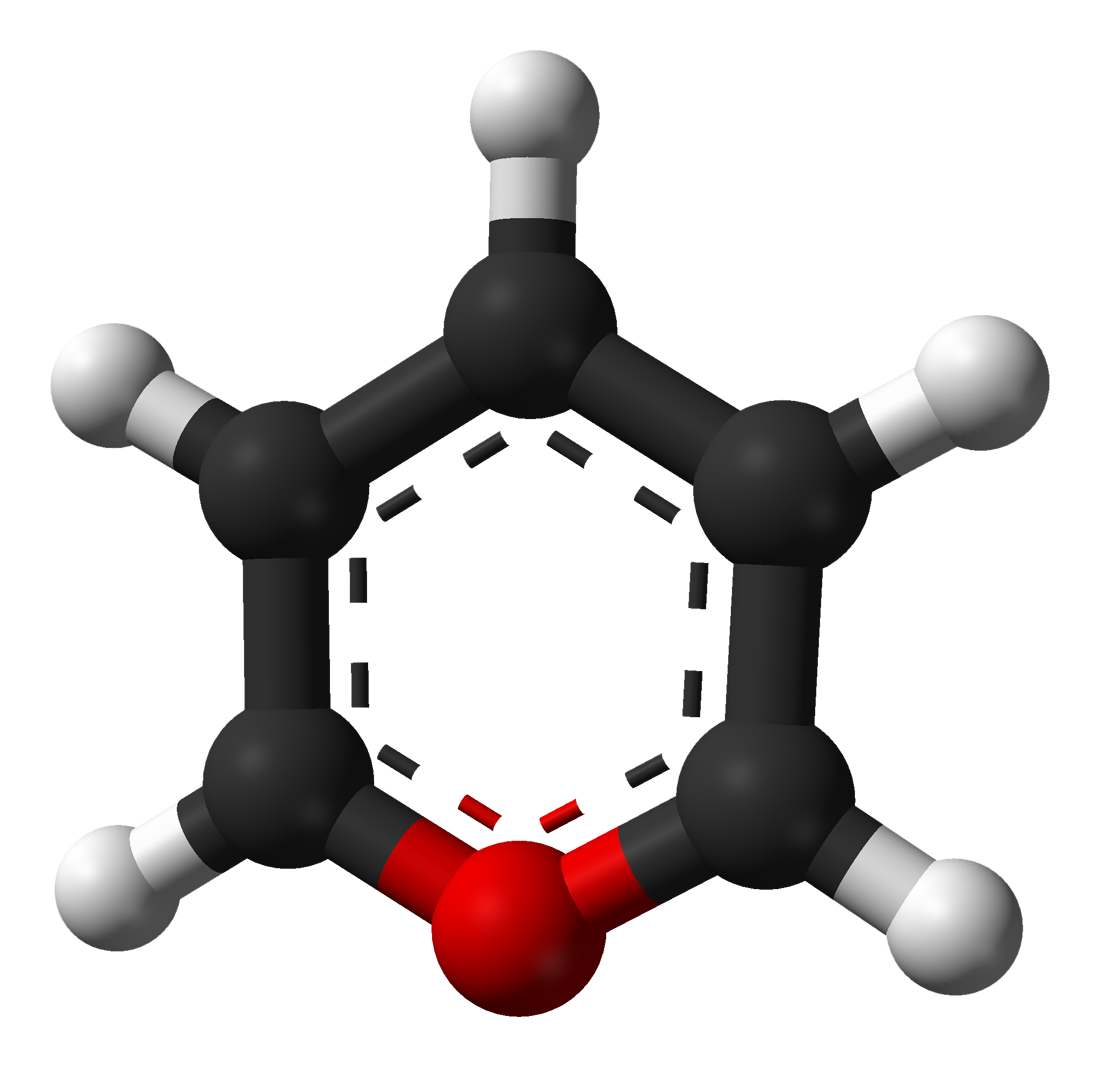

Names
- Preferred IUPAC name Pyrylium
- Other names Pyranium

Identifiers
CAS Number	289-67-8
3D model (JSmol)	Interactive image
Beilstein Reference	1421881
ChEBI	CHEBI:36120; salt: CHEBI:59658; family: CHEBI:59657
ChemSpider	7827742
Gmelin Reference	558560
PubChem CID	9548819
CompTox Dashboard (EPA)	DTXSID40429539
- InChI: InChI=1S/C5H5O/c1-2-4-6-5-3-1/h1-5H/q+1 Key: WVIICGIFSIBFOG-UHFFFAOYSA-N; InChI=1/C5H5O/c1-2-4-6-5-3-1/h1-5H/q+1 Key: WVIICGIFSIBFOG-UHFFFAOYAF
- SMILES: [o+]1ccccc1

Properties
Chemical formula	C_{5}H_{5}O^{+}
Molar mass	81.093 g·mol^{−1}

Related compounds
Related compounds	thiopyrylium, selenopyrylium, telluropyrylium
- Except where otherwise noted, data are given for materials in their standard state (at 25 °C [77 °F], 100 kPa). verify (what is ?) Infobox references

Pyrylium is a cation (positive ion) with formula C_{5}H_{5}O^{+}, consisting of a six-membered ring of five carbon atoms, each with one hydrogen atom, and one positively charged oxygen atom. The bonds in the ring are conjugated as in benzene, giving it an aromatic character. In particular, because of the positive charge, the oxygen atom is trivalent. Pyrilium is a mono-cyclic and heterocyclic compound, one of the oxonium ions.

== Synthesis ==
Pyrylium salts are easily produced from simple starting materials through a condensation reaction.

Pyrylium salts with aromatic substituents, such 2,4,6-triphenylpyrylium tetrafluoroborate, can be obtained from two moles of acetophenone, one mole of benzaldehyde, and excess tetrafluoroboric acid. For pyrylium salts with alkyl substituents, such as 2,4,6-trimethylpyrylium salts, the best method uses the Balaban-Nenitzescu-Praill synthesis from tertiary butanol and acetic anhydride in the presence of tetrafluoroboric, perchloric, or trifluoromethanesulfonic acids.

Hydroxide bases open and hydrolyze pyridine to an enedione base that cyclizes in very strong acids to a pyrylium cation.

Enolizing conditions (strong acid) force pyrones to their pyrylium tautomer.

== Chemical properties ==
Pyrylium and its derivatives form stable salts with a variety of anions.

Like other oxonium ions, pyrylium is unstable in neutral water. However, pyrylium is much less reactive than ordinary oxonium ions because of aromatic stabilization. The highly electronegative oxygen strongly perturbs the orbitals in the aromatic ring, and pyrylium derivatives are extremely resistant to electrophilic aromatic substitution. Pyrylium cations react with nucleophiles at the ortho and para positions, typically through ANRORC.

2,4,6-Triphenylpyrylium salts are converted by hydroxide bases into a stable 1,5-enedione (pseudobase), but 2,4,6-trimethylpyrylium salts on treatment with hot alkali hydroxides afford an unstable pseudobase that undergoes an intramolecular condensation yielding 3,5-dimethylphenol. In warm deuterium oxide, 2,4,6-trimethylpyrylium salts undergo isotopic exchange of 4-methyl hydrogens faster than for the 2- and 6-methyl groups, allowing the synthesis of regioselectively deuterated compounds.

== Derivatives ==
Pyrylium's electrophilicity makes them useful materials for producing other compounds with stronger aromatic character. Pyrylium salts afford pyridines with ammonia, pyridinium salts with primary amines, pyridine-N-oxides with hydroxylamine, phosphabenzenes with phosphine derivatives, thiopyrylium salts with hydrogen sulfide, and benzene derivatives with acetonitrile or nitromethane.

Many important cations are formally derived from pyrylium by substitution of various functional groups for some or all the hydrogens in the ring. 2,4,6-Triphenylpyrylium reacts with primary amines to give pyridinium derivatives called "Katritzky salts"; they are commonly used in metal-catalyzed nucleophilic displacement of the amine.

=== Pyrones ===
A pyrylium cation with a hydroxyl anion substituent in the 2-position is not the zwitterionic aromatic compound (1), but the neutral unsaturated lactone 2-pyrone or pyran-2-one (2). Important representatives of this class are the coumarins. Likewise a 4-hydroxyl pyrylium compound is a γ-pyrone or pyran-4-one (4), to which group belong compounds such as maltol.

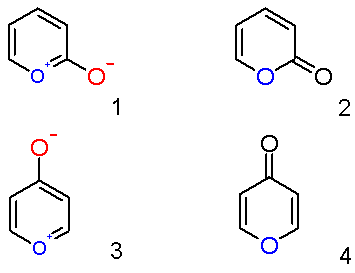
pyrones

2-Pyrones are known to react with alkynes in a Diels–Alder reaction to form arene compounds with expulsion of carbon dioxide. For example:

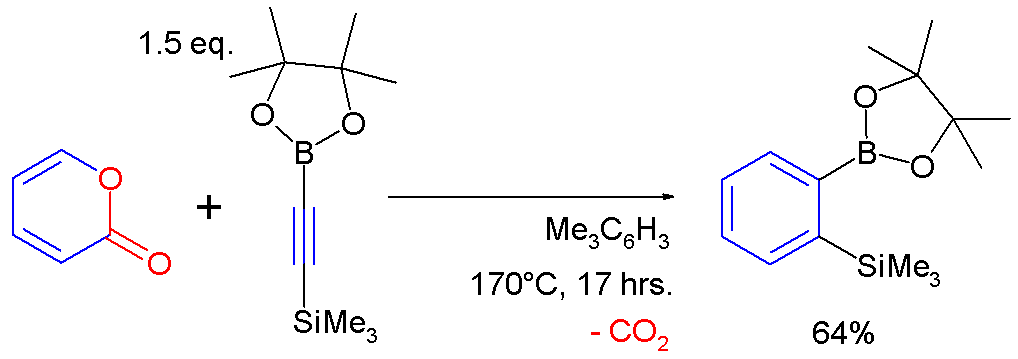
Pyrone cycloaddition

3-pyrones are too unstable for isolation, but appear as reaction intermediates.

=== Polycyclic oxonium arenes ===
==== Chromenylium ion ====
One bicyclic pyrylium ion is called benzopyrylium ion (IUPAC: chromenylium ion) (formula: C_{9}H_{7}O^{+}, molar mass: 131.15 g/mol, exact mass: 131.04968983). It can be seen as a charged derivative of 2H-1-benzopyran (IUPAC: 2H-chromene, C_{9}H_{8}O), or a (charged) substituted heterocyclic derivative of naphthalene (C_{10}H_{8}).

===== Flavylium ion =====
In biology, the 2-phenylbenzopyrylium (2-phenylchromenylium) ion is referred to as flavylium. A class of flavylium-derived compounds are anthocyanidins and anthocyanins, pigments that are responsible for the colors of many flowers.

==== Naphthoxanthenium cation ====
Higher polycyclic derivatives of pyrylium also exist. One good example is naphthoxanthenium. This dye is highly stable, aromatic, and planar. It absorbs in the UV and blue region and presents exceptional photophysical properties. It can be synthesized by chemical or photochemical reactions.

Benzopyrylium chloride (chromenylium chloride), a salt with chloride as the counterion

Flavylium cation

Naphthoxanthenium cation

== See also ==
- 6-membered aromatic rings with one carbon replaced by another group: borabenzene, silabenzene, germabenzene, stannabenzene, pyridine, phosphorine, arsabenzene, stibabenzene, bismabenzene, thiopyrylium, selenopyrylium, telluropyrylium
- Pyran, C_{5}H_{6}O (pyrones lacking the ketone group)
