= Borabenzene adducts =

Borabenzene

Names
- Preferred IUPAC name Borinine

Identifiers
CAS Number	31029-61-5
3D model (JSmol)	Interactive image
ChemSpider	9074474
PubChem CID	10899214
CompTox Dashboard (EPA)	DTXSID50447608
- InChI: InChI=1S/C5H5B/c1-2-4-6-5-3-1/h1-5H Key: HXNZTJULPKRNPR-UHFFFAOYSA-N
- SMILES: B1=CC=CC=C1

Properties
Chemical formula	C_{5}H_{5}B
Molar mass	75.91 g·mol^{−1}
- Except where otherwise noted, data are given for materials in their standard state (at 25 °C [77 °F], 100 kPa). Infobox references

Borabenzene is a hypothetical organoboron compound with the formula C_{5}H_{5}B. Relative to the related but highly stable benzene molecule, borabenzene has two fewer electrons; by Hückel's rule, it would be anti-aromatic.

Adducts of borabenzene with Lewis bases are aromatic and indirectly isolable. A particularly large family are derived from the boratabenzene anion, [C_{5}H_{5}BH]^{−}.

== Synthesis ==
Since borabenzene is unavailable, 4‑silyl-1‑methoxyboracyclohexadiene or similar boracyclohexadienes (derived from dibutylstannacyclohexadiene, itself from double hydrostannylation of 1,4-pentadiyne) are used as a borabenzene equivalent, e.g.:

C_{5}H_{5}N + MeOBC_{5}H_{5}SiMe_{3} → C_{5}H_{5}N-BC_{5}H_{5} + MeOSiMe_{3}

Possible Lewis bases for the reaction (besides pyridine) include tertiary amines and phosphines, phosphole anions, isonitriles and cyanide anion, bis(IMes)platinum, and (under heat) certain metal carbonyls.

Alternatively, piperyleneboramides and -borate esters cyclize in base (e.g., lithium diethylamide).

Boratabenzene ligands form through (reversible) ring-expansion-oxidation of certain 19-electron cyclopentadienide complexes, and can then be released from the metal through either ligand exchange with cyanide or alkali metal reduction.

In rare cases, dihydroborepins rearrange and deprotonate to borabenzenes; likewise hydride reduction of a pentagonal pyramidal boracation also rearranges to a borabenzene.

As of 2019, there were no known syntheses of uncomplexed borabenzene. Boracyclohexadiene flash vacuum pyrolysis only proceeded under a nitrogen atmosphere to give a borabenzene-dinitrogen complex.

== Neutral adducts ==
Adducts of borabenzene with pyridine and triphenylphosphine.

Adducts of the form BC_{5}H_{6}−L react with many nucleophiles, exchanging out the L moiety in a nucleophilic aromatic substitution addition-elimination. These reactions are generally catalyzed by minute quantities of Lewis acid; thus for example the pyridine adduct is tightly bound in free pyridine: no exchange is observed even at elevated temperatures.

The pyridine adduct C_{5}H_{5}N-BC_{5}H_{5} is structurally related to biphenyl. It is a yellow whereas biphenyl is colorless, indicating distinct electronic structures.

Adducts with amines generally have a B-N π bond; adducts with phosphines do not. Nevertheless, both behave like a diene in Diels-Alder reactions:

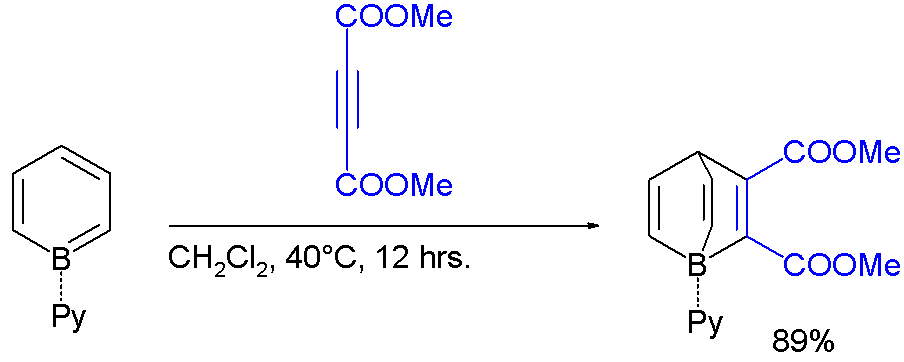

== Boratabenzenes ==
Boratabenzene
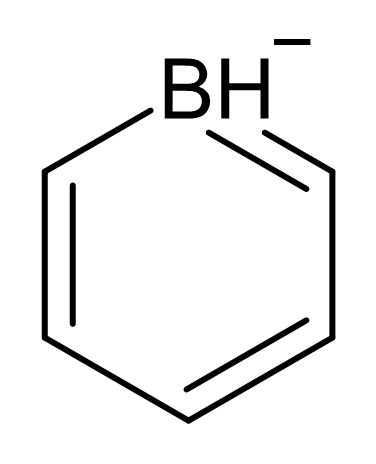

Names
- IUPAC name Boranuidabenzene

Identifiers
CAS Number	55926-39-1
3D model (JSmol)	Interactive image
PubChem CID	15206882
CompTox Dashboard (EPA)	DTXSID50447608
- InChI: InChI=1S/C5H6B/c1-2-4-6-5-3-1/h1-6H/q-1 Key: JFCOHHLERXSTLY-UHFFFAOYSA-N
- SMILES: [BH-]1=CC=CC=C1

Properties
Chemical formula	C_{5}H_{6}B^{−}
Molar mass	76.91 g·mol^{−1}
- Except where otherwise noted, data are given for materials in their standard state (at 25 °C [77 °F], 100 kPa). Infobox references

Boratabenzene, sometimes called borinate, is the heteroaromatic anion with the formula [C_{5}H_{5}BH]^{−}. Derivatives of boratabenzene often replace the adduced hydride with a (formal) organyl or alkoxide anion. They have some use as spectator ligands in olefin polymerization catalysts.

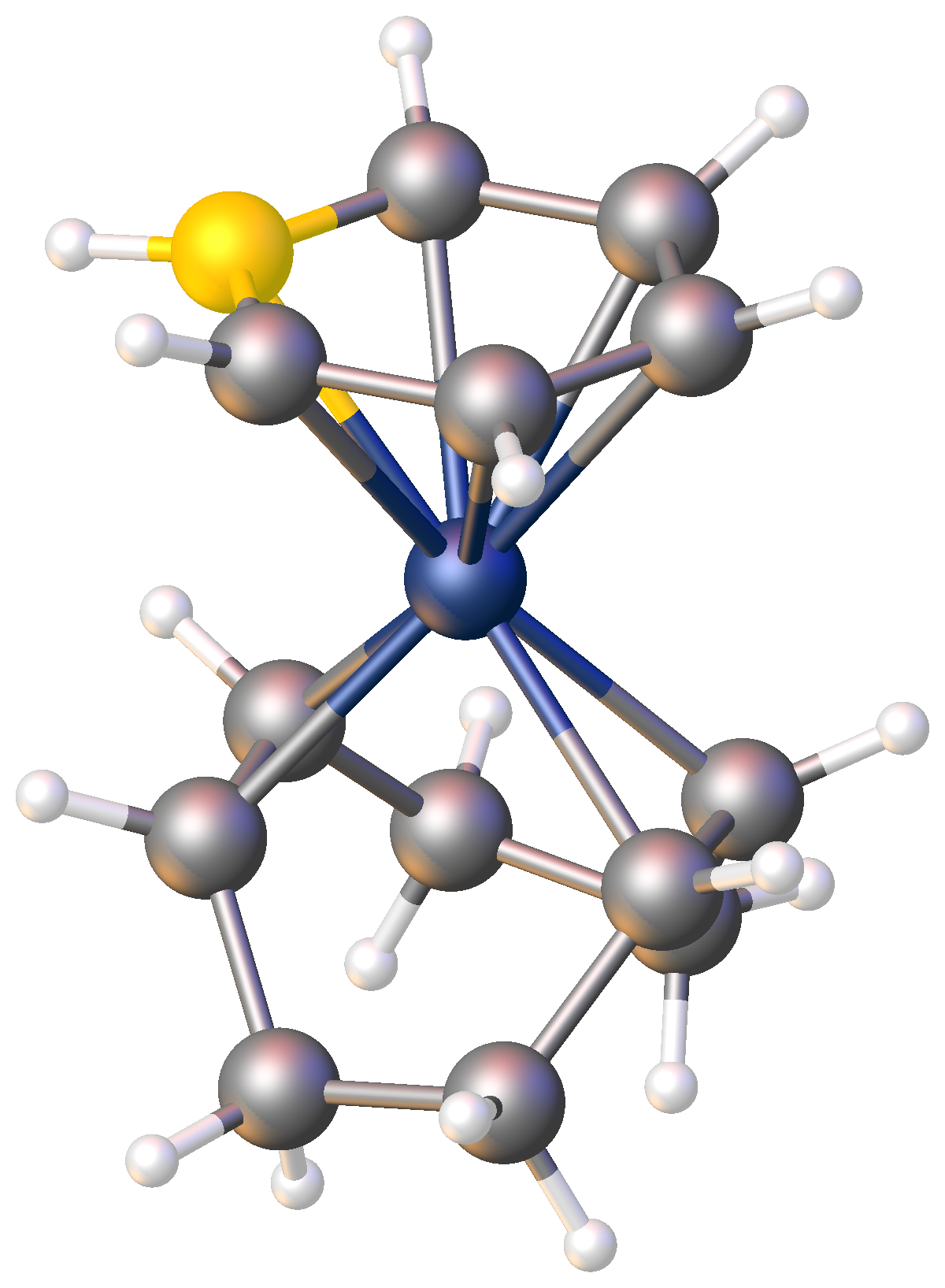
Structure of Rh(C_{8}H_{12})(η^{6}-C_{5}H_{5}BH).

Sandwich or half-sandwich type complexes with many transition metals have been reported; indeed, the first known instance of a borabenzene adduct was Cyclopentadienylcobalt 1-phenylboratabenzene, derived from cobaltocene and phenylboron dichloride.

Facially coordinated, these species are 6-electron ligands, weaker donors and stronger acceptors than cyclopentadiene. The metal is typically shifted away from boron in the ring, and it appears that any exocyclic π bond to B delocalizes into a metal-B antibond. Indeed, in ZrCl_{2}(C_{5}H_{5}B−NiPr_{2})_{2}, the Zr is approximately η^{5}-coordinated (the -OEt analogue returns to η^{6}).

The boron-coordinated hydrogen in the parent ligand ((CH)_{5}BH^{−}) is rather hydridic, and the B−H bond can perform hydroboration.

When coordinated to a metal center, boratabenzenes can exchange boron substituents through nucleophilic substitution. In electrophilic aromatic substitution reactions, carbons 2 and 6 (ortho to boron) react first, with carbon 4 (resp. para) reacting later.

The 1-methyl and 1-phenyl borinates can form some of the few organo-thallium(I) compounds.

== See also ==
- 6-membered aromatic rings with one carbon replaced by another element: silabenzene, germabenzene, stannabenzene, pyridine, phosphorine, arsabenzene, stibabenzene, bismabenzene, pyrylium, thiopyrylium, selenopyrylium, telluropyrylium
- Borazine
- Hexachloroborazine
