= Telluropyrylium =

Names
- Preferred IUPAC name Telluropyrylium
- Other names Tellurinium; Tellurapyrylium

Identifiers
CAS Number	84030-84-2
3D model (JSmol)	Interactive image
ChemSpider	26667642
- InChI: InChI=1S/C5H5Te/c1-2-4-6-5-3-1/h1-5H/q+1 Key: MAFRBFVUOYFWCN-UHFFFAOYSA-N
- SMILES: C1=CC=[Te+]C=C1

Properties
Chemical formula	C_{5}H_{5}Te^{+}
Molar mass	192.69 g·mol^{−1}
- Except where otherwise noted, data are given for materials in their standard state (at 25 °C [77 °F], 100 kPa). Infobox references

Telluropyrylium is an aromatic heterocyclic compound consisting of a six member ring with five carbon atoms, and a positively charged tellurium atom. Derivatives of telluropyrylium are important in research of infrared dyes.

== Naming and numbering ==
Formerly it was named tellurapyrylium. However this is misleading, as "tellura" indicates that tellurium substitutes for carbon atom, but actually tellurium is substituted for the oxygen atom in pyrilium. In the Hantzsch-Widman system it is called tellurinium. This is the name used by Chemical Abstracts. Replacement nomenclature would call this telluroniabenzene.

Numbering in telluropyrylium starts with 1 on the tellurium atom and counts up to 6 counter-clockwise on the carbon atoms. The positions adjacent to the chalcogen, numbered 2 and 6 can also be called α, the next two positions 3 and 5 can be termed "β" and the opposite carbon at position 4 can be called "γ".

== Occurrence ==
Because telluropyrylium is a positively charged cation, it takes the solid form as a salt with non-nucleophillic anions like perchlorate, tetrafluoroborate, or hexafluorophosphate.

== Properties ==
The positive charge is not confined to the tellurium atom in telluropyrylium, but distributes on the ring in several resonance structures, so that the α and γ positions have some positive charge. A nucleophillic attack targets these carbon atoms.

The shape of the telluropyrylium molecule is not a perfect hexagon, as the bond lengths to the tellurium atom at about 2.068 Å compared to about 1.4 Å for the carbon-carbon bonds. The angle at the tellurium atom is also reduced to about 94°, angles at the α and γ carbon atoms in the ring are about 122° and at the β positions 129°. The whole ring is bent so that it forms a boat shape with an angles of 8.7° on the Te-γ axis. (This was measured in the crystal structure of tetraphenyl telluropyrylium-pyrylium monomethine fluoroborate.

== Related ==
When the ring of telluropyrylium is fused with other aromatic rings larger aromatic structures such as tellurochromenylium, telluroflavylium, and telluroxanthylium result.

== See also ==
- 6-membered aromatic rings with one carbon replaced by another group: borabenzene, silabenzene, germabenzene, stannabenzene, pyridine, phosphorine, arsabenzene, stibabenzene, bismabenzene, pyrylium, thiopyrylium, selenopyrylium

== Extra reading ==
- Detty, Michael R.; Murray, Bruce J. (December 1982). "Telluropyrylium dyes. 1. 2,6-Diphenyltelluropyrylium dyes". The Journal of Organic Chemistry. 47 (27): 5235–5239. doi:10.1021/jo00148a001.
