= Selenopyrylium =

Names
- Preferred IUPAC name Selenopyrylium
- Other names Selenopyranium, Selenopyran-1-ium

Identifiers
CAS Number	407-84-1
3D model (JSmol)	Interactive image
ChemSpider	10431325
PubChem CID	18651325
CompTox Dashboard (EPA)	DTXSID50595370
- InChI: InChI=1S/C5H5Se/c1-2-4-6-5-3-1/h1-5H/q+1 Key: GSMVXZUBBCEROW-UHFFFAOYSA-N
- SMILES: C1=CC=[Se+]C=C1

Properties
Chemical formula	C_{5}H_{5}Se^{+}
Molar mass	144.065 g·mol^{−1}
- Except where otherwise noted, data are given for materials in their standard state (at 25 °C [77 °F], 100 kPa). Infobox references

Selenopyrylium is an aromatic heterocyclic compound consisting of a six-membered ring with five carbon atoms and a positively charged selenium atom.

== Naming and numbering ==
Formerly it was named selenapyrylium. However, this is misleading as "selena" indicates that selenium substitutes for a carbon atom, but actually selenium is substituted for the oxygen atom in pyrylium. In the Hantzsch-Widman system of nomenclature, it is called seleninium. This is the name used by Chemical Abstracts. Replacement nomenclature would call this selenoniabenzene.

Numbering in selenopyrylium starts with 1 on the selenium atom and counts up to 6 on the carbon atoms. The positions adjacent to the chalcogen, numbered 2 and 6 can also be called α, the next two positions 3 and 5 can be termed "β" and the opposite carbon at position 4 can be called "γ".

== Occurrence ==
Because selenopyrylium is a positively charged ion, it takes the solid form as a salt with non-nucleophillic anions such as perchlorate, tetrafluoroborate, fluorosulfate, and hexafluorophosphate.

== Formation ==
Selenopyrylium and derivatives can be made from 1,5-diketones (such as glutaraldehyde) and hydrogen selenide, along with hydrogen chloride (HCl) as a catalyst using acetic acid as a solvent. A side product is 2,6-bis-(hydroseleno)selenacyclohexane.

When 5-chloro-2,4-pentadienenitrile derivatives react with sodium hydroselenide, or sodium selenite, and are then treated with perchloric acid, a 2-amino-selenopyrilium perchlorate salt results.

== Properties ==
The positive charge is not confined to the selenium atom, but distributes on the ring in several resonance structures, so that the α and γ positions have some positive charge. A nucleophillic attack targets these carbon atoms.

Selenopyrylium has two prominent absorption bands in the ultraviolet spectrum, band I is at 3000 Å, and band II is at 2670 Å. Band I, also known as ^{1}L_{b} is from the ^{1}B_{1}←^{1}A_{1} transition. The wavelength is longer and the band is much stronger than that of benzene. This is a bathochromic shift. The wavelength is longer than in thiopyrylium and pyrylium, but the intensity is weaker, due to selenium being less electronegative. Band II, also called ^{1}L_{a}, is stronger and longer than that of benzene, thiopyrylium and pyrylium. Band II is polarized in the direction of Se-γ axis.

The nuclear magnetic resonance spectrum shows a 10.98 ppm shift for H2 and 6, 8.77 for H3 and H5 and 9.03 for H4 (BF_{4}^{−} salt dissolved in CD_{3}CN). Compared to other pyryliums H2,6 is more than that of oxygen or sulfur, H3,5 is between that of oxygen and sulfur, and H4 is very similar to thiopyrylium, but is slightly lower. NMR for ^{13}C has the same trends as for the attached hydrogens.

Solvents include trifluoroacetic acid, methanol, dichloromethane, chloroform, and acetonitrile.

== Derivatives ==
Many derivatives of selenopyrylium are known with side chains attached to carbons 2, 3, or 6. Examples include 4-(p-dimethylaminophenyl)selenopyridinium, 2,6-diphenylselenopyridinium, 4-methyl-2,6-diphenylselenopyrylium, 2,4,6-triphenylselenopyrylium, 2,6-diphenyl-4-(p-dimethylaminophenyl)selenopyrylium, and 2,6-di-tert-butylselenopyrylium.

== Related ==
When the ring is fused with other aromatic rings, larger aromatic structures such as selenochromenylium, selenoflavylium, and selenoxanthylium result.

== See also ==
- 6-membered aromatic rings with one carbon replaced by another group: borabenzene, silabenzene, germabenzene, stannabenzene, pyridine, phosphorine, arsabenzene, stibabenzene, bismabenzene, pyrylium, thiopyrylium, selenopyrylium, telluropyrylium
