= Arsabenzene =

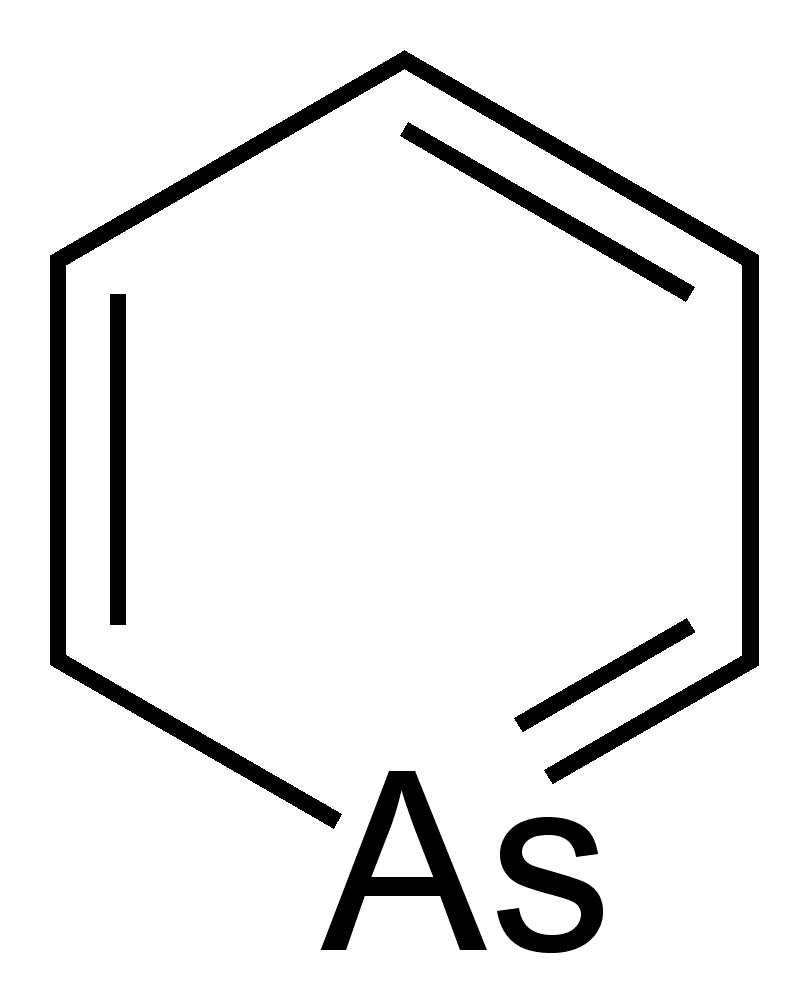
- Structural formula of arsabenzene

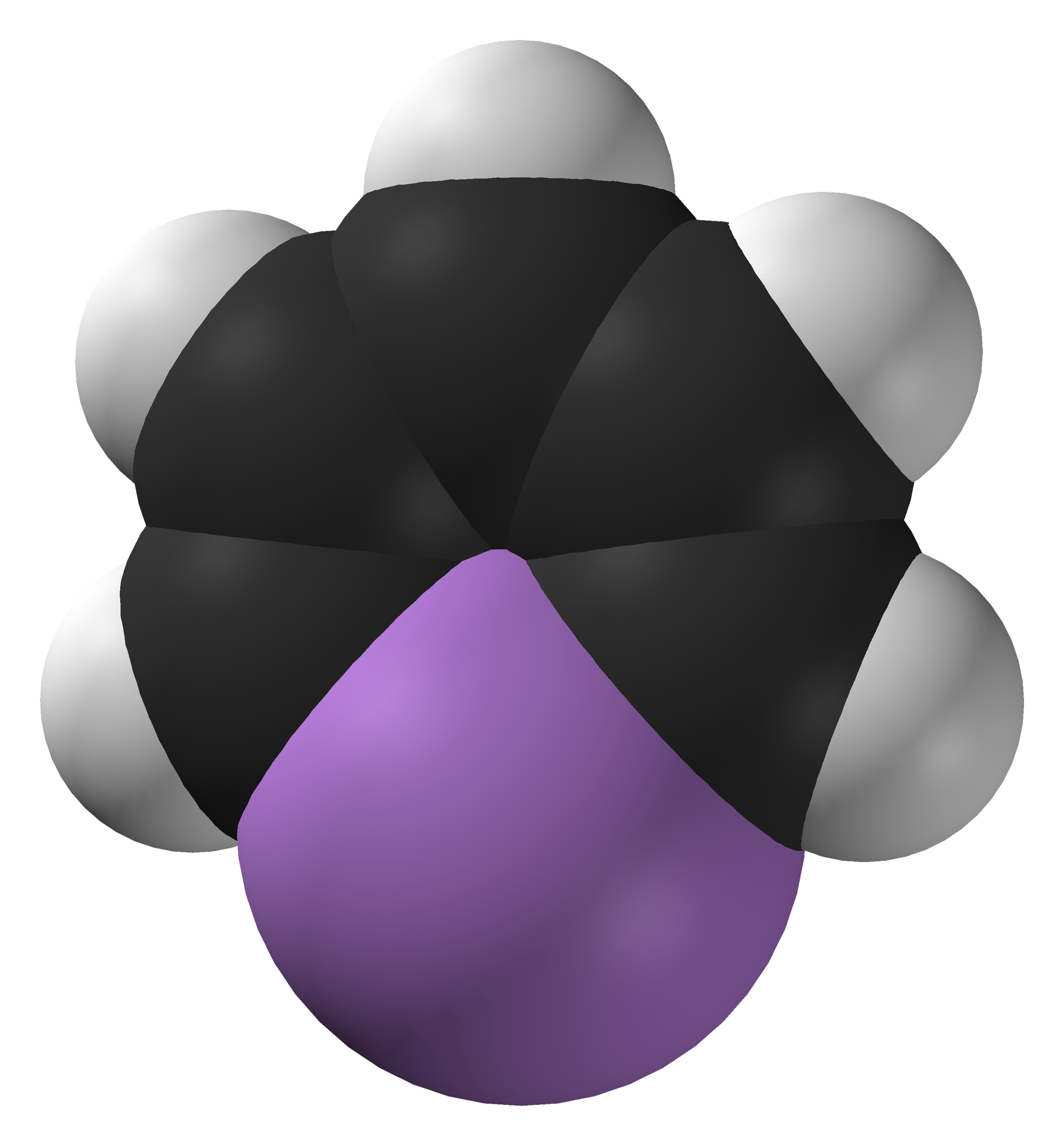
- Space-filling model of arsabenzene

Names
- Preferred IUPAC name Arsinine
- Systematic IUPAC name Arsinine
- Other names Arsabenzene

Identifiers
CAS Number	289-31-6
3D model (JSmol)	Interactive image
ChemSpider	119909
PubChem CID	136132
CompTox Dashboard (EPA)	DTXSID90183093
- InChI: InChI=1S/C5H5As/c1-2-4-6-5-3-1/h1-5H Key: XRFXFAVKXJREHL-UHFFFAOYSA-N; InChI=1/C5H5As/c1-2-4-6-5-3-1/h1-5H Key: XRFXFAVKXJREHL-UHFFFAOYAM
- SMILES: C1=CC=[As]C=C1

Properties
Chemical formula	C_{5}H_{5}As
Molar mass	140.017 g·mol^{−1}
Appearance	Colourless gas
Odor	Onion like
Melting point	−54 °C (−65 °F; 219 K)
Boiling point	−54 to 25 °C (−65 to 77 °F; 219 to 298 K)

Structure
Molecular shape	planar
- Except where otherwise noted, data are given for materials in their standard state (at 25 °C [77 °F], 100 kPa). verify (what is ?) Infobox references

Arsabenzene (IUPAC name: arsinine) is an organoarsenic heterocyclic compound with the chemical formula C_{5}H_{5}As. It belongs to a group of compounds called heteroarenes that have the general formula C_{5}H_{5}E (E= N, P, As, Sb, Bi).

This air sensitive liquid has an onion odor, and it decomposes on heating. Arsabenzene is also an ambidentate ligand that prefers to coordinate using η^{1}(As)- or η^{6}(π)-routes.

The study of arsabenzene and related compounds was an important step in the understanding of compounds that contain multiple bonds between carbon and heavier elements.

The study of heteroarenes was begun by Märkl, with the synthesis of 2,4,6-triphenylphosphabenzene. This is achieved by treating 2,4,6-trisubstituted pyrylium salt with phosphanes. The first derivative of arsabenzene was 9-arsaanthracene prepared by Jutzi and Bickelhaupt.

== Structure ==
Arsabenzene is planar. The C—C bond distances of 1.39 Å, the As—C bond has a length of 1.85 Å, this is 6.6% shorter than the normal As—C single bond.

Bond lengths and angles of benzene, pyridine, phosphorine, arsabenzene, stibabenzene, and bismabenzene

NMR spectroscopy carried out on arsabenzene indicates that it has a diamagnetic ring current.

== Synthesis ==
Arsabenzene is synthesized in a two step process from 1,4-pentadiyne. The diyne reacts with dibutylstannane to give 1,1-dibutylstannacyclohexa-2,5-diene. The organotin compound undergoes As/Sn exchange with arsenic trichloride to give 1-chloroacyclohexadiene, which loses a HCl upon heating, forming the arsabenzene.

CH_{2}(CHCH)_{2}SnBu_{2} + AsCl_{3} → CH_{2}(CHCH)_{2}AsCl + Bu_{2}SnCl_{2}

CH_{2}(CHCH)_{2}AsCl → C_{5}H_{5}As + HCl

== Reactions ==
Arsabenzene undergoes electrophilic aromatic substitution at its ortho and para positions. It also undergoes Friedel-Crafts acylation.

Whereas pyridine does not normally undergo a Diels–Alder reaction, arsabenzene behaves as a diene with hexafluoro-2-butyne. The corresponding phosphorine and benzene undergo the analogous reaction at 100 °C and 200 °C, respectively. Thus the ability of these heterobenzenes to undergo the Diels Alder reaction with this electrophile increases down the periodic table. Bismabenzene is so reactive that it exists in equilibrium with its dimer.

Arsabenzene is far less basic than pyridine, being unreactive with Lewis acids. Trifluoroacetic acid does not protonate the molecule.

== See also ==
- 6-membered aromatic rings with one carbon replaced by another group:borabenzene, silabenzene, germabenzene, stannabenzene, pyridine, phosphorine, arsabenzene, stibabenzene, bismabenzene, pyrylium, thiopyrylium, selenopyrylium, telluropyrylium
- Benzene
