= Phosphorine =

Kekulé skeletal formula of phosphorine
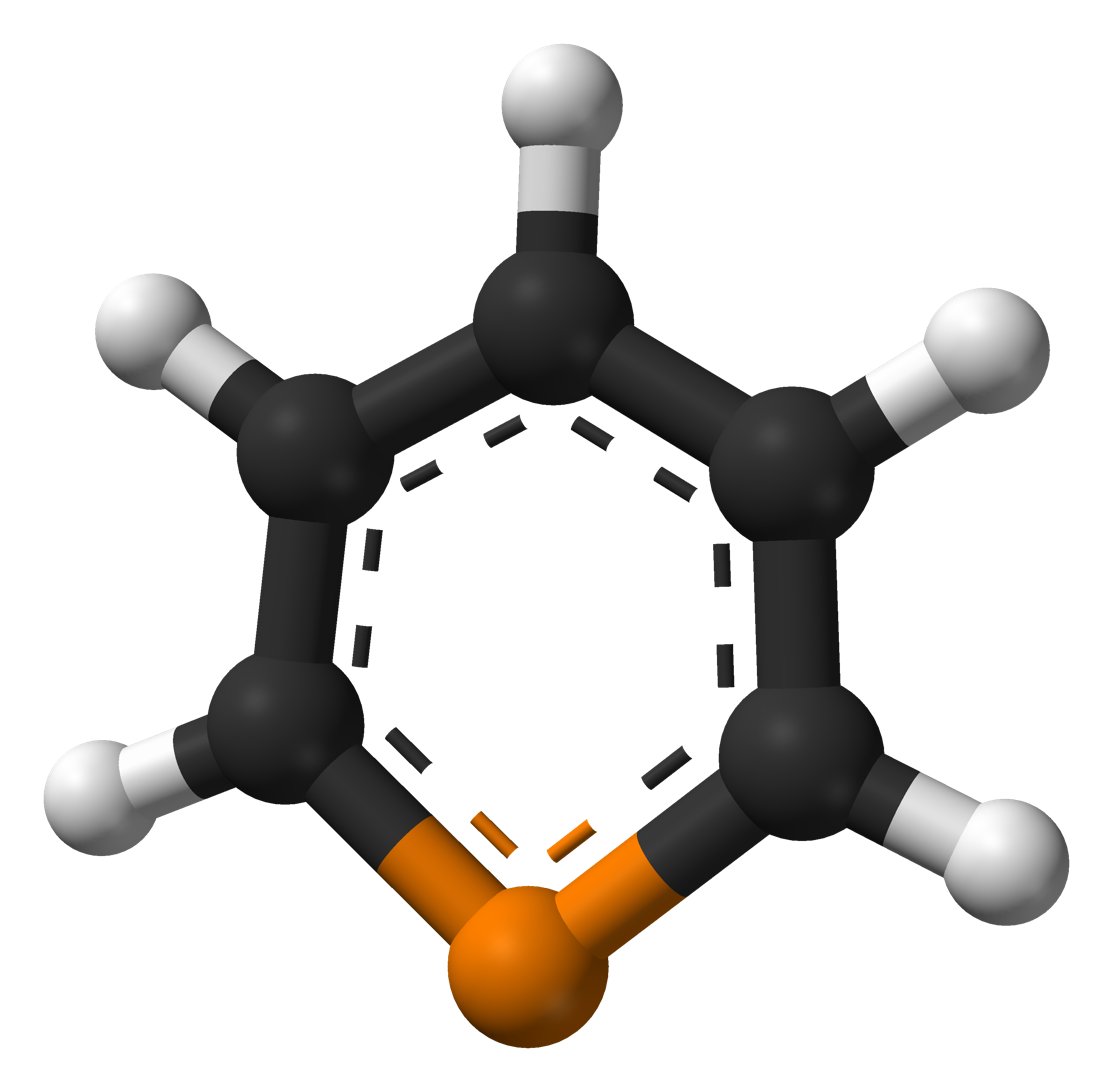
Aromatic ball and stick model of phosphorine

Names
- Preferred IUPAC name Phosphinine
- Other names Phosphabenzene

Identifiers
CAS Number	289-68-9
3D model (JSmol)	Interactive image
ChemSpider	109668
MeSH	Phosphinine
PubChem CID	123046
UNII	A8TY55D4JJ
CompTox Dashboard (EPA)	DTXSID70183096
- InChI: InChI=1S/C5H5P/c1-2-4-6-5-3-1/h1-5H Key: UNQNIRQQBJCMQR-UHFFFAOYSA-N; InChI=1/C5H5P/c1-2-4-6-5-3-1/h1-5H Key: UNQNIRQQBJCMQR-UHFFFAOYAZ
- SMILES: C1=CC=PC=C1

Properties
Chemical formula	C_{5}H_{5}P
Molar mass	96.069 g·mol^{−1}
Appearance	Colorless liquid
Boiling point	93 °C (199 °F; 366 K)
Acidity (pK_{a})	-16 (conjugate acid)

Related compounds
Related -ines	Pyridine; Arsabenzene; Silabenzene
Related compounds	Phosphole
- Except where otherwise noted, data are given for materials in their standard state (at 25 °C [77 °F], 100 kPa). verify (what is ?) Infobox references

Phosphorine (IUPAC name: phosphinine) is a heavier element analog of pyridine, containing a phosphorus atom instead of an aza- moiety. It is also called phosphabenzene and belongs to the phosphaalkene class. It is a colorless liquid that is mainly of interest in research.

Phosphorine is an air-sensitive oil but is otherwise stable when handled using air-free techniques (however, substituted derivatives can often be handled under air without risk of decomposition). In contrast, silabenzene, a related heavy-element analogue of benzene, is not only air- and moisture-sensitive but also thermally unstable without extensive steric protection.

== History ==
The first phosphorine to be isolated is 2,4,6-triphenylphosphorine. It was synthesized by Gottfried Märkl in 1966 by condensation of the corresponding pyrylium salt and phosphine or its equivalent ( P(CH_{2}OH)_{3} and P(SiMe_{3})_{3}).

The (unsubstituted) parent phosphorine was reported by Arthur J. Ashe III in 1971 by the reaction of 1,4-dihydro-1,1 dibutylstannabenzene and phosphorus tribromide. Ring-opening approaches have been developed from phospholes.

== Structure, bonding, and properties ==
Structural studies by electron diffraction reveal that phosphorine is a planar aromatic compound with 88% of aromaticity of that of benzene. Potentially relevant to its high aromaticity are the well matched electronegativities of phosphorus (2.1) and carbon (2.5). The P–C bond length is 173 pm and the C–C bond lengths center around 140 pm and show little variation.

Bond lengths and angles of benzene, pyridine, phosphorine, arsabenzene, stibabenzene and bismabenzene

Although phosphorine and pyridine are structurally similar, phosphorines are far less basic. The pK_{a} of C_{5}H_{5}PH^{+} and C_{5}H_{5}NH^{+} are respectively −16.1 and +5.2. The P-oxides are extremely unstable, rapidly adding nucleophiles to a species tetracoordinate at phosphorus. Strongly backbonding Lewis acids (e.g. tungsten pentacarbonyl) can stabilize a dative bond from phosphorus.

Both electrophiles and strong, hard nucleophiles preferentially attack at phosphorus, but the ring aromaticity is sufficiently weak that the result is an addition reaction, and not aromatic substitution. Thus for example methyllithium adds to phosphorus in phosphorine whereas it adds to the 2-position of pyridine. Halophosphorines do undergo noble-metal- or zirconocene-catalyzed substitution, and λ^{5}-phosphorines exhibit a much more traditional substitution chemistry.

Unlike arsabenzene, phosphorine rarely participates in Diels-Alder-type cycloadditions; when it does, the coupling partner must be an extremely electron-poor alkyne. Phosphorine complexes are tolerable Diels-Alder reactants.

=== Coordination chemistry ===
Coordination complexes bearing phosphorine as a ligand are known. Phosphorines can bind to metals through phosphorus center. Complexes of the diphospha analogue of 2,2′-bipyridine are known. Phosphorines also form pi-complexes, illustrated by V(η^{6}-C_{5}H_{5}P)_{2}.

== See also ==
- Six-membered aromatic rings with one carbon replaced by an element from another group: borabenzene, silabenzene, germabenzene, stannabenzene, pyridine, phosphorine, arsabenzene, stibabenzene, bismabenzene, pyrylium, thiopyrylium, selenopyrylium, telluropyrylium
