= Silabenzene =

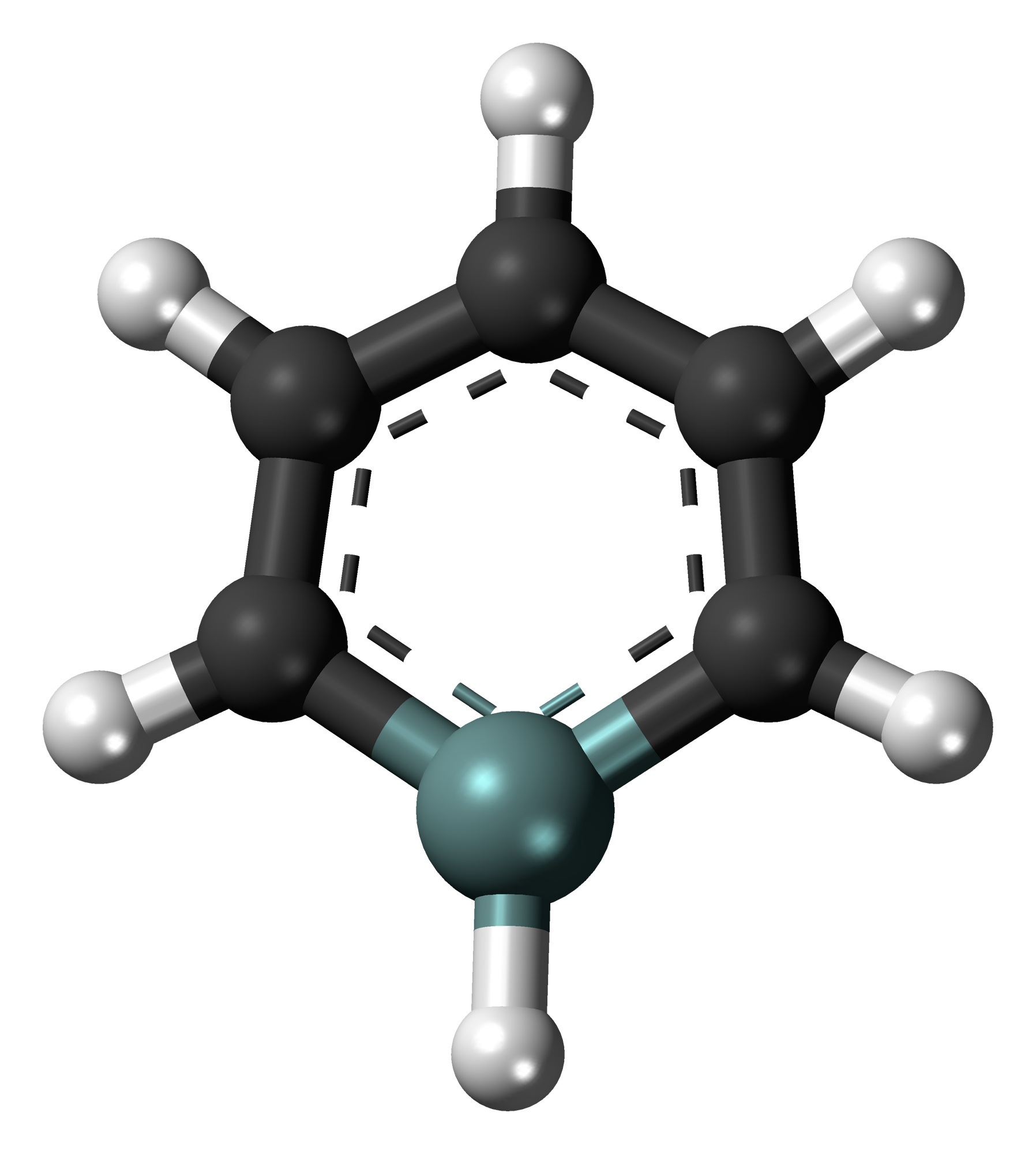

Names
- Preferred IUPAC name Siline

Identifiers
CAS Number	289-77-0
3D model (JSmol)	Interactive image
ChemSpider	119915
PubChem CID	136138
- InChI: InChI=1S/C5H6Si/c1-2-4-6-5-3-1/h1-6H Key: YJHHPIHPAJYNFT-UHFFFAOYSA-N; InChI=1/C5H6Si/c1-2-4-6-5-3-1/h1-6H Key: YJHHPIHPAJYNFT-UHFFFAOYAP
- SMILES: C1=CC=[SiH]C=C1

Properties
Chemical formula	C_{5}H_{6}Si
Molar mass	94.188 g·mol^{−1}
- Except where otherwise noted, data are given for materials in their standard state (at 25 °C [77 °F], 100 kPa). verify (what is ?) Infobox references

Structures of some unstable silabenzenes

A silabenzene is a heteroaromatic compound containing one or more silicon atoms instead of carbon atoms in benzene. A single substitution gives silabenzene proper; additional substitutions give a disilabenzene (3 theoretical isomers), trisilabenzene (3 isomers), etc.

Silabenzenes have been the targets of many theoretical and synthetic studies by organic chemists interested in the question of whether analogs of benzene with Group IV elements heavier than carbon, e.g., silabenzene, stannabenzene and germabenzene—so-called "heavy benzenes"—exhibit aromaticity.

Although several heteroaromatic compounds bearing nitrogen, oxygen, and sulfur atoms have been known since the early stages of organic chemistry, silabenzene had been considered to be a transient, un-isolable compound and was detected only in low-temperature matrices or as its Diels-Alder adduct for a long time. In recent years, however, a kinetically stabilized silabenzene and other heavy aromatic compounds with silicon or germanium atoms have been reported.

== Synthesis ==
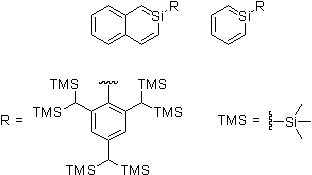
Stable 2-silanaphthalene and silabenzene

Several attempts to synthesize stable silabenzenes have been reported from the late 1970s using well-known bulky substituents such as a tert-butyl (1,1-dimethylethyl) or a TMS (trimethylsilyl) group, but such silabenzenes readily react with themselves to give the corresponding dimer even at low temperature (below -100°C) due to the high reactivity of silicon-carbon π bonds. In 1978 Barton and Burns reported that flow pyrolysis of 1‑methyl-1‑allyl-1‑silacyclohexa-2,4‑diene through a quartz tube heated to 428 °C using either ethyne or perfluoro-2-butyne as both a reactant and a carrier gas afforded the methyl-1‑silylbenzene Diel-Alder adducts, 1‑methyl-1‑silabicyclo[2.2.2]octatriene or 1‑methyl-2,3‑bis(trifluoromethyl)-1‑silabicyclo[2.2.2]octatriene, respectively, by way of a retro-ene reaction.

A computational investigation in 2013 points out a new route to stable silabenzenes at ambient conditions through Brook rearrangement. The [1,3]-Si → O shift of TMS or triisopropylsilyl (TIPS) substituted precursors with tetrahedral silicon atoms to an adjacent carbonyl oxygen lead to aromatic Brook-type silabenzenes.

Following the synthesis of the naphthalene analog 2-silanaphthalene, the first sila-aromatic compound, by Norihiro Tokitoh and Renji Okazaki in 1997, the same group reported thermally stable silabenzene in 2000 taking advantage of a new steric protective group. A 9-silaanthracene derivative has been reported in 2002, a 1-silanaphthalene also in 2002.

A 1,4-disilabenzene was reported in 2002. In 2007, 1,2-disilabenzene was synthesized via formal [2+2+2] cyclotrimerization of a disilyne (Si-Si triple bonded species) and phenylacetylene.

Some theoretical studies suggest that the symmetric 1,3,5-trisilabenzene may be more stable than 1,2-disilabenzene.

== Properties and reactions ==
Isolated silabenzene reacts with various reagents at 1,2- or 1,4-positions to give diene-type products, so the aromaticity of the silabenzene is destroyed. It is different from benzene, which reacts with electrophiles to give not dienes but substituted benzenes, so benzene sustains its aromaticity. Silicon is a semi-metal element, so the Si-C π bond in the silabenzene is highly polarized and easily broken. The silabenzene is also light-sensitive; Ultraviolet irradiation gives the valence isomer, a silabenzvalene. The theoretical calculations and the NMR chemical shifts of silabenzenes, though, show that silabenzene is an aromatic compound in spite of the different reactivity from benzene and other classical aromatic compounds.

== Hexasilabenzene ==
In calculations, the all-silicon cyclic hexasilabenzene Si_{6}H_{6} is variously predicted to have 6-fold symmetry a chair conformation. It was shown that the deviation from planarity in hexasilabenzene is caused by the pseudo Jahn–Teller effect.

A substituted hexasilaprismane compound has been known since 1993. theoretical analysis suggests that the prismane form of Si_{6}H_{6} is more stable than the aromatic-ring or Dewar benzene-like isomers.

Another compound isomeric with hexasilabenzene was first reported in 2010. This compound is reported as stable and with according to X-ray crystallography a chair-like tricyclic silicon frame.

The searching of a planar Si_{6} analogue to benzene has been extended to anionic cycles and structures bearing lithium atoms replacing hydrogens. Using density functional theory, it has been shown that from a series of planar and tridimensional structures with molecular formula Si_{6}Li_{2-8}, the global minimum is a Si_{6}Li_{6} planar ring. This particular ring has D_{2h} symmetry with 4 lithium cations placed between two adjacent silicon atoms –forming three-center two-electron bonds –and two more Li cations located above and below the center of the ring’s plane. A highly symmetric D_{6h} structure analogue to hexalithiumbenzene was found to be higher in energy by 2.04 eV to respect to the minimum.

Aromaticity was also tested using density functional calculations. DFT can be effectively used to calculate the aromaticity of various molecular systems using the B3LYP hybrid density functional; this method has been proved to be the method of choice for computing delocalized systems. The nucleus-independent chemical shifts (NICS) was selected as the quantitative criterion to evaluate the aromatic character of the structures under study. The global minimum (D_{2h} symmetry ring) and the D_{6h} symmetry ring show values of −3.95 and −5.95, respectively. In NICS calculations, negative values indicate aromaticity.

More recently, using a novel genetic algorithm, a Si_{6}Li_{6} three dimensional structure has been calculated to be more stable than planar isomers.

== See also ==
Other 6-membered aromatic rings with one carbon replaced by another group:

- Borabenzene (Boratabenzene)
- Germabenzene
- Stannabenzene
- Pyridine
- Pyrylium
- Phosphorine
- Arsabenzene
- Bismabenzene
- Thiopyrylium
- Selenopyrylium
- Telluropyrylium
