= Carbo-mer =

Organic chemical compound

In organic chemistry, a carbo-mer (often carbo-mer or carbomer) is an expanded molecule obtained by insertion of C_{2} units into a given molecule. Carbo-mers differ from their templates in size but not in symmetry when each C–C single bond is replaced by an alkyne bond C-C≡C-C, each C=C double bond is replaced by an allene bond C=C=C=C, and each C≡C triple bond is replaced by C≡C-C≡C. The size of the carbo-mer continues to increase when more C_{2} units are inserted, so carbo-mers are also called carbo^{n}-molecules, where "n" is the number of acetylene or allene groups in an n-expansion unit. This concept, devised by Rémi Chauvin in 1995, is aimed at introducing new chemical properties for existing chemical motifs.

Two distinct expansions of benzene can be called carbo-benzene (C_{18}H_{6}):

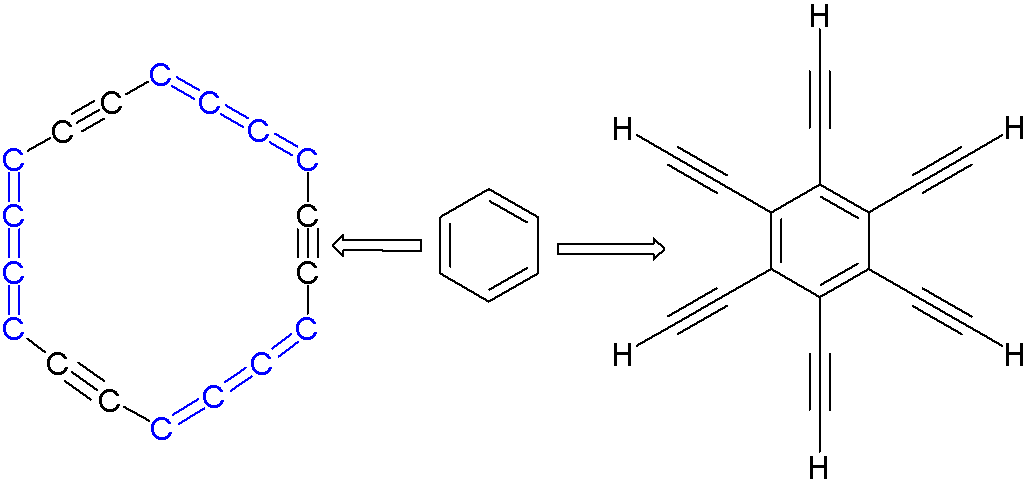

One (above right) expands each C-H bond to C-C≡C-H, making hexaethynylbenzene, a substituted benzene derivative.

One (above left) expands each C=C and C≡C bond of the benzene core, making 1,2,4,5,7,8,10,11,13,14,16,17-dodecadehydro[18]annulene. An analog of this molecule, with the hydrogen atoms replaced by phenyl groups, 3,6,9,12,15,18-hexaphenyl-1,2,4,5,7,8,10,11,13,14,16,17-dodecadehydro[18]annulene, is stable. Its proton NMR spectrum shows that the phenyl protons are shifted downfield compared to a proton position in benzene itself (chemical shift position for the ortho proton is 9.49 ppm), suggesting the presence of a diamagnetic ring current and thus aromaticity. The final step in its organic synthesis is reaction of the triol with stannous chloride and hydrochloric acid in diethyl ether:

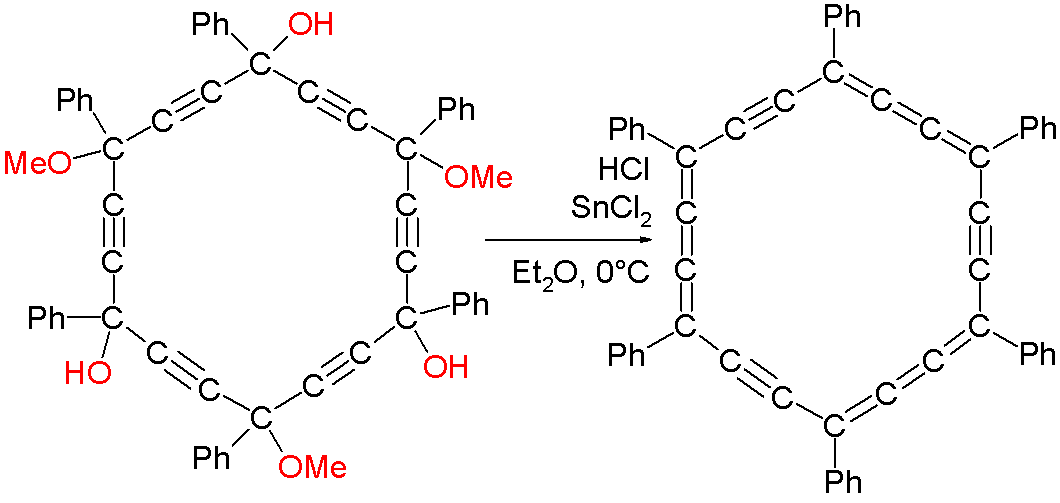

With both core and periphery expanded, the total carbo-mer of benzene (C_{30}H_{6}) only exists in silico (computer simulation).

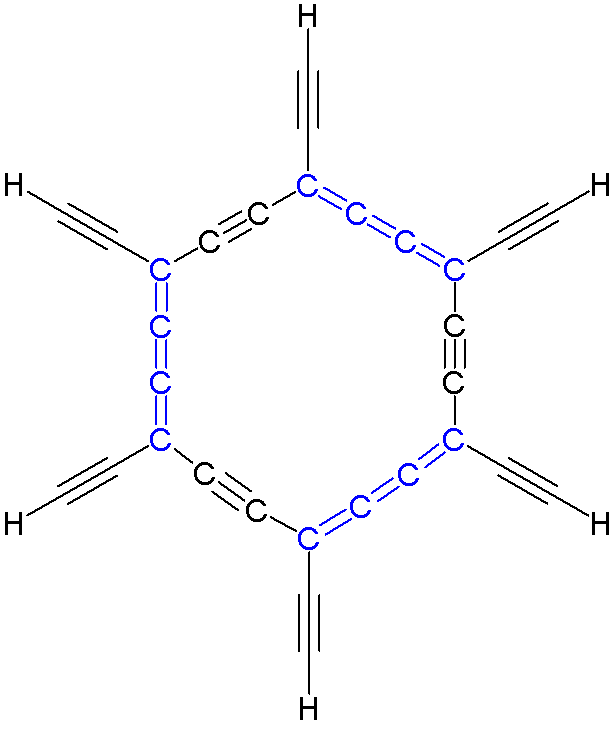

Calculations predict a planar D_{6h} structure with bond lengths similar to the other two carbobenzenes. Its non-planar isomer is called "hexaethynyl-carbo-[6]trannulene" - a pun on the all-cis annulenes - and resembles a cyclohexane ring. This hypothetical molecule is predicted to be more energetic by 65 kcal/mol.
