= Germabenzene =

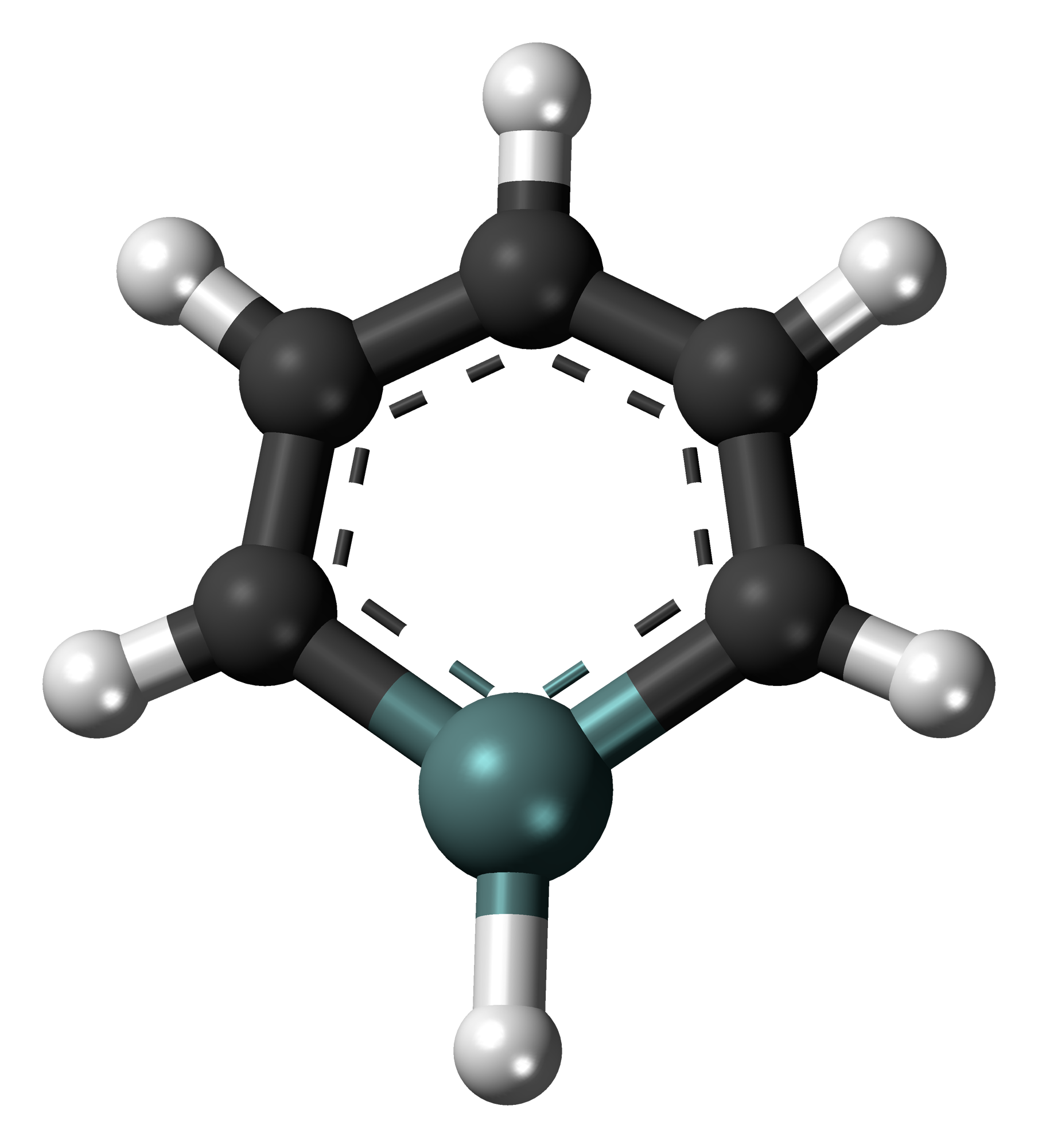

Names
- Preferred IUPAC name Germine
- Other names Germanabenzene; Germin; Germanin

Identifiers
CAS Number	75920-32-0
3D model (JSmol)	Interactive image
ChemSpider	16739132
PubChem CID	20056561
CompTox Dashboard (EPA)	DTXSID00560194
- InChI: InChI=1S/C5H6Ge/c1-2-4-6-5-3-1/h1-6H Key: ISOSVXOWIXXPIQ-UHFFFAOYSA-N
- SMILES: [H][Ge]1C=CC=CC=1

Properties
Chemical formula	C_{5}H_{6}Ge
Molar mass	138.733 g·mol^{−1}
- Except where otherwise noted, data are given for materials in their standard state (at 25 °C [77 °F], 100 kPa). verify (what is ?) Infobox references

Germabenzene (C_{5}H_{6}Ge) is the parent representative of a group of chemical compounds containing in their molecular structure a benzene ring with a carbon atom replaced by a germanium atom. Germabenzene itself has been studied theoretically, and synthesized with a bulky 2,4,6-tris[bis(trimethylsilyl)methyl]phenyl or Tbt group. Also, stable naphthalene derivatives do exist in the laboratory such as the 2-germanaphthalene-containing substance represented below. The germanium to carbon bond in this compound is shielded from potential reactants by a Tbt group. This compound is aromatic just as the other carbon group representatives silabenzene and stannabenzene.

A stable 2-germanaphthalene derivative

== See also ==
- 6-membered aromatic rings with one carbon replaced by another group: borabenzene, silabenzene, germabenzene, stannabenzene, pyridine, phosphorine, arsabenzene, bismabenzene, pyrylium, thiopyrylium, selenopyrylium, telluropyrylium
