= Stannabenzene =

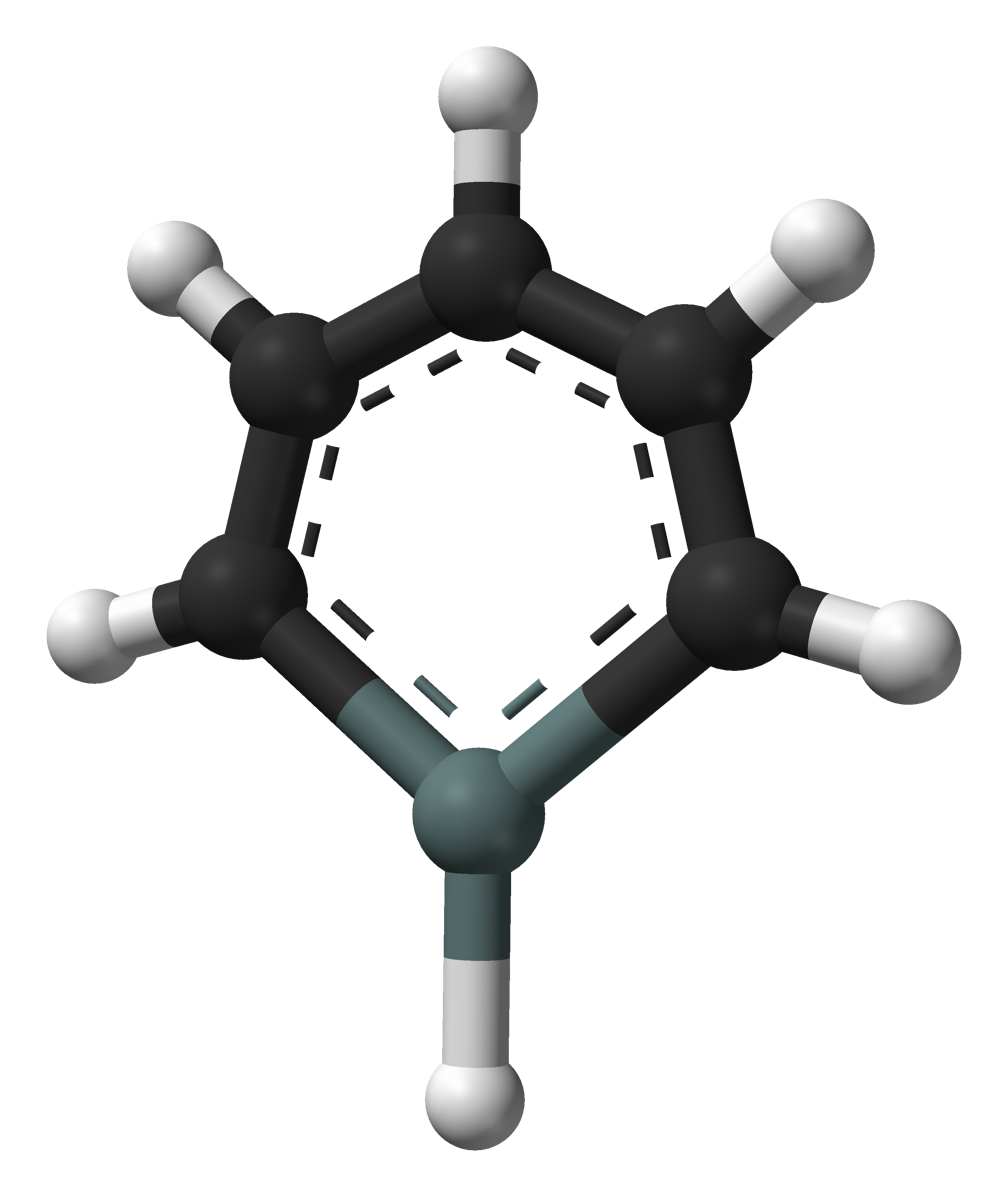

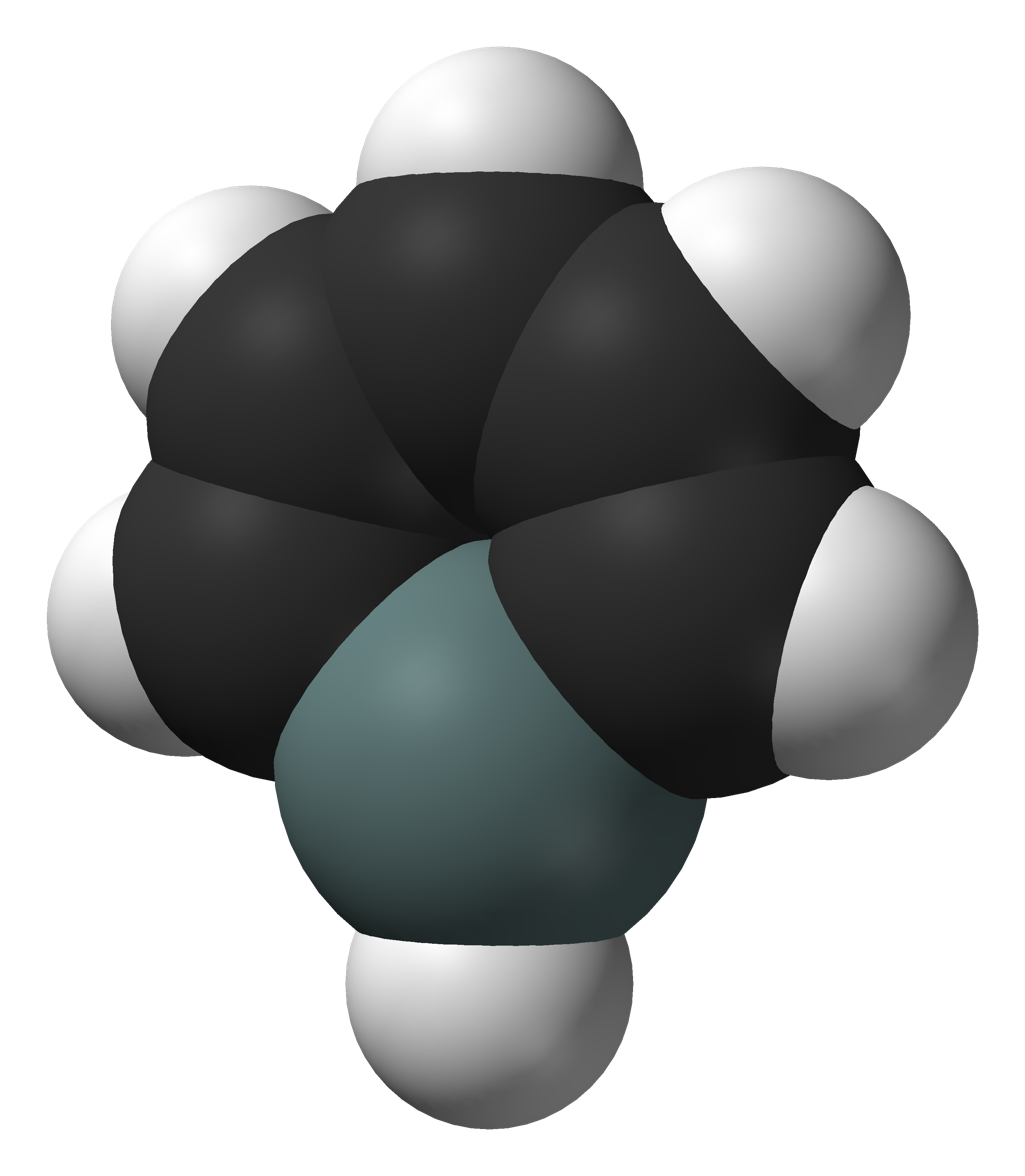

Names
- Preferred IUPAC name Stannine
- Other names Stannin

Identifiers
CAS Number	289-78-1
3D model (JSmol)	Interactive image
ChemSpider	20137777
PubChem CID	119197
CompTox Dashboard (EPA)	DTXSID70894913
- InChI: InChI=1S/C5H5.Sn.H/c1-3-5-4-2;;/h1-5H;;/b3-1?,5-4-;; Key: USOBSXNBGFXQQW-RJPIHQCFSA-N
- SMILES: [H][Sn]1=CC=CC=C1

Properties
Chemical formula	C_{5}H_{6}Sn
Molar mass	184.813 g·mol^{−1}
- Except where otherwise noted, data are given for materials in their standard state (at 25 °C [77 °F], 100 kPa). verify (what is ?) Infobox references

Stannabenzene (C_{5}H_{6}Sn) is the parent representative of a group of organotin compounds that are related to benzene with a carbon atom replaced by a tin atom. Stannabenzene itself has been studied by computational chemistry, but has not been isolated.

== Stable derivatives of stannabenzene ==
Stable derivatives of stannabenzene have been isolated. The 2-stannanaphthalene depicted below is stable in an inert atmosphere at temperatures below 140 °C. The tin to carbon bond in this compound is shielded from potential reactants by two very bulky groups, one tert-butyl group and the even larger 2,4,6-tris[bis(trimethylsilyl)methyl]phenyl or Tbt group. The two Sn-C bonds have bond lengths of 202.9 and 208.1 pm which are shorter than those for Sn-C single bonds (214 pm) and comparable to that of known Sn=C double bonds (201.6 pm). The C-C bonds show little variation with bond lengths between 135.6 and 144.3 pm signaling that this compound is aromatic.

A stable 2-stannanaphthalene derivative

Tbt-substituted 9-stannaphenanthrene was reported in 2005. At room temperature it forms the [4+2] cycloadduct.

Tbt-substituted stannabenzene was reported in 2010. At room-temperature it quantitatively forms the DA dimer.

Tbt-substituted stannabenzene synthesis. Reagents lithium aluminium hydride (step 2), NBS (step 3), LDA (step 4)

== See also ==
- 6-membered aromatic rings with one carbon replaced by another group: borabenzene, silabenzene, germabenzene, stannabenzene, pyridine, phosphorine, arsabenzene, bismabenzene, pyrylium, thiopyrylium, selenopyrylium, telluropyrylium
