= 1,5-Diazabicyclo(4.3.0)non-5-ene =

1,5-Diazabicyclo[4.3.0]non-5-ene
- 1,5-Diazabicyclo(4.3.0)non-5-ene

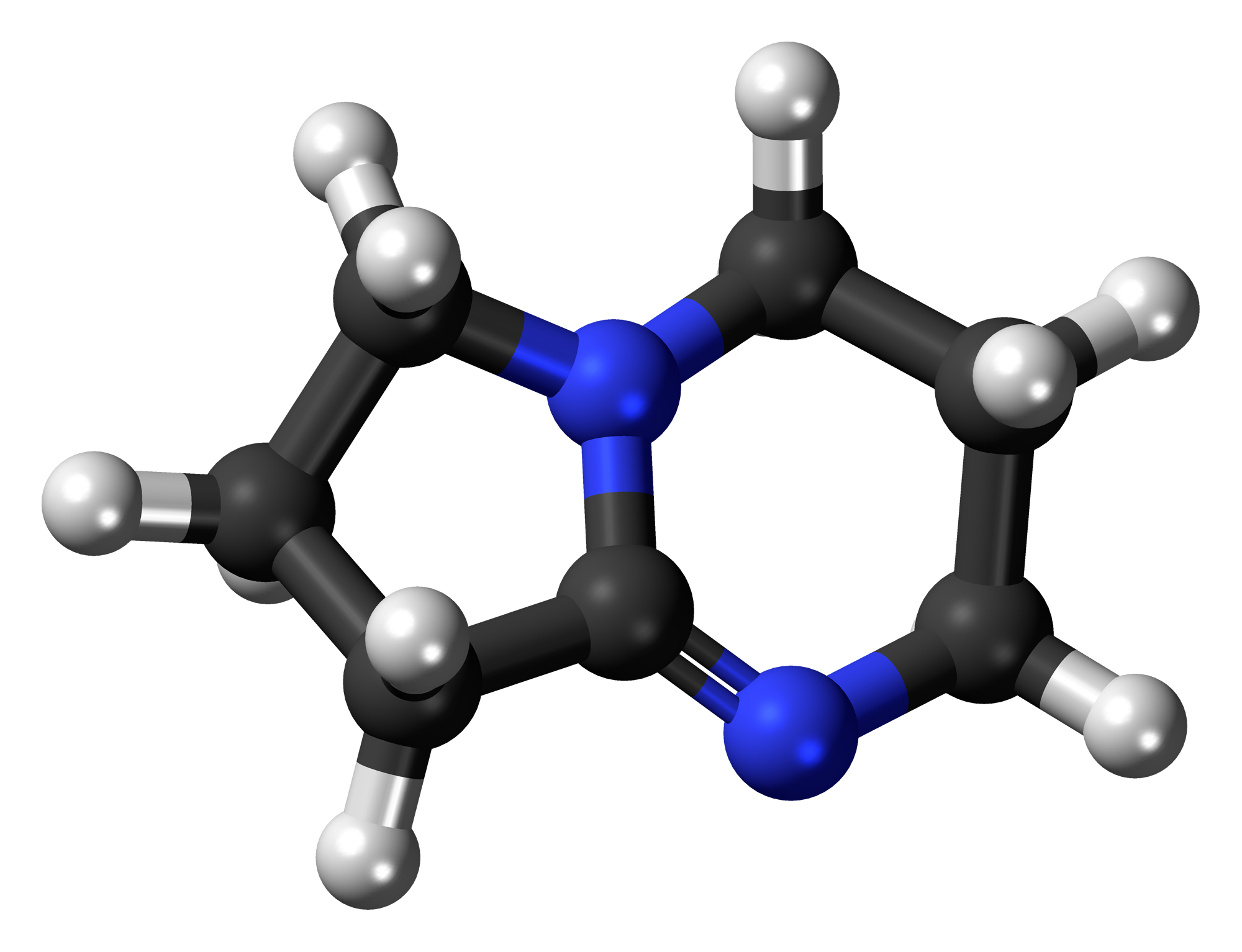

Names
- Preferred IUPAC name 2,3,4,6,7,8-Hexahydropyrrolo[1,2-a]pyrimidine
- Other names DBN

Identifiers
CAS Number	3001-72-7
3D model (JSmol)	Interactive image
ChemSpider	68826
ECHA InfoCard	100.019.171
EC Number	221-087-3
PubChem CID	76349
UNII	978M4OL12Q
CompTox Dashboard (EPA)	DTXSID10184087
- InChI: InChI=1S/C7H12N2/c1-3-7-8-4-2-6-9(7)5-1/h1-6H2 Key: SGUVLZREKBPKCE-UHFFFAOYSA-N; InChI=1/C9H12N2/c10-11-8-4-2-6-9(11)5-1-3-7(8)9/h1-6H2 Key: HHCBYVLNFWNEJX-UHFFFAOYAD; InChI=1S/C9H12N2/c10-11-8-4-2-6-9(11)5-1-3-7(8)9/h1-6H2 Key: HHCBYVLNFWNEJX-UHFFFAOYSA-N
- SMILES: C1CC2=NCCCN2C1

Properties
Chemical formula	C_{7}H_{12}N_{2}
Molar mass	124.187 g·mol^{−1}
Appearance	colorless viscous liquid
Density	1.005 g/cm^{3}
Boiling point	95 to 98 °C (203 to 208 °F; 368 to 371 K) at 7.5 mmHg
- Except where otherwise noted, data are given for materials in their standard state (at 25 °C [77 °F], 100 kPa). verify (what is ?) Infobox references

1,5-Diazabicyclo[4.3.0]non-5-ene (DBN) is a chemical compound with the formula C_{7}H_{12}N_{2}. It is an amidine base used in organic synthesis. A related compound with related functions is 1,8-diazabicyclo[5.4.0]undec-7-ene (DBU). The relatively complex nature of the formal names for DBU and DBN (hence the common use of acronyms) reflects the fact that these compounds are bicyclic and contain several functional groups.

== Synthesis ==
DBN could be synthesized in the following manner, similarly to DBU:

The synthetic procedure starts with a Michael addition of 2-pyrrolidone to acrylonitrile, followed by hydrogenation, and finally dehydration.

== Uses ==
=== As a base in organic synthesis ===
Similar to many other organic bases, DBN could be employed for dehydrohalogenation reactions, base-catalyzed rearrangement reactions, as well as Aldol condensation. Several examples are shown below:

- Elimination:

- Epimerization of penicillin derivatives, catalyzed by DBN:

- Aldol condensation:

=== DBN salt as an ionic liquid ===
The acetate salt of DBN is a room-temperature ionic liquid used for processing cellulose fibers by acting as a replacement for the unstable N-Methylmorpholine N-oxide used for making lyocell.
