= Thiopyrylium =

Ion

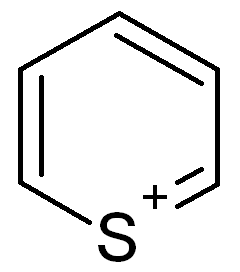

Names
- Preferred IUPAC name Thiopyrylium

Identifiers
3D model (JSmol)	Interactive image
ChemSpider	9519339
PubChem CID	11344401
CompTox Dashboard (EPA)	DTXSID301028814
- InChI: InChI=1S/C5H5S/c1-2-4-6-5-3-1/h1-5H/q+1 Key: OKYDCMQQLGECPI-UHFFFAOYSA-N
- SMILES: [s+]1ccccc1

Properties
Chemical formula	C_{5}H_{5}S^{+}
Molar mass	97.16 g/mol
Solubility in water	Reacts
- Except where otherwise noted, data are given for materials in their standard state (at 25 °C [77 °F], 100 kPa). Infobox references

Thiopyrylium is a cation with the chemical formula C_{5}H_{5}S^{+}. It is analogous to the pyrylium cation with the oxygen atom replaced by a sulfur atom.

Thiopyrylium salts are less reactive than the analogous pyrylium salts due to the higher polarizability of the sulfur atom. Among the chalcogenic 6-membered unsaturated heterocycles, thiopyrylium is the most aromatic, due to sulfur having the similar Pauling electronegativity as carbon and only a slightly higher covalent radius. In water, thiopyrylium reacts to it and forms a mixture of 2-hydroxythiopyran and 4-hydroxythiopyran.

Thiopyrylium salts can be synthesized by hydrogen abstraction from thiopyran by a hydride ion acceptor, such as trityl perchlorate.

The thiopyrylium analogue of 2,4,6-trisubstituted pyrylium salts can be synthesized by treatment with sodium sulfide followed by precipitation with acid. This reaction causes the oxygen atom in the pyrylium cation to be substituted with sulfur.

== See also ==
- Pyrylium
- Selenopyrylium
- Telluropyrylium
