= Bismabenzene =

Names
- Preferred IUPAC name Bismine
- Other names Bismin

Identifiers
CAS Number	289-52-1
3D model (JSmol)	Interactive image
ChemSpider	119910
PubChem CID	136133
CompTox Dashboard (EPA)	DTXSID50183094
- InChI: InChI=1S/C5H5Bi/c1-2-4-6-5-3-1/h1-5H Key: ZEBPXYQZSWNMLH-UHFFFAOYSA-N
- SMILES: C1=CC=[Bi]C=C1

Properties
Chemical formula	C_{5}H_{5}Bi
Molar mass	274.075 g·mol^{−1}
- Except where otherwise noted, data are given for materials in their standard state (at 25 °C [77 °F], 100 kPa). Infobox references

Bismabenzene (C_{5}H_{5}Bi) is the parent representative of a group of organobismuth compounds that are related to benzene with a carbon atom replaced by a bismuth atom. Bismabenzene itself has been synthesised but not isolated because it is too reactive, tending to instead dimerize in a Diels-Alder addition.

Bond lengths and angles of benzene, pyridine, phosphorine, arsabenzene, stibabenzene, and bismabenzene

An unstable derivative with 4-alkyl substituents was reported in 1982. A stable derivative, with two ortho tri(isopropyl)silyl substituents, was synthesized from aluminacyclohexadiene, bismuth trichloride, and DBU in 2016.
