= Pyrrole =

Organic ring compound (C4H4NH)

Explicit structural formula of pyrrole, with aromaticity indicated by dashed bonds
Numbered skeletal formula of pyrrole
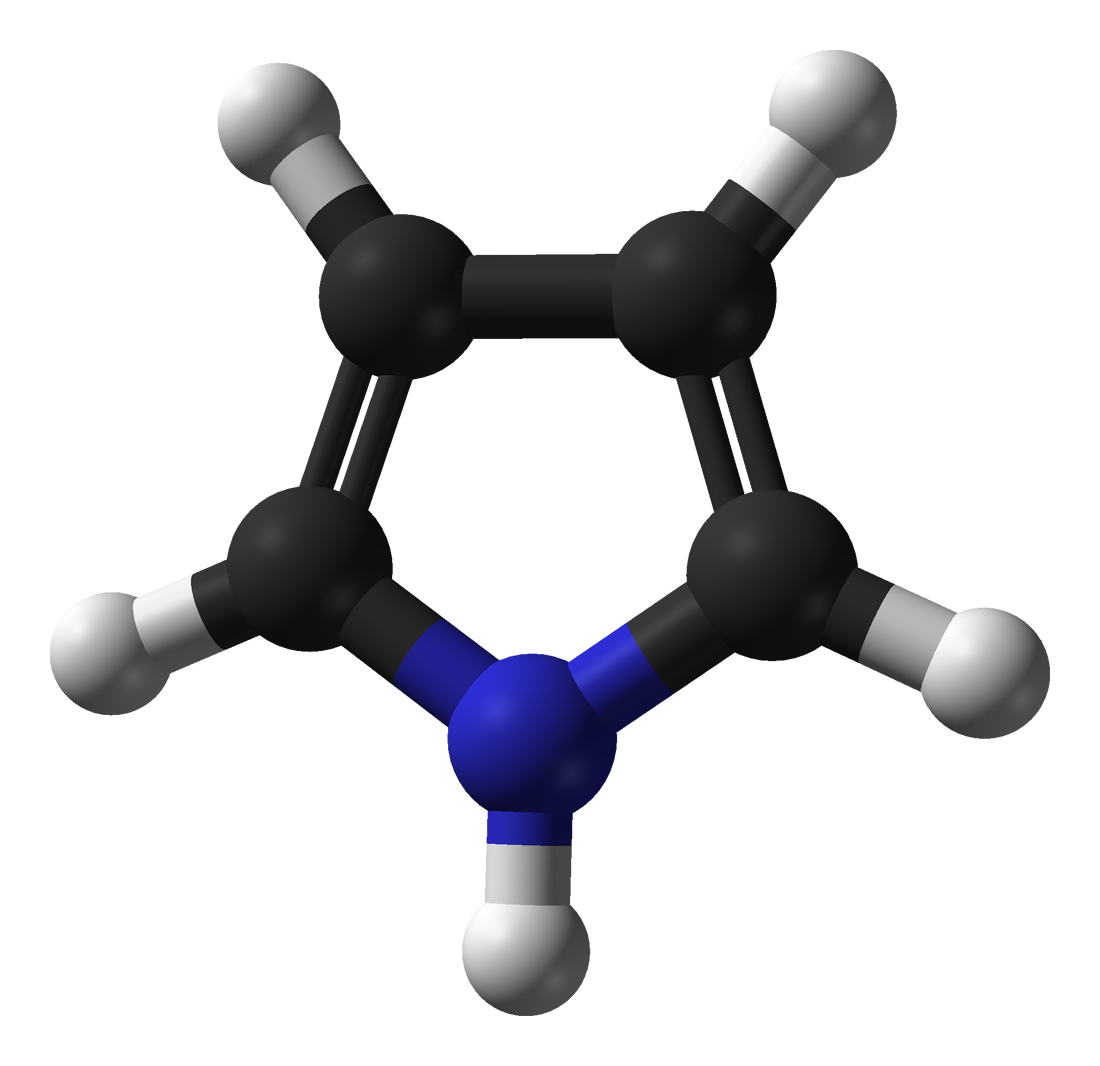
Ball-and-stick model of the pyrrole molecule
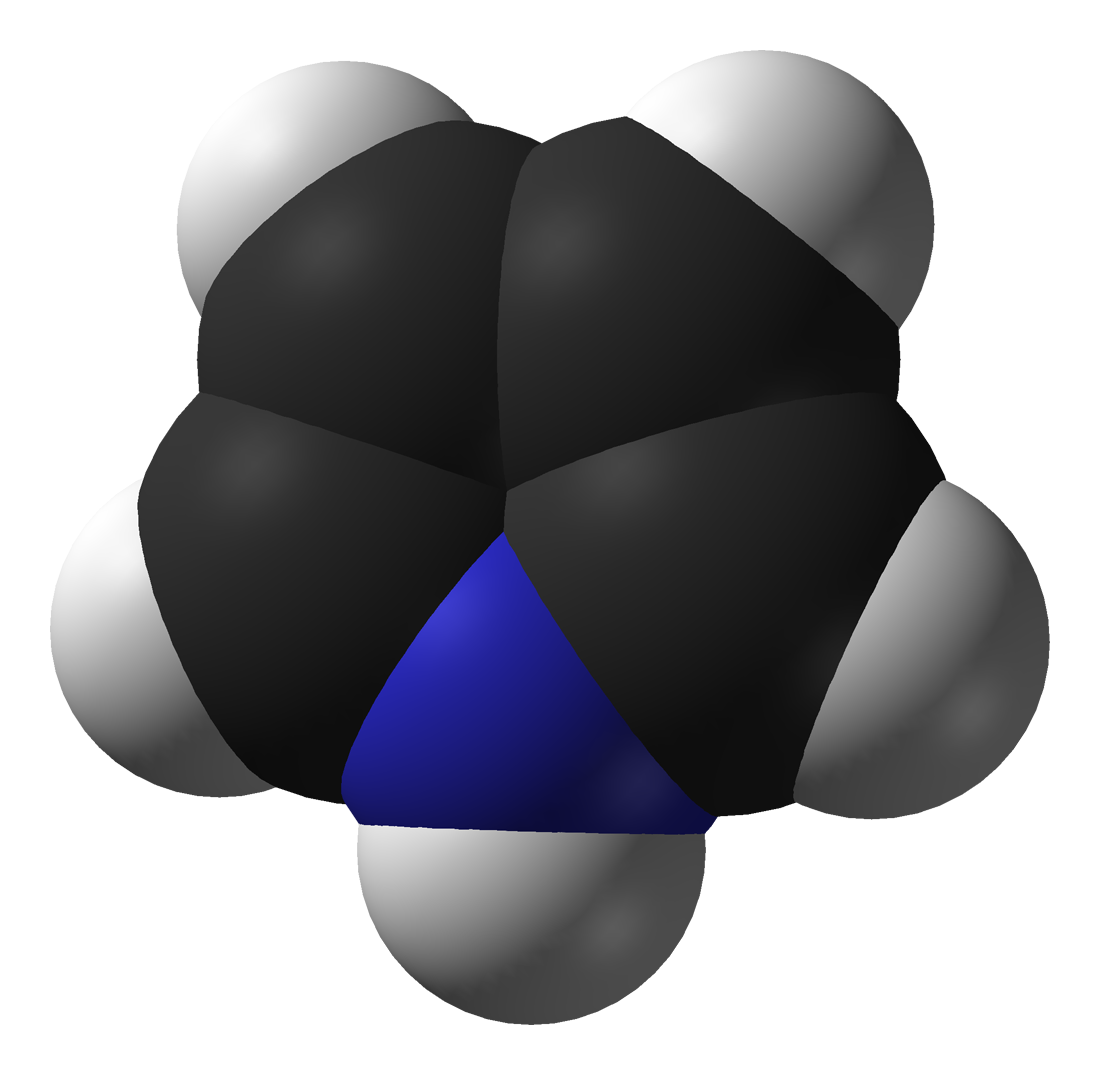
Space-filling model of the pyrrole molecule

Names
- Preferred IUPAC name 1H-Pyrrole
- Other names: Azole; Imidole

Identifiers
CAS Number	109-97-7
3D model (JSmol)	Interactive image; Interactive image
Beilstein Reference	1159
ChEBI	CHEBI:19203
ChEMBL	ChEMBL16225
ChemSpider	7736
ECHA InfoCard	100.003.387
EC Number	203-724-7
Gmelin Reference	1705
PubChem CID	8027
RTECS number	UX9275000
UNII	86S1ZD6L2C
UN number	1992, 1993
CompTox Dashboard (EPA)	DTXSID5021910
- InChI: InChI=1S/C4H5N/c1-2-4-5-3-1/h1-5H Key: KAESVJOAVNADME-UHFFFAOYSA-N; InChI=1/C4H5N/c1-2-4-5-3-1/h1-5H
- SMILES: N1C=CC=C1; [nH]1cccc1

Properties
Chemical formula	C_{4}H_{5}N
Molar mass	67.091 g·mol^{−1}
Appearance	colorless volatile liquid
Density	0.967 g cm^{−3}
Melting point	−23 °C (−9 °F; 250 K)
Boiling point	129 to 131 °C (264 to 268 °F; 402 to 404 K)
Vapor pressure	7 mmHg at 23 °C
Acidity (pK_{a})	17.5 (for the N−H proton)
Basicity (pK_{b})	13.6 (pK_{a} 0.4 for C.A.)
Magnetic susceptibility (χ)	−47.6×10^{−6} cm^{3} mol^{−1}
Viscosity	0.001225 Pa s

Thermochemistry
Heat capacity (C)	1.903 J K^{−1} mol^{−1}
Std enthalpy of formation (Δ_{f}H^{⦵}_{298})	108.2 kJ mol^{−1} (gas)
Std enthalpy of combustion (Δ_{c}H^{⦵}_{298})	2242 kJ mol^{−1}

Hazards
NFPA 704 (fire diamond)	2 2 0
Flash point	33.33 °C (91.99 °F; 306.48 K)
Autoignition temperature	550 °C (1,022 °F; 823 K)
Explosive limits	3.1–14.8%
Safety data sheet (SDS)	Chemical Safety Data

Related compounds
Related compounds	Phosphole, arsole, bismole, stibole
- Except where otherwise noted, data are given for materials in their standard state (at 25 °C [77 °F], 100 kPa). verify (what is ?) Infobox references

Pyrrole is a heterocyclic, aromatic, organic compound, a five-membered ring with the formula C_{4}H_{4}NH. It is a colorless volatile liquid that darkens readily upon exposure to air. Substituted derivatives are also called pyrroles, e.g., N-methylpyrrole, C_{4}H_{4}NCH_{3}. Porphobilinogen, a trisubstituted pyrrole, is the biosynthetic precursor to many natural products such as heme.

Pyrroles are components of more complex macrocycles, including the porphyrinogens and products derived therefrom, including porphyrins of heme, the chlorins, bacteriochlorins, and chlorophylls.

== Properties, structure, bonding ==
Pyrrole is a colorless volatile liquid that darkens readily upon exposure to air, and is usually purified by distillation immediately before use. Pyrrole has a nutty odor. Pyrrole is a 5-membered aromatic heterocycle, like furan and thiophene. Unlike furan and thiophene, it has a dipole in which the positive end lies on the side of the heteroatom, with a dipole moment of 1.58 D. In CDCl_{3}, it has chemical shifts at 6.68 (H2, H5) and 6.22 (H3, H4). Pyrrole is an extremely weak base for an amine, with a conjugate acid pK_{a} of −3.8. The most thermodynamically stable pyrrolium cation (C_{4}H_{6}N^{+}) is formed by protonation at the 2 position. Substitution of pyrrole with alkyl substituents provides a more basic molecule—for example, tetramethylpyrrole has a conjugate acid pK_{a} of +3.7. Pyrrole is also weakly acidic at the N–H position, with a pK_{a} of 16.5. As a hydrogen bonding Lewis acid it is classified as a hard acid and the ECW model lists its acid parameters as E_{A} = 1.38 and C_{A} = 0.68.

Pyrrole has aromatic character because the lone pairs of electrons on the nitrogen atom is partially delocalized into the ring, creating a 4n + 2 aromatic system (see Hückel's rule). In terms of its aromaticity, pyrrole's is modest relative to benzene but comparable to related heterocycles thiophene and furan. The resonance energies of benzene, pyrrole, thiophene, and furan are, respectively, 152, 88, 121, and 67 kJ/mol (36, 21, 29, and 16 kcal/mol). The molecule is flat.

== History ==
Pyrrole was first detected by F. F. Runge in 1834, as a constituent of coal tar. In 1857, it was isolated from the pyrolysate of bone. Its name comes from the Greek pyrrhos (πυρρός, "reddish, fiery"), from the reaction used to detect it—the red color that it imparts to wood when moistened with hydrochloric acid.

== Occurrence in nature ==
Structure of Heme B

Pyrrole itself is not naturally occurring, but many of its derivatives are found in a variety of cofactors and natural products. Common naturally produced molecules containing pyrroles include vitamin B_{12}, bile pigments like bilirubin and biliverdin, and the porphyrins of heme, chlorophyll, chlorins, bacteriochlorins, and porphyrinogens. Other pyrrole-containing secondary metabolites include PQQ, makaluvamine M, ryanodine, rhazinilam, lamellarin, prodigiosin, myrmicarin, and sceptrin. The syntheses of pyrrole-containing haemin, synthesized by Hans Fischer was recognized by the Nobel Prize.

Pyrrole is a constituent of tobacco smoke and may contribute to its toxic effects.

== Synthesis ==
Pyrrole is prepared industrially by treatment of furan with ammonia in the presence of solid acid catalysts, like SiO_{2} and Al_{2}O_{3}.

Synthesis of pyrrole from furan

Pyrrole can also be formed by catalytic dehydrogenation of pyrrolidine.

Several syntheses of the pyrrole ring have been described. Three routes dominate, but many other methods exist.

=== Hantzsch pyrrole synthesis ===
The Hantzsch pyrrole synthesis is the reaction of β-ketoesters (1) with ammonia (or primary amines) and α-haloketones (2) to give substituted pyrroles (3).

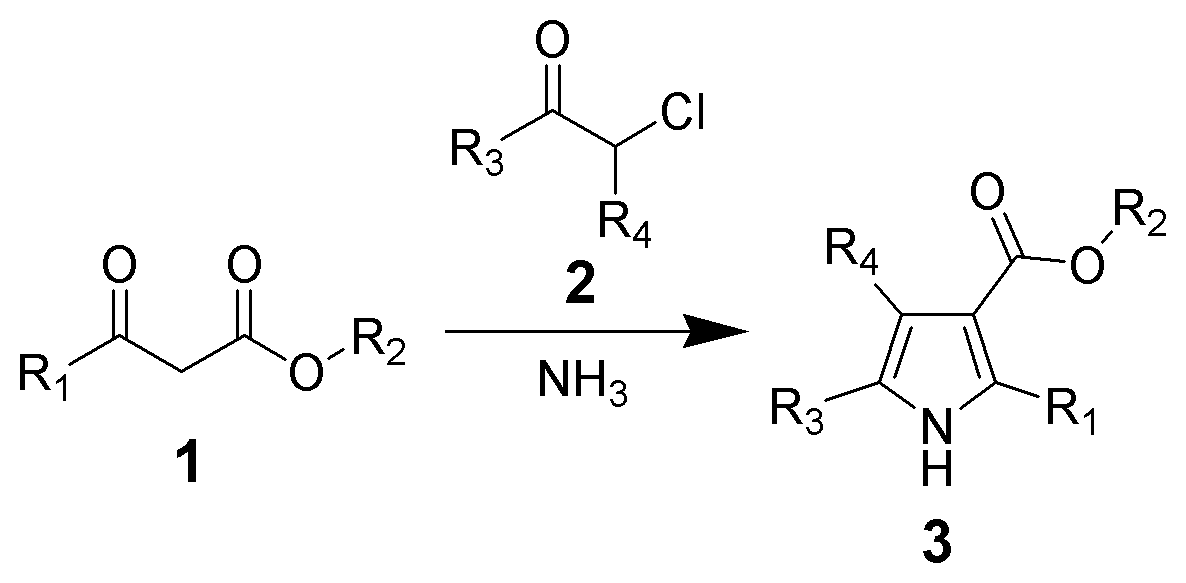
The Hantzsch pyrrole synthesis

=== Knorr pyrrole synthesis ===
The Knorr pyrrole synthesis involves the reaction of an α-amino ketone or an α-amino-β-ketoester with an activated methylene compound. The method involves the reaction of an α-aminoketone (1) and a compound containing a methylene group α to (bonded to the next carbon to) a carbonyl group (2).

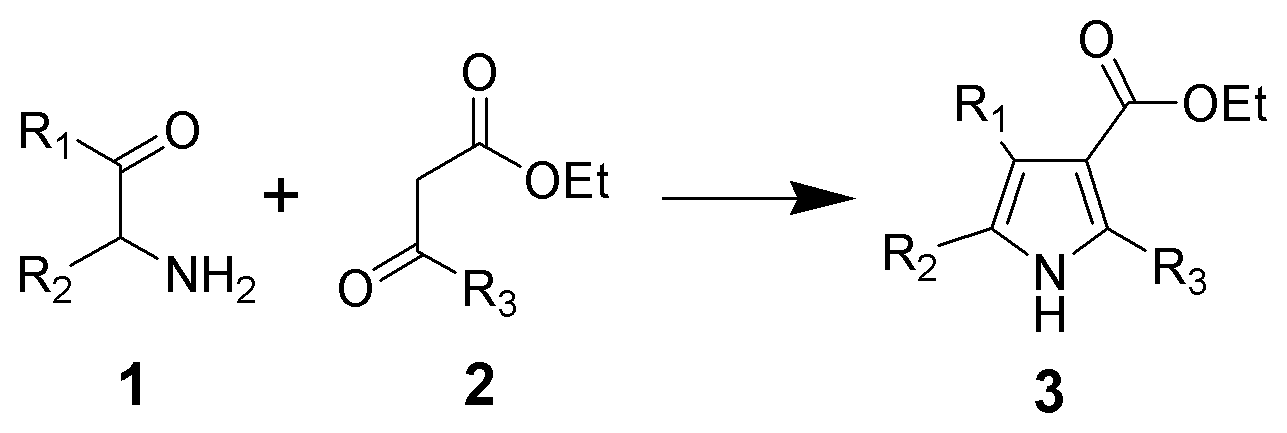
The Knorr pyrrole synthesis

=== Paal–Knorr pyrrole synthesis ===
In the Paal–Knorr pyrrole synthesis, a 1,4-dicarbonyl compound reacts with ammonia or a primary amine to form a substituted pyrrole.

The Paal–Knorr pyrrole synthesis

=== Other methods ===
Using a modification of the Van Leusen reaction, pyrroles are produced by reaction of tosylmethyl isocyanide (TosMIC) with an enone in the presence of base. Unlike the usual Van Leusen reaction with a simple carbonyl to which TosMIC adds directly, it undergoes a Michael addition. The carbon of the resulting enolate can act as a nucleophile in a 5-endo cyclization to form a 5-membered ring. An elimination of the tosyl group and eventual tautomerization gives the pyrrole.

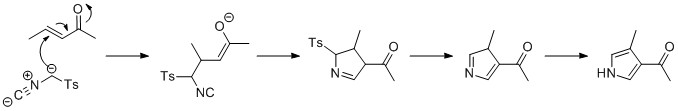
Mechanism of the Van Leusen reaction to form pyrroles

In the Barton–Zard reaction, an isocyanoacetate reacts with a nitroalkene in a 1,4-addition, followed by 5-endo-dig cyclization, elimination of the nitro group, and tautomerization.

The Piloty–Robinson pyrrole synthesis forms substituted pyrroles starting from azines. Azines can be formed condensation of two aldehydes or ketones with hydrazine.

Pyrroles bearing multiple substituents have been obtained from the reaction of münchnones and alkynes. The reaction mechanism involves 1,3-dipolar cycloaddition followed by loss of carbon dioxide by a retro-Diels–Alder reaction. Similar reactions can be performed using azalactones.

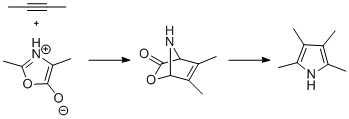
Synthesis of pyrroles via Diels–Alder cyclization

Pyrroles can also be prepared by silver-catalyzed cyclization of alkynes with isonitriles, where R^{2} is an electron-withdrawing group, and R^{1} is an alkane, aryl group, or ester. Examples of disubstituted alkynes have also been seen to form the desired pyrrole in considerable yield. The reaction is proposed to proceed via a silver acetylide intermediate. This method is analogous to the azide–alkyne click chemistry used to form azoles.

Synthesis of pyrrole via silver click chemistry

One synthetic route to pyrrole involves the decarboxylation of ammonium mucate, the ammonium salt of mucic acid. The salt is typically heated in a distillation setup with glycerol as a solvent.

Synthesis of pyrrole from ammonium mucate

The Trofimov reaction allows for the synthesis of 2,3-disubstituted pyrroles from ketoximes and acetylene in basic medium.

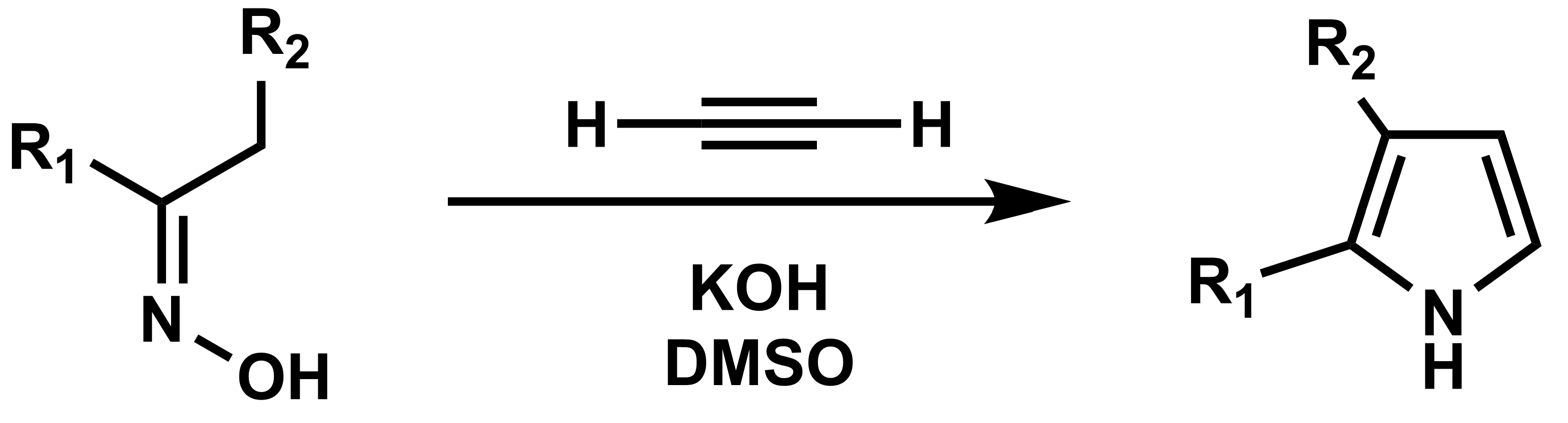
Synthesis of pyrrole through the Trofimov reaction

== Biosynthesis ==
The biosynthesis of pyrrole rings begins with aminolevulinic acid (ALA), which is synthesized from glycine and succinyl-CoA. ALA dehydratase catalyzes the condensation of two ALA molecules via a Knorr-type ring synthesis to form porphobilinogen (PBG). This later reacts to form, for example, the macrocycles heme and chlorophyll.

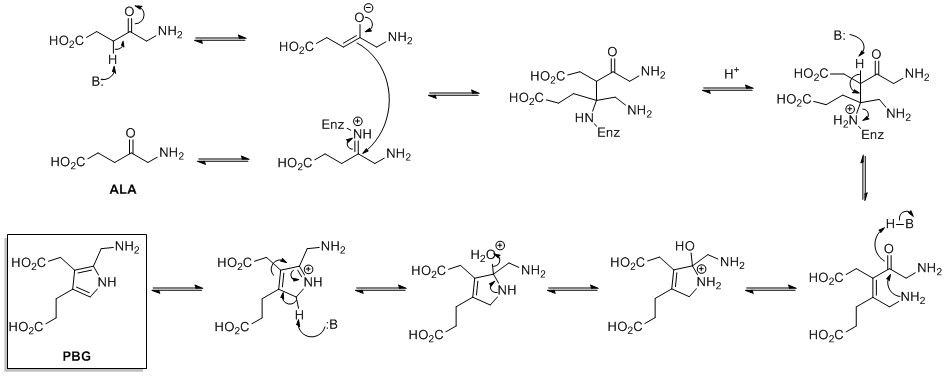
Mechanism of biosynthesis of porphobilinogen

.

Proline is biosynthetically derived from the amino acid L-glutamate. Glutamate-5-semialdehyde is first formed by glutamate 5-kinase (ATP-dependent) and glutamate-5-semialdehyde dehydrogenase (which requires NADH or NADPH). This can then either spontaneously cyclize to form 1-pyrroline-5-carboxylic acid, which is reduced to proline by pyrroline-5-carboxylate reductase (using NADH or NADPH), or turned into ornithine by ornithine aminotransferase, followed by cyclisation by ornithine cyclodeaminase to form proline.

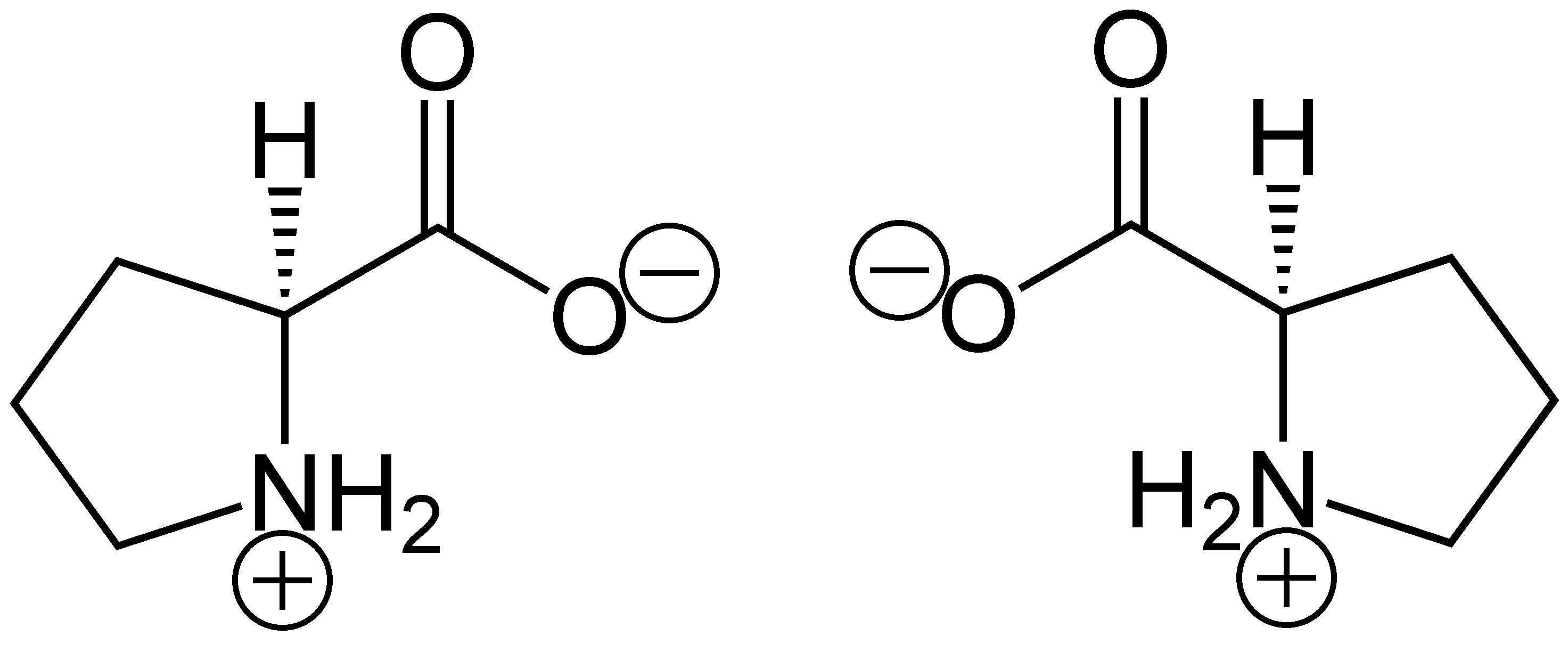
Zwitterionic structure of both proline enantiomers: (S)-proline (left) and (R)-proline

Proline can be used as precursor of aromatic pyrroles in secondary natural products, as in prodigiosins.

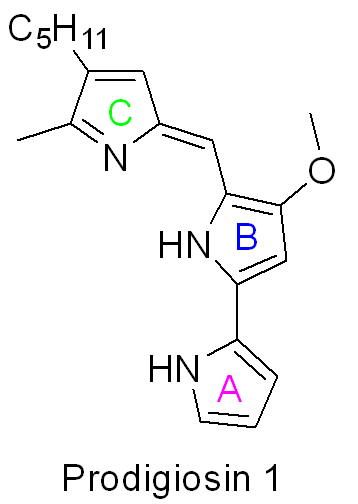
Figure 1: Structure of Prodigiosin 1 highlighting the A, B, and C pyrrole rings

The biosynthesis of Prodigiosin involves the convergent coupling of three pyrrole type rings (labeled A, B, and C in figure 1) from L-proline, L-serine, L-methionine, pyruvate, and 2-octenal.

Ring A is synthesized from L-proline through the nonribosomal peptide synthase (NRPS) pathway (figure 2), wherein the pyrrolidine ring of proline is oxidized twice through FAD^{+} to yield pyrrole ring A.

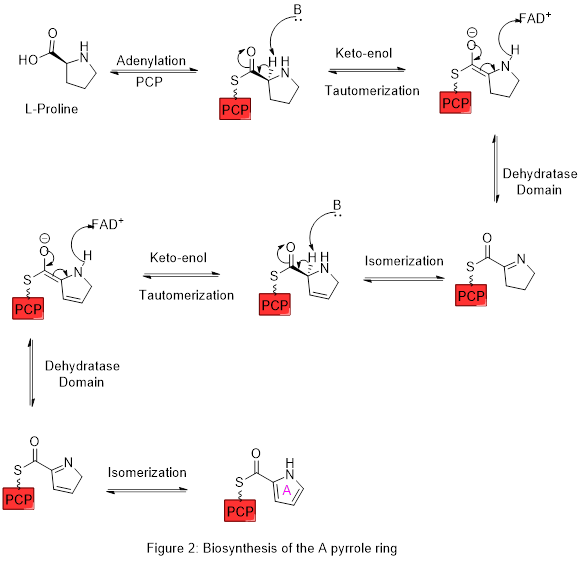

Ring A is then expanded via the polyketide synthase pathway to incorporate L-serine into ring B (figure 3). Ring A fragment is transferred from the peptidyl carrier protein (PCP) to the Acyl Carrier Protein (ACP) by a KS domain, followed by transfer to malonyl-ACP via decarboxylative Claisen condensation. This fragment is then able to react with the masked carbanion formed from the PLP mediated decarboxylation of L-serine, which cyclizes in a dehydration reaction to yield the second pyrrole ring. This intermediate is then modified by methylation (which incorporates a methyl group from L-methionine onto the alcohol at the 6 position) and oxidation of the primary alcohol to the aldehyde to yield the core A–B ring structures.

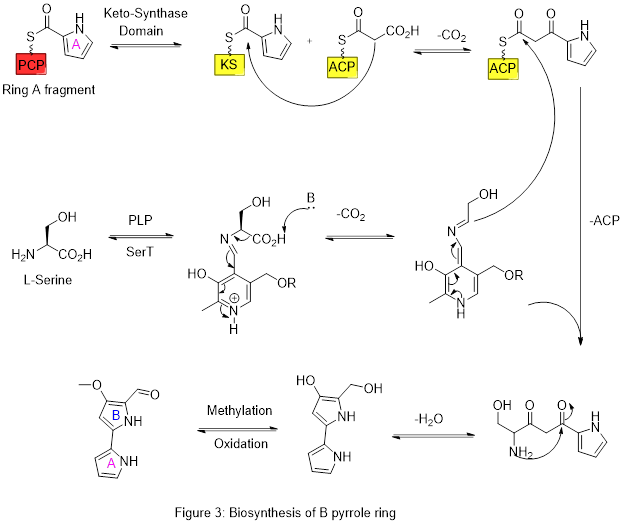

== Reactions and reactivity ==
Due to its aromatic character, pyrrole is difficult to hydrogenate, does not easily react as a diene in Diels–Alder reactions, and does not undergo usual olefin reactions. Its reactivity is similar to that of benzene and aniline, in that it is easy to alkylate and acylate. Under acidic conditions, pyrroles oxidize easily to polypyrrole, and thus many electrophilic reagents that are used in benzene chemistry are not applicable to pyrroles. In contrast, substituted pyrroles (including protected pyrroles) have been used in a broad range of transformations.

=== Reaction of pyrrole with electrophiles ===
Pyrroles generally react with electrophiles at the α position (C2 or C5), due to the highest degree of stability of the protonated intermediate.

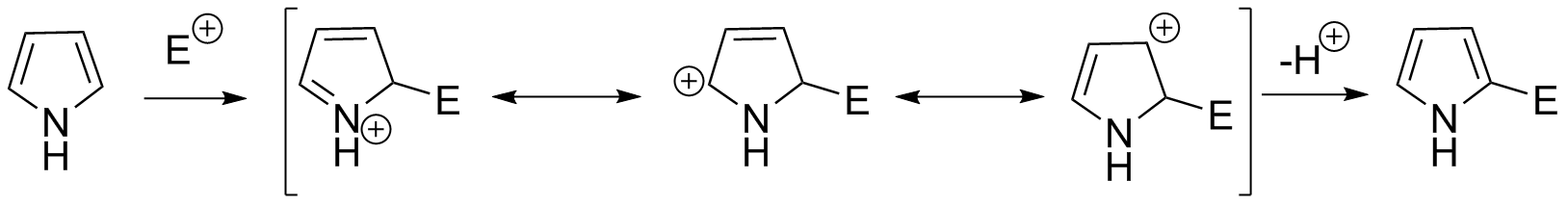
Pyrrole electrophilic substitution

Pyrroles react easily with nitrating agents (e.g. HNO_{3}/Ac_{2}O), sulfonating (Py·SO_{3}), and halogenating agents (e.g. NCS, NBS, Br_{2}, SO_{2}Cl_{2}, and KI/H_{2}O_{2}). Halogenation generally provides polyhalogenated pyrroles, but monohalogenation can be performed. As is typical for electrophilic additions to pyrroles, halogenation generally occurs at the 2-position, but can also occur at the 3-position by silation of the nitrogen. This is a useful method for further functionalization of the generally less reactive 3-position.

==== Acylation ====
Acylation generally occurs at the 2-position, through the use of various methods. Acylation with acid anhydrides and acid chlorides can occur with or without a catalyst. 2-Acylpyrroles are also obtained from reaction with nitriles, by the Houben–Hoesch reaction. Pyrrole aldehydes can be formed by a Vilsmeier–Haack reaction.

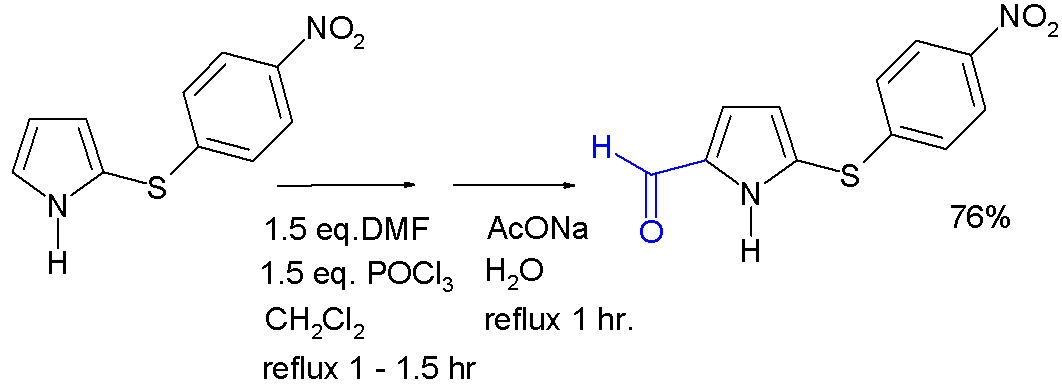
Vilsmeier–Haack formylation of pyrrole

=== Reaction of deprotonated pyrrole ===
The NH proton in pyrroles is moderately acidic with a pK_{a} of 17.5. Pyrrole can be deprotonated with strong bases such as butyllithium and sodium hydride. The resulting alkali pyrrolide is nucleophilic. Treating this conjugate base with an electrophile such as iodomethane gives N-methylpyrrole.

N-Metalated pyrrole can react with electrophiles at the N or C positions, depending on the degree of coordination. Nitrophilic metals, such as MgX, lead to alkylation at C (mainly C2). More ionic nitrogen–metal bonds (such as with lithium, sodium, and potassium) and more solvation each lead to N-alkylation.

Metalation at carbon is more facile if the N is already substituted. Alkyl groups can be introduced at C2 by cross-coupling reactions or as electrophiles:

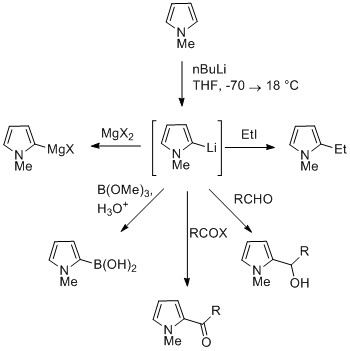
Pyrrole C-metalation

C3 derivatization can be achieved with N-substituted 3-bromopyrrole, itself from NBS bromination of N-silylpyrrole.

=== Reductions ===
Pyrroles can undergo reductions to pyrrolidines and to pyrrolines. For example, Birch reduction of pyrrole esters and amides produced pyrrolines, with the regioselectivity depending on the position of the electron-withdrawing group.

=== Cyclization reactions ===
Pyrroles with N-substitution can undergo cycloaddition reactions such as [4+2]-, [2+2]-, and [2+1]-cyclizations. Diels-Alder cyclizations can occur with the pyrrole acting as a diene, especially in the presence of an electron-withdrawing group on the nitrogen. Vinylpyrroles can also act as dienes.

Pyrrole DA

Pyrroles can react with carbenes, such as dichlorocarbene, in a [2+1]-cycloaddition. With dichlorocarbene, a dichlorocyclopropane intermediate is formed, which breaks down to form 3-chloropyridine (the Ciamician–Dennstedt rearrangement).

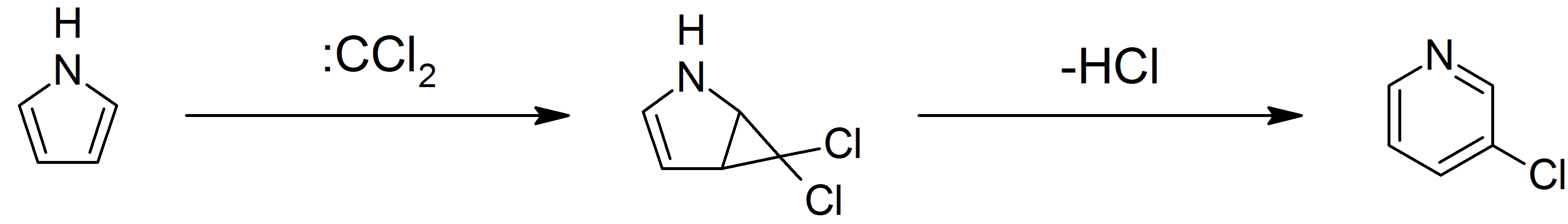
Ciamician–Dennstedt rearrangement

== Commercial uses ==
Polypyrrole is of some commercial value. N-Methylpyrrole is a precursor to N-methylpyrrolecarboxylic acid, a building-block in pharmaceutical chemistry. Pyrroles are also found in several drugs, including atorvastatin, ketorolac, and sunitinib. Pyrroles are used as lightfast red, scarlet, and carmine pigments.

== Analogs and derivatives ==
Structural analogs of pyrrole include:

- Pyrroline, a partially saturated analog with one double bond
- Pyrrolidine, the saturated hydrogenated analog

Derivatives of pyrrole include indole, a derivative with a fused benzene ring.

== See also ==
- Simple aromatic rings
- Tetrapyrrole
- Polypyrrole
- Azonine
