= Oxonine =

Names
- IUPAC name (2Z,4Z,6Z,8Z)-Oxonine
- Other names Oxonine; Oxonin

Identifiers
CAS Number	293-59-4
3D model (JSmol)	Interactive image
ChemSpider	10417798
PubChem CID	13287581
CompTox Dashboard (EPA)	DTXSID30534843
- InChI: InChI=1S/C8H8O/c1-2-4-6-8-9-7-5-3-1/h1-8H Key: JGTULGMLMBMIOP-UHFFFAOYSA-N
- SMILES: C1=CC=COC=CC=C1

Properties
Chemical formula	C_{8}H_{8}O
Molar mass	120.151 g·mol^{−1}
- Except where otherwise noted, data are given for materials in their standard state (at 25 °C [77 °F], 100 kPa). Infobox references

Oxonine is an unsaturated heterocycle of nine atoms, with an oxygen replacing a carbon at one position. Oxonine is a nonaromatic compound.

== See also ==
- Azonine
- Furan
- Cyclononatetraene
- Oxepin
- Thionine
