= Thionine (disambiguation) =

- Thionin: a protein.
- Thionine: an organic dye.
- (2Z,4Z,6Z,8Z)-Thionine: a simple heterocycle compound.
