= Oxazole =

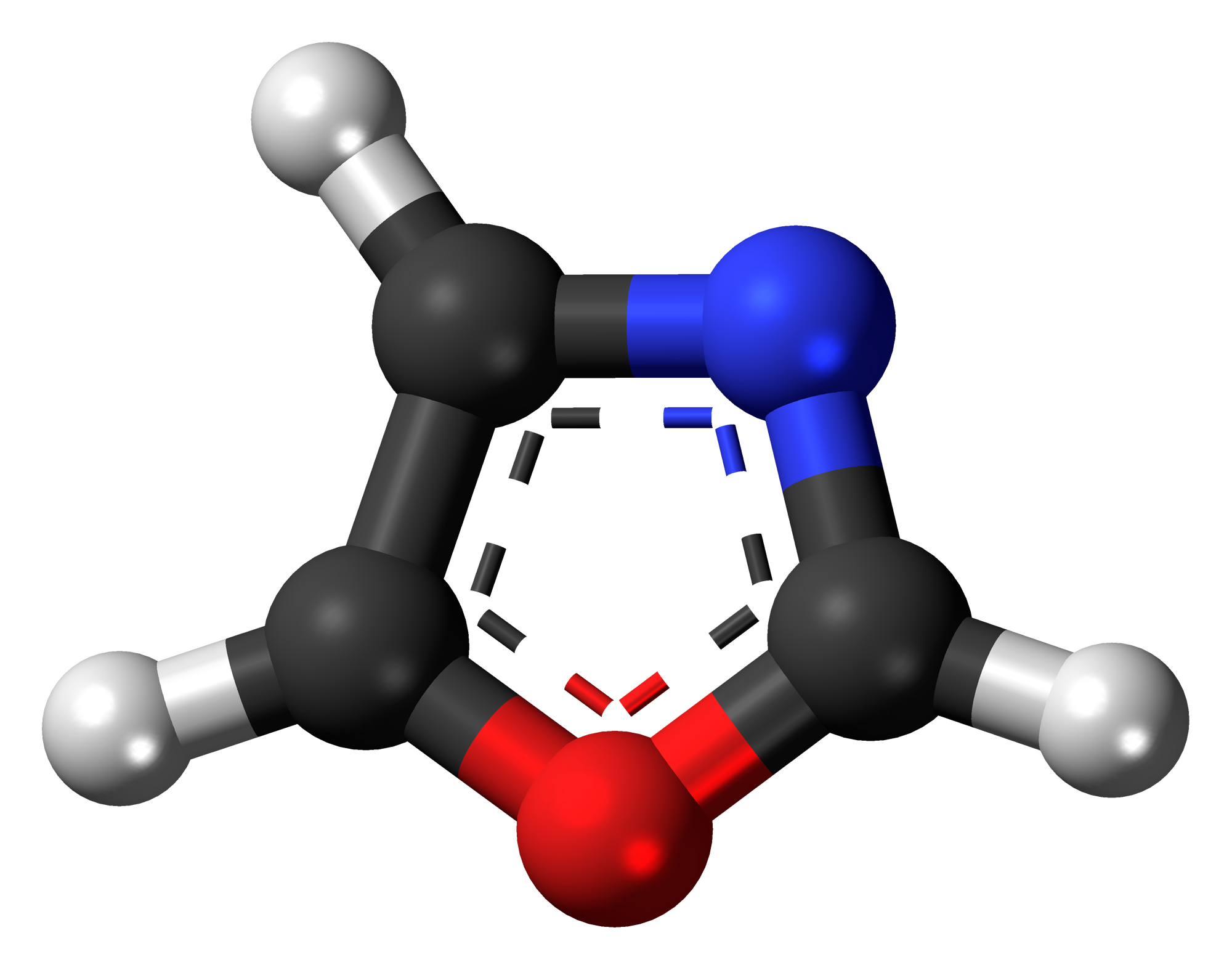

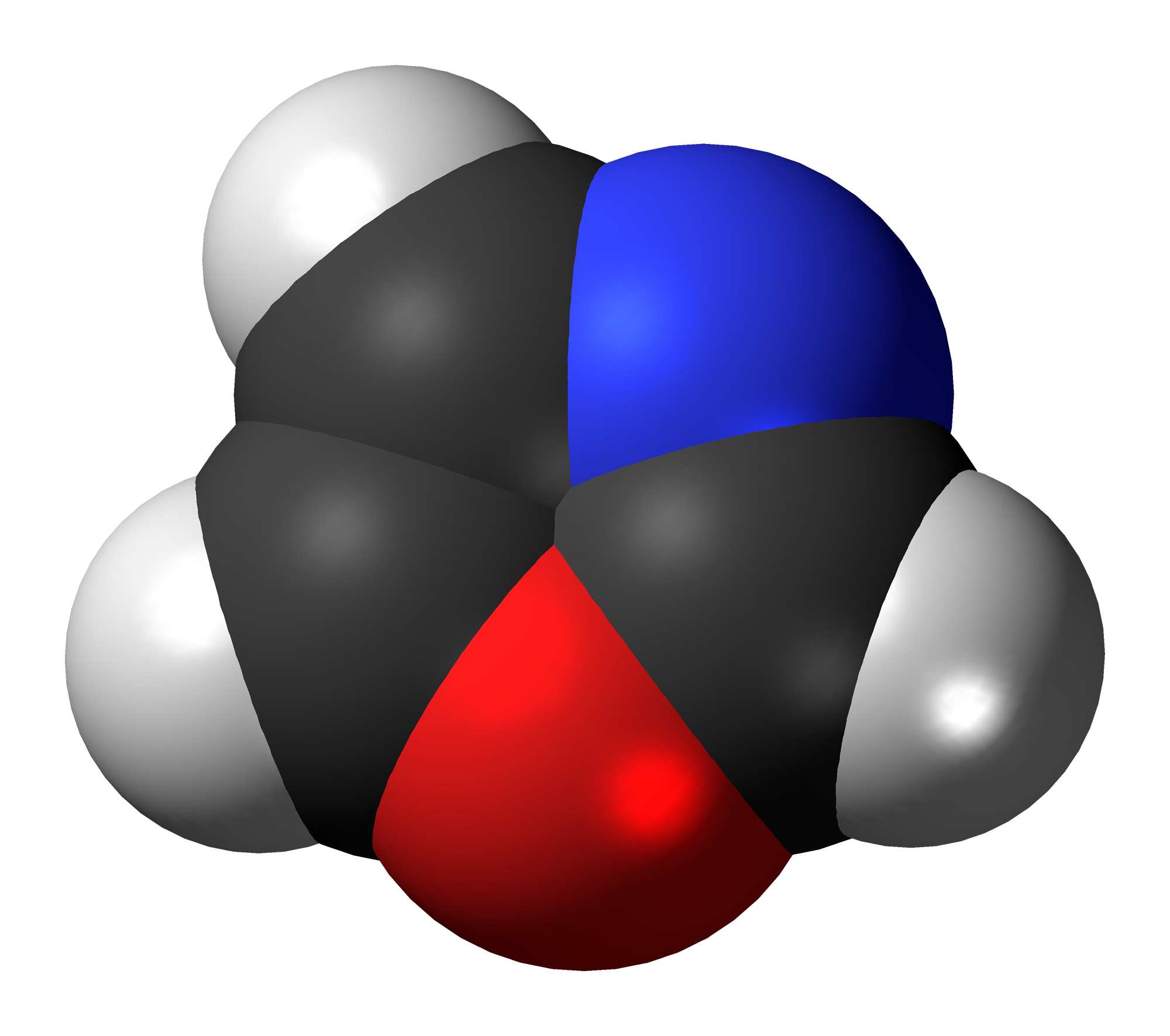

Names
- Preferred IUPAC name 1,3-Oxazole

Identifiers
CAS Number	288-42-6
3D model (JSmol)	Interactive image
Beilstein Reference	103851
ChEBI	CHEBI:35597
ChEMBL	ChEMBL2171710
ChemSpider	8898
ECHA InfoCard	100.005.474
EC Number	206-020-8
Gmelin Reference	485850
MeSH	D010080
PubChem CID	9255
UNII	FJZ20I1LPS
CompTox Dashboard (EPA)	DTXSID70182983
- InChI: InChI=1S/C3H3NO/c1-2-5-3-4-1/h1-3H Key: ZCQWOFVYLHDMMC-UHFFFAOYSA-N; InChI=1/C3H3NO/c1-2-5-3-4-1/h1-3H Key: ZCQWOFVYLHDMMC-UHFFFAOYAD
- SMILES: C1=COC=N1

Properties
Chemical formula	C_{3}H_{3}NO
Molar mass	69.06 g/mol
Density	1.050 g/cm^{3}
Boiling point	69.5 °C (157.1 °F; 342.6 K)
Acidity (pK_{a})	0.8 (of conjugate acid)

Hazards
- GHS labelling
Pictograms	(GHS02: Flammable) (GHS05: Corrosive)
Signal word	Danger
Hazard statements	H225, H318
Precautionary statements	P210, P233, P240, P241, P242, P243, P264+P265, P280, P303+P361+P353, P305+P354+P338, P317, P370+P378, P403+P235, P501

Supplementary data page
- Oxazole (data page)
- Except where otherwise noted, data are given for materials in their standard state (at 25 °C [77 °F], 100 kPa). verify (what is ?) Infobox references

Oxazole is the parent compound for a vast class of heterocyclic aromatic organic compounds. These are azoles with an oxygen and a nitrogen separated by one carbon. Oxazoles are aromatic compounds but less so than the thiazoles. Oxazole is a weak base; its conjugate acid has a pK_{a} of 0.8, compared to 7 for imidazole.

== Preparation ==
The classic synthetic route the Robinson–Gabriel synthesis by dehydration of 2-acylaminoketones:

The Robinson–Gabriel synthesis

The Fischer oxazole synthesis from cyanohydrins and aldehydes is also widely used:

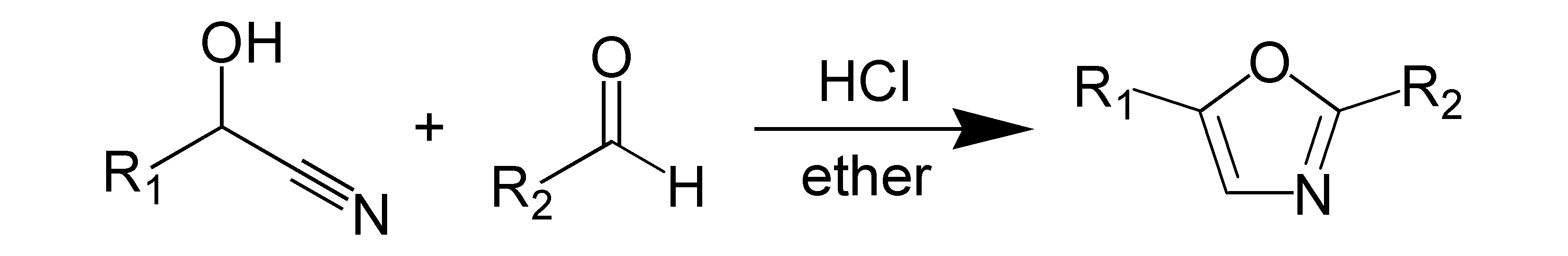
Fischer Oxazole Synthesis

Other methods are known including the reaction of α-haloketones and formamide and the Van Leusen reaction with aldehydes and TosMIC.

== Biosynthesis ==
In biomolecules, oxazoles result from the cyclization and oxidation of serine or threonine nonribosomal peptides:

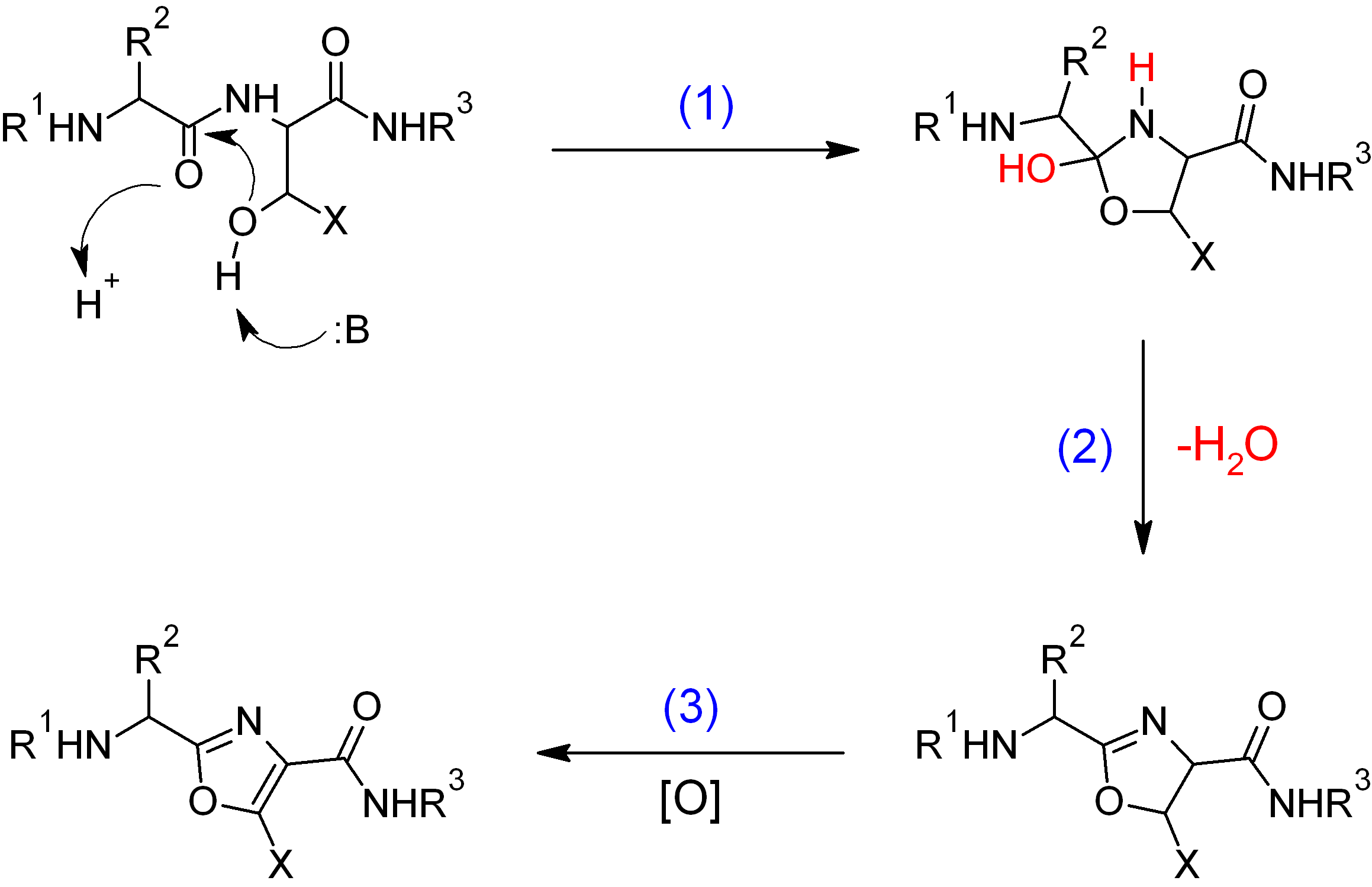
Where X = H, CH_{3} for serine and threonine respectively, B = base. (1) Enzymatic cyclization. (2) Elimination. (3) [O] = enzymatic oxidation.

Oxazoles are not as abundant in biomolecules as the related thiazoles with oxygen replaced by a sulfur atom.

== Reactions ==
With a pK_{a} of 0.8 for the conjugate acid (oxazolium salts), oxazoles are far less basic than imidazoles (pK_{a} = 7). Deprotonation of oxazoles occurs at C2, and the lithio salt exists in equilibrium with the ring-opened enolate-isonitrile, which can be trapped by silylation. Formylation with dimethylformamide gives 2-formyloxazole.

Electrophilic aromatic substitution takes place at C5, but requiring electron donating groups.

Nucleophilic aromatic substitution takes place with leaving groups at C2.

Diels–Alder reactions involving oxazole (as dienes) and electrophilic alkenes has been well developed as a route to pyridines. In this way, alkoxy-substituted oxazoles serve a precursors to the pyridoxyl system, as found in vitamin B6. The initial cycloaddition affords a bicyclic intermediate, with an acid-sensitive oxo bridgehead.

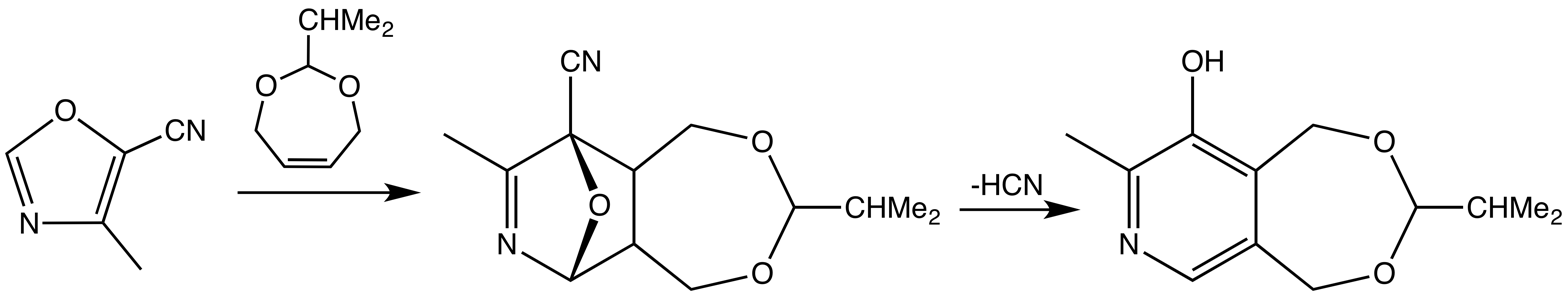
Use of an oxazole in the synthesis of a precursor to pyridoxine, which is converted to vitamin B6.

In the Cornforth rearrangement of 4-acyloxazoles is a thermal rearrangement reaction with the organic acyl residue and the C5 substituent changing positions.

- Various oxidation reactions. One study reports on the oxidation of 4,5-diphenyloxazole with 3 equivalents of CAN to the corresponding imide and benzoic acid:

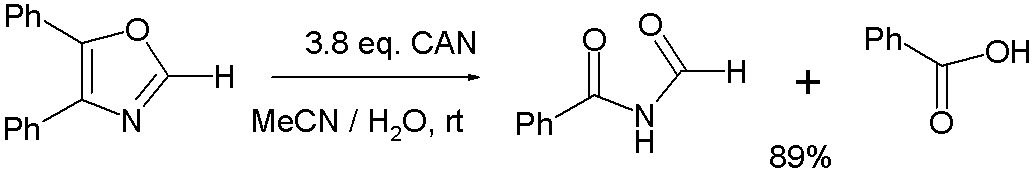
In the balanced half-reaction three equivalents of water are consumed for each equivalent of oxazoline, generating 4 protons and 4 electrons (the latter derived from Ce^{IV}).

== See also ==
- Isoxazole, an analog with the nitrogen atom in position 2.
- Thiazole, an analog with the oxygen replaced by a sulfur.
- Benzoxazole, where the oxazole is fused to a benzene ring.
- Oxazoline, which has one double bond reduced.
- Oxazolidine, which has both double bonds reduced.
- Oxazolone, an analog with a carbonyl group

== Additional reading ==
- Fully Automated Continuous Flow Synthesis of 4,5-Disubstituted Oxazoles Marcus Baumann, Ian R. Baxendale, Steven V. Ley, Christoper D. Smith, and Geoffrey K. Tranmer Org. Lett.; 2006; 8(23) pp 5231 - 5234. doi:10.1021/ol061975c
