= (2Z,4Z,6Z,8Z)-Thionine =

Names
- Preferred IUPAC name (2Z,4Z,6Z,8Z)-Thionine
- Other names Thionine; Thionin

Identifiers
3D model (JSmol)	Interactive image
ChemSpider	10605791
PubChem CID	13287583
CompTox Dashboard (EPA)	DTXSID801045924
- InChI: InChI=1S/C8H8S/c1-2-4-6-8-9-7-5-3-1/h1-8H Key: KUUVQVSHGLHAKZ-UHFFFAOYSA-N
- SMILES: C1=CC=CSC=CC=C1

Properties
Chemical formula	C_{8}H_{8}S
Molar mass	136.21 g·mol^{−1}
- Except where otherwise noted, data are given for materials in their standard state (at 25 °C [77 °F], 100 kPa). Infobox references

(2Z,4Z,6Z,8Z)-Thionine or thionine is an unsaturated heterocycle of nine atoms, with a sulfur atom replacing carbon at one position. Thionine is a partially aromatic compound.

== See also ==
- Azonine
- Thiepine
- Cyclononatetraene
- Thiophene
- Oxonine
