= Fischer oxazole synthesis =

Chemical reaction

Named after	Hermann Emil Fischer
Reaction type	Ring forming reaction

The Fischer oxazole synthesis is a chemical synthesis of an oxazole from a cyanohydrin and an aldehyde in the presence of anhydrous hydrochloric acid. This method was discovered by Emil Fischer in 1896. The cyanohydrin itself is derived from a separate aldehyde. The reactants of the oxazole synthesis itself, the cyanohydrin of an aldehyde and the other aldehyde itself, are usually present in equimolar amounts. Both reactants usually have an aromatic group, which appear at specific positions on the resulting heterocycle.

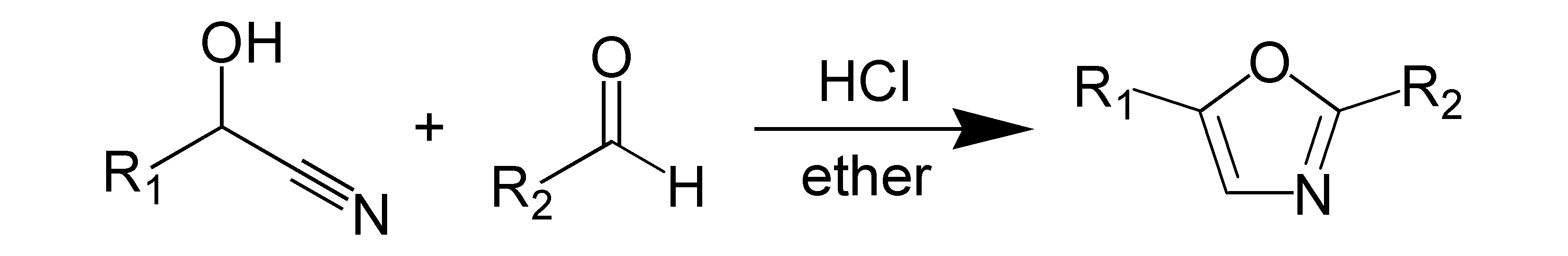
Fischer Oxazole Synthesis

A more specific example of Fischer oxazole synthesis involves reacting mandelic acid nitrile with benzaldehyde to give 2,5-diphenyl-oxazole.

== History ==
Fischer developed the Fischer oxazole synthesis during his time at Berlin University. The Fischer oxazole synthesis was one of the first syntheses developed to produce 2,5-disubstituted oxazoles.

== Mechanism ==
The Fischer oxazole synthesis is a type of dehydration reaction which can occur under mild conditions in a rearrangement of the groups that would not seem possible. The reaction occurs by dissolving the reactants in dry ether and passing through the solution dry, gaseous hydrogen chloride. The product, which is the 2,5-disubstituted oxazole, precipitates as the hydrochloride and can be converted to the free base by the addition of water or by boiling with alcohol.

The cyanohydrins and aldehydes used for the synthesis are usually aromatic, however there have been instances where aliphatic compounds have been used. The first step of the mechanism is the addition of gaseous HCl to the cyanohydrin 1. The cyanohydrin abstracts the hydrogen from HCl while the chloride ion attacks the carbon in the cyano group. This first step results in the formation of an iminochloride intermediate 2, probably as the hydrochloride salt. This intermediate then reacts with the aldehyde; the lone pair of the nitrogen attacks the electrophilic carbonyl carbon on the aldehyde.

The following step results in an S_{N}2 attack followed by the loss water to give a chloro-oxazoline intermediate 4. Next is the tautomerization of the a ring proton. The last step involves an elimination and the loss of an HCl molecule to form the product 5, which is the 2,5-diaryloxazole.

Mechanism of Fischer oxazol synthesis

== Applications ==
Diarylazoles are common structural motifs in both natural products and drug candidates, however they are difficult to synthesize. Diaryloxazoles are generally prepared through the Fischer oxazole synthesis or Robinson-Gabriel synthesis, where the oxazole ring is constructed via either synthesis.

The Fischer oxazole synthesis has also been useful in the synthesis of 2-(4-Bromophenyl)5-phenyloxazole starting with benzaldehyde cyanohydrin and 4-bromobenzaldehyde. However, oxazole ring chlorination occurs to give 2,5-bis(4-bromophenyl)-4-chlorooxazole 7 along with 2,5-bis(4-bromophenyl)-4-oxazolidinone 8. The latter compound is in general a by-product.

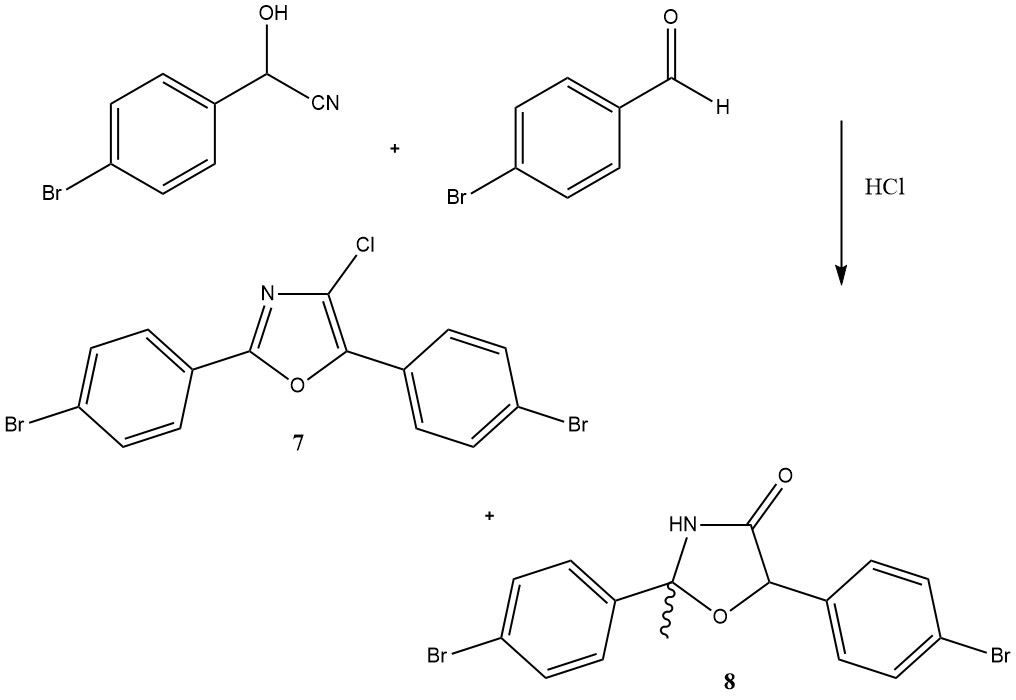
Example of a Fischer Oxazole Synthesis

Another useful example is the one pot two-step synthesis of halfordinol, a parent compound for Rutaceae alkaloids. The initial steps follow the Fischer oxazole synthesis, although the acid-catalyzed cyclization occurs in two steps rather than one, which ensures the formation of the di-chloro intermediate, preventing formation of the regioisomer.

Harfordinal

In recent research, a reconsideration of the Fischer oxazole synthesis has led to the synthesis of 2,5-disubstituted oxazoles from aldehydes and α-hydroxy-amides. However, unlike the Fischer oxazole synthesis, the new method is not limited to diaryloxazoles.
