= Azonine =

Names
- Preferred IUPAC name (2Z,4Z,6Z,8Z)-1H-Azonine

Identifiers
CAS Number	293-57-2
3D model (JSmol)	Interactive image
ChemSpider	10417810
PubChem CID	13287582
CompTox Dashboard (EPA)	DTXSID90534844
- InChI: InChI=1S/C8H9N/c1-2-4-6-8-9-7-5-3-1/h1-9H Key: HWGJWYNMDPTGTD-UHFFFAOYSA-N
- SMILES: C1=CC=CNC=CC=C1

Properties
Chemical formula	C_{8}H_{9}N
Molar mass	119.167 g·mol^{−1}
- Except where otherwise noted, data are given for materials in their standard state (at 25 °C [77 °F], 100 kPa). Infobox references

Azonine is an unsaturated heterocycle of nine atoms, with a nitrogen atom replacing carbon at one position. A variety of derivatives have been synthesized. It possesses a considerable amount of aromatic stability. It and the anion of cyclononatetraene, C_{9}H_{9}^{–}, are the largest monocyclic all-cis ring systems to be aromatic and close to planar. Due to a balance between angle strain (~20°) and aromaticity, a planar conformation and distorted conformation are very close in energy and the two are observable as an equilibrium mixture in the solution phase in acetone. Furthermore, the presence of substituents or nearby cations strongly influences the conformation.

== See also ==
- Azepine
- Pyrrole
- Cyclononatetraene
- Thionine
- Oxonine
