= Cornforth rearrangement =

Reaction in organic chemistry

In organic chemistry, the Cornforth rearrangement is a rearrangement reaction of a 4-acyloxazole in which the group attached to an acyl on position 4 and the substituent on position 5 of an oxazole ring exchange places. It was first reported in 1949, and is named for John Cornforth. The reaction is used in the synthesis of amino acids, where the corresponding oxazoles occur as intermediates.

== Overview ==
In the original work, Cornforth used 5-ethoxy-2-phenyloxazole-4-carboxamide (R^{1} = phenyl, R^{2} = ethoxy, R^{3} = amino).

Cornforth rearrangement overall reaction

The reaction also works, however, with a large number of other carbonyl-substituted 1,3-oxazoles.

In the early 1970s, the reaction was further researched by Michael Dewar. It was shown that the reaction gave good yields, over 90%, when using nitrogen-containing heterocycles at the R^{3} position.

== Mechanism ==
The mechanism of the Cornforth rearrangement begins by a thermal pericyclic ring opening which furnishes a nitrile intermediate 1, which then undergoes rearrangement to the oxazole, which is isomeric to the starting compound.

Cornforth rearrangement mechanism

The ylide intermediate has several resonance contributors and the stability of said structures affects the outcome of the reaction, since the intermediate will revert to the starting material if the third resonance structure is most stable. Whether the reaction takes place is dependent on the energy difference between the starting material and the product.

Cornforth rearrangement resonance contributors
