= Oxazole (data page) =

Chemical data page

The complete data for Oxazole
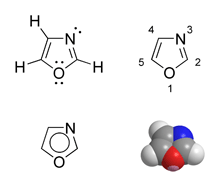
General information
Chemical formula: C_{3}H_{3}NO
Molar mass: 69.06 g·mol^{−1}
Systematic name:
1,3-oxazole ^{a}
Synonyms:
none
Database data
SMILES: C1=COC=N1 ^{b}
InChI=1/C3H3NO/c1-2-5-3-4-1/h1-3H ^{c}

ATC: N/A	CAS: 120-12-7	DrugBank: N/A	EINECS: 206-020-8 ^{d}	PubChem: 9255

Physical properties

Structure	Crystal data	Spectral data: UV-Vis / IR / NMR / MS

Phase behavior	Solid properties T_{m}: -87 - -84 °C	Liquid properties ρ_{liquid}: 1.050 g.cm^{−3} T_{b}: 69 - 70 °C	Gas properties

Hazard properties

MSDS N/A	Main hazards: N/A	NFPA 704	Flash point: N/A	RTECS number: N/A

Chemical properties

XLogP: -0.123 ^{e}	pI:	pK_{a}: 0.8 (of conjugate acid) ^{h}	Tautomers:	Hydrogen bond: donor - 0 ^{f}; acceptor - 2 ^{g}

Pharmacological properties

This box:
- Except where noted otherwise, data relate to Standard temperature and pressure.
- Reliability of data general note.
