= Trofimov reaction =

Chemical Reaction

Named after	Boris Trofimov
Reaction type	Ring forming reaction

In organic chemistry, the Trofimov reaction is a reaction used to synthesize 2,3-disubstituted pyrroles from ketoximes and acetylene using the superbase medium potassium hydroxide and dimethyl sulfoxide. The reaction is named after Boris Trofimov who first reported it in the 1970's.

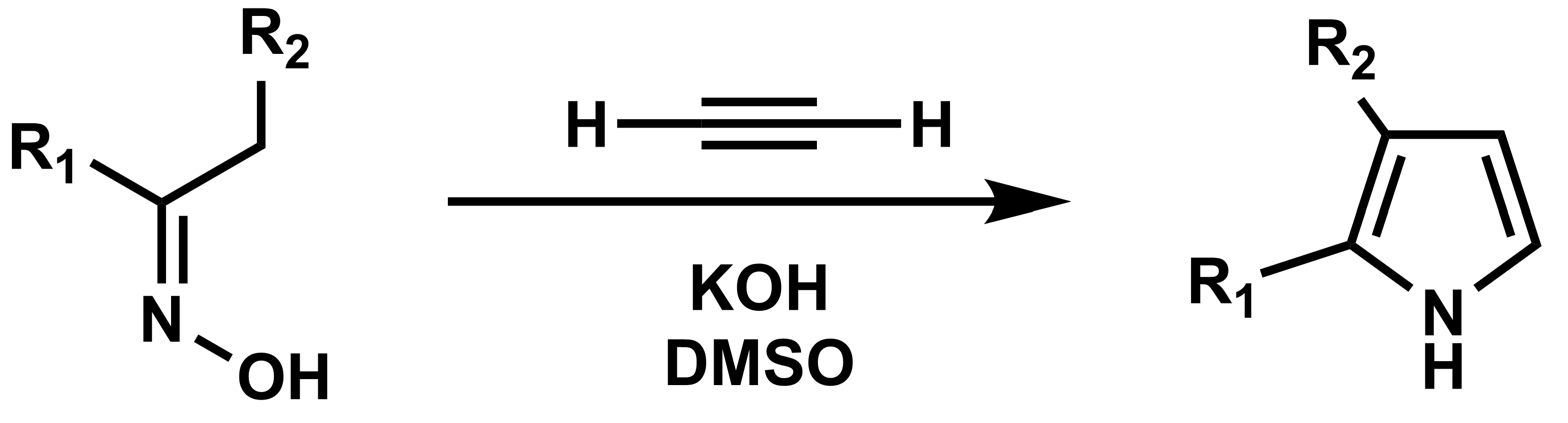

== Mechanism ==
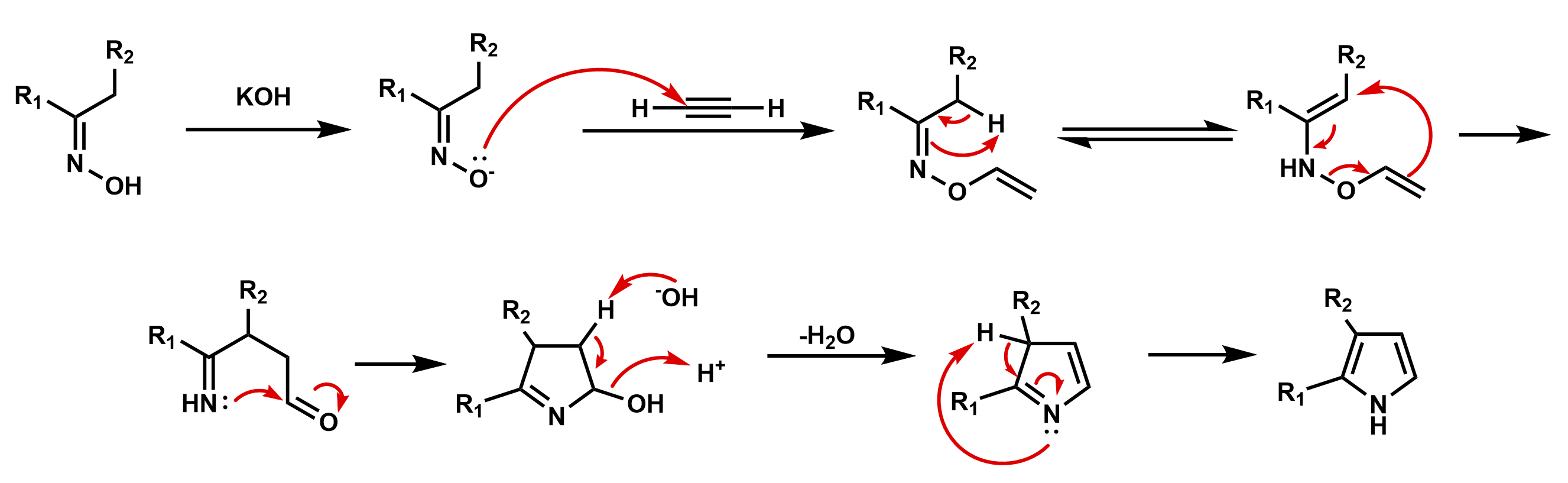

The mechanism begins with the deprotonation of the ketoxime by potassium hydroxide. The negative charge on the oxygen can then attack the acetylene. This forms the O-vinylketoxime which can tautomerize to a vinyl hydroxylamine. The molecule then undergoes a [3,3]-sigmatropic rearrangement to from an aldehyde-imine intermediate. The lone pair on the imine can then attack the carbonyl. Water is then lost forming an alkene. The final pyrrole is then formed by a [1,3] sigmatropic rearrangement.

== Synthetic Applications ==
The Trofimov reaction is a powerful reaction for building pyrroles in total synthesis. The starting ketoxime can be prepared simply by condensing hydroxylamine on a ketone. Starting from a ketone allows for a wide range of starting materials as ketones are one of the most common functional groups in organic chemistry. The condensation reaction can be shown below:

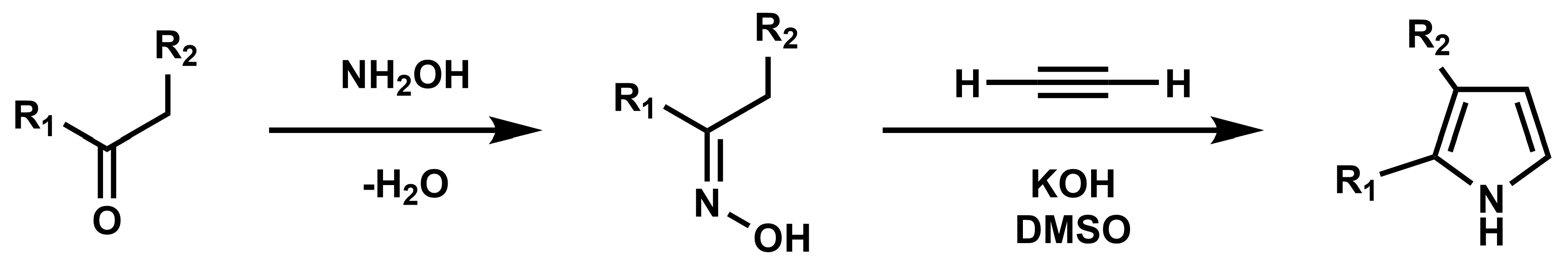

After the condensation, the pyrrole formation can proceed as normal.

The Trofimov reaction can produce both N-H and N-vinyl pyrroles depending on the reaction conditions used. The N-vinyl pyrrole can be formed by the deprotonation of the pyrrole nitrogen which then attacks a second acetylene molecule. In general, higher temperatures, pressures, and higher concentrations of base favor the formation of the N-vinyl product.

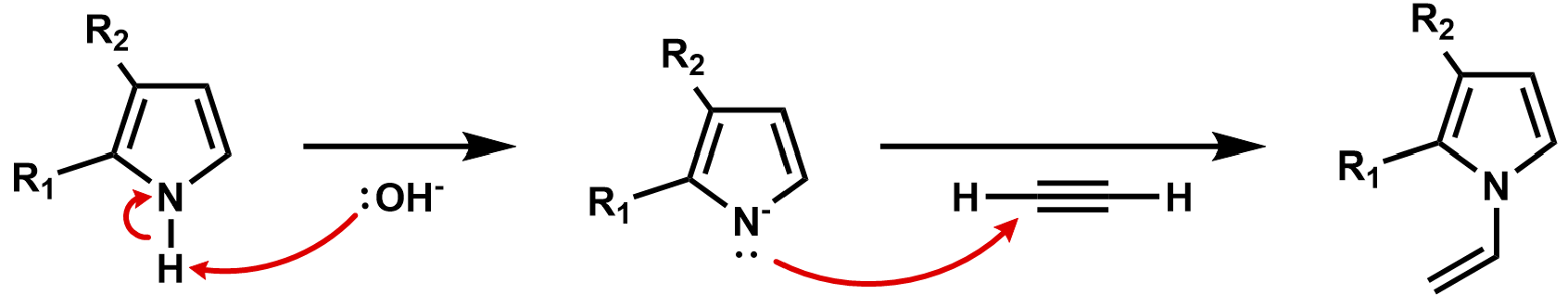

=== Examples ===
The Trofimov reaction was used to build N-vinylpyrrolocholestene. Starting from 5-Cholesten-3-one, hydroxylamine was condensed onto the ketone, forming the intermediate ketoxime. The ketoxime was then reacted with KOH and acetylene in DMSO at high temperature and pressure. Only one regioisomer was observed. In this case, the reaction conditions were sufficient to form the N-vinyl pyrrole

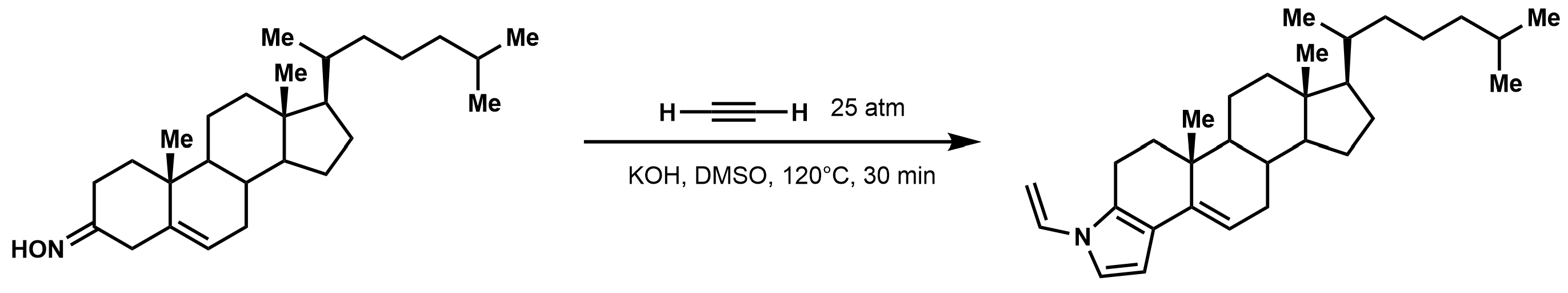

2-mesityl-3-methylpyrrole was synthesized in 2004 via the Trofimov reaction. The reaction of the ketoxime with acetylene yielded a mixture of products with the primary one being the N-H pyrrole. Small amounts of the N-vinyl product were also observed as well as O-vinylketoxime. The N-vinyl product was then used in the synthesis of a new BODIPY.

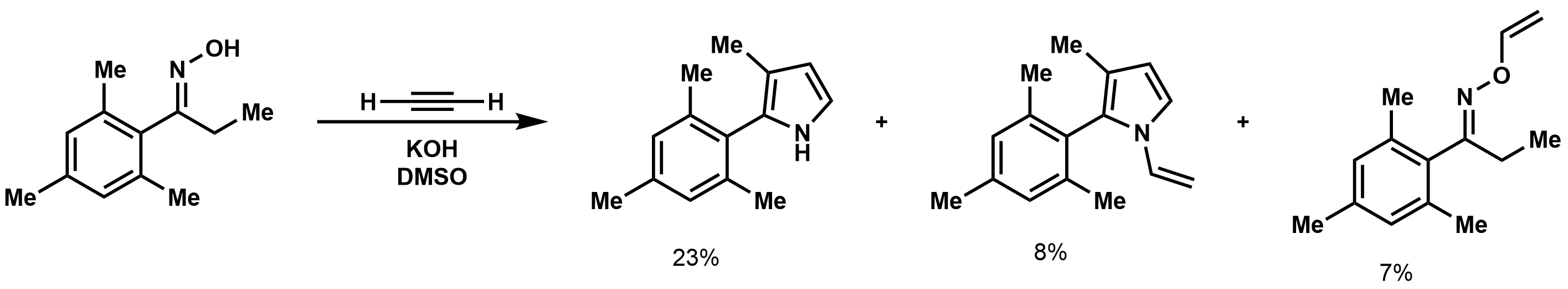

== Variations ==
In 2005 a version of the Trofimov reaction was reported where both the hydroxylamine condensation and pyrrole formation occur in one pot. This variation uses the hydroxylamine HCl salt rather than hydroxylamine and sodium bicarbonate to perform the condensation onto a ketone. After the condensation, the reaction is warmed to 100 °C and the atmosphere in the flask is changed to acetylene. KOH is then added to form the pyrrole.

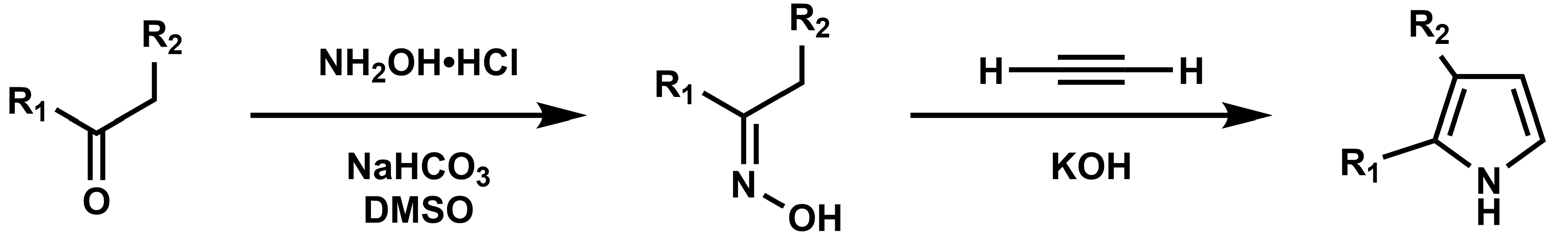
