= TosMIC =

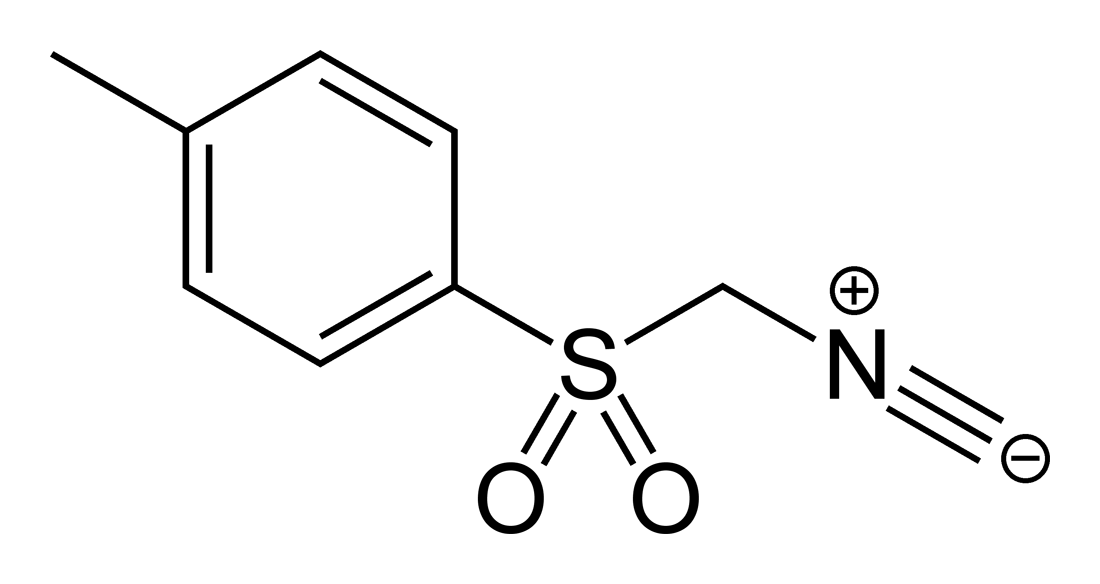

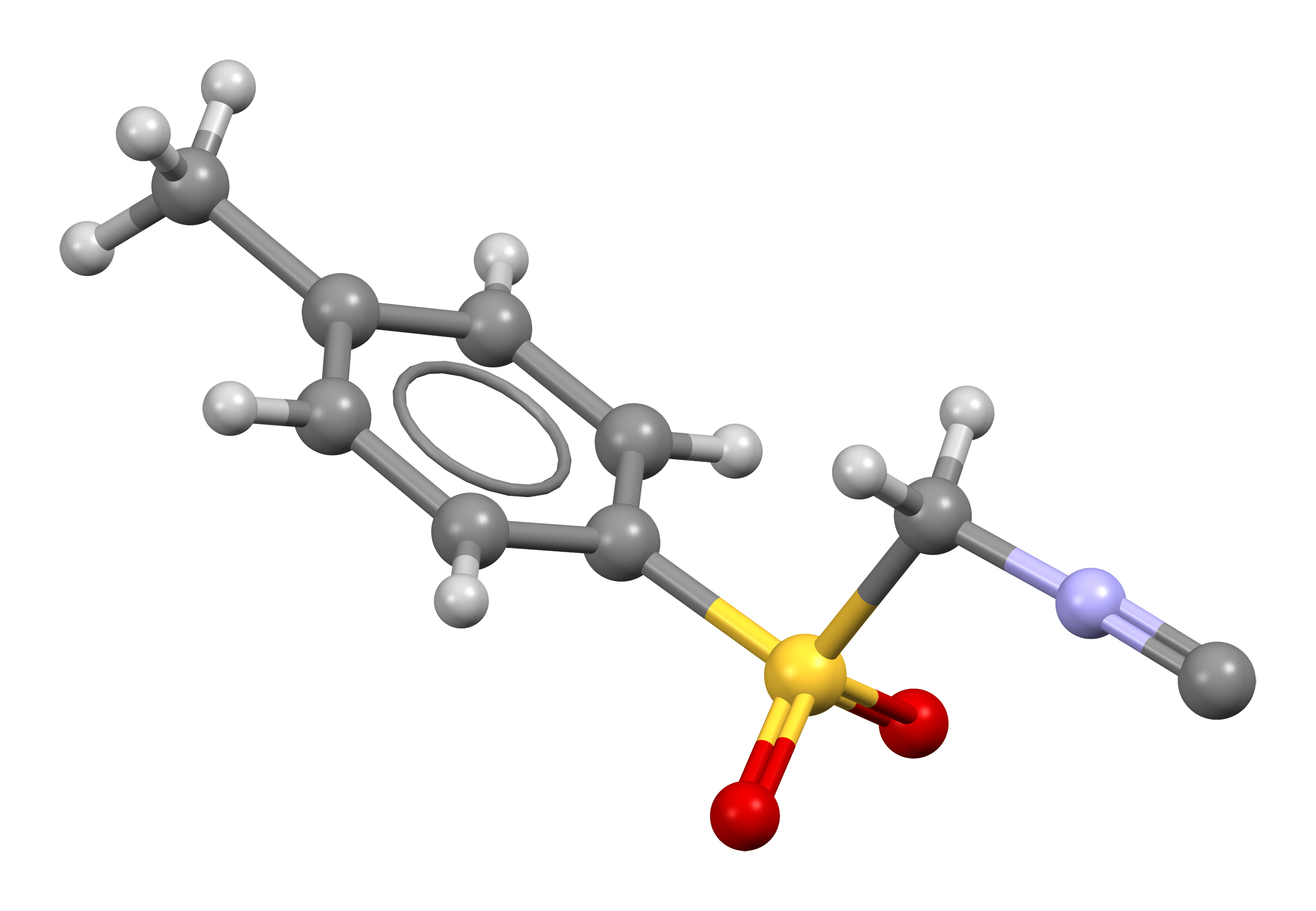

Names
- Preferred IUPAC name 1-(Isocyanomethanesulfonyl)-4-methylbenzene
- Other names Toluenesulfonylmethyl isocyanide

Identifiers
CAS Number	36635-61-7
3D model (JSmol)	Interactive image
ChemSpider	142204
ECHA InfoCard	100.048.293
EC Number	36635-61-7
PubChem CID	161915
UNII	C35FD6OLH8
CompTox Dashboard (EPA)	DTXSID90190101
- InChI: InChI=1S/C9H9NO2S/c1-8-3-5-9(6-4-8)13(11,12)7-10-2/h3-6H,7H2,1H3 Key: CFOAUYCPAUGDFF-UHFFFAOYSA-N; InChI=1/C9H9NO2S/c1-8-3-5-9(6-4-8)13(11,12)7-10-2/h3-6H,7H2,1H3 Key: CFOAUYCPAUGDFF-UHFFFAOYAC
- SMILES: O=S(=O)(c1ccc(cc1)C)C[N+]#[C-]

Properties
Chemical formula	C_{9}H_{9}NO_{2}S
Molar mass	195.24 g·mol^{−1}
Melting point	109 to 113 °C (228 to 235 °F; 382 to 386 K)

Hazards
- GHS labelling
Pictograms	(GHS06: Toxic)
Signal word	Danger
Hazard statements	H300+H310+H330
Precautionary statements	P260, P262, P264, P270, P271, P280, P284, P301+P310+P330, P302+P350, P304+P340+P310, P362, P403+P233, P405, P501
NFPA 704 (fire diamond)	3 1 1
- NIOSH (US health exposure limits)
PEL (Permissible)	5 mg/m^{3} (TWA)
IDLH (Immediate danger)	25 mg/m^{3}
- Except where otherwise noted, data are given for materials in their standard state (at 25 °C [77 °F], 100 kPa). verify (what is ?) Infobox references

TosMIC (toluenesulfonylmethyl isocyanide) is an organic compound with the formula CH_{3}C_{6}H_{4}SO_{2}CH_{2}NC. The molecule contains both sulfonyl and isocyanide groups. It is a colourless solid that, unlike many isocyanides, is odorless. It is prepared by dehydration of the related formamide derivative. It is used to convert ketones to nitriles (Van Leusen reaction) and in the preparation of oxazoles and imidazoles. The versatility of TosMIC in organic synthesis has been documented. It is a fairly strong carbon acid, with an estimated pK_{a} of 14 (compared to 29 for methyl tolyl sulfone), the isocyano group acting as an electron acceptor of strength comparable to an ester group. TosMIC has also been used as a ligand in transition metal complexes due to the ligating nature of its isocyanide group.
