= Van Leusen reaction =

Chemical reaction

Named after	Daan Van Leusen; Albert M. Van Leusen
Reaction type	Substitution reaction

Reaction
ketone
+
TosMIC
↓
nitrile

Identifiers
Organic Chemistry Portal	van-leusen-reaction

The Van Leusen reaction is the reaction of a ketone with TosMIC leading to the formation of a nitrile. It was first described in 1977 by Van Leusen and co-workers. When aldehydes are employed, the Van Leusen reaction is particularly useful to form oxazoles and imidazoles.

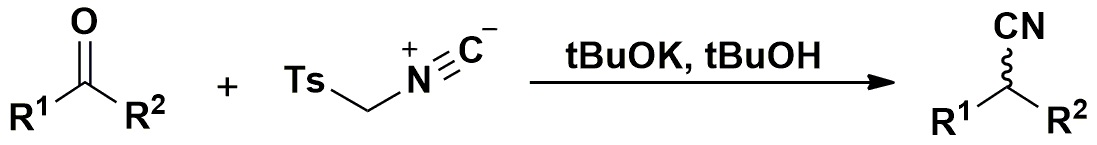
drawing of the van leusen reaction

== Mechanism ==
The reaction mechanism consists of the initial deprotonation of TosMIC, which is facile thanks to the electron-withdrawing effect of both sulfone and isocyanide groups. Attack onto the carbonyl is followed by 5-endo-dig cyclisation (following Baldwin's rules) into a 5-membered ring.

Van Leusen oxazole synthesis
Named after	Daan Van Leusen; Albert M. Van Leusen
Reaction type	Ring forming reaction

Reaction
aldehyde
↓
oxazole

Identifiers
Organic Chemistry Portal	van-leusen-oxazole-synthesis

If the substrate is an aldehyde, then elimination of the tosyl leaving group can occur readily. Upon quenching, the resulting molecule is an oxazole.

Van Leusen imidazole synthesis
Named after	Daan Van Leusen; Albert M. Van Leusen
Reaction type	Ring forming reaction

Identifiers
Organic Chemistry Portal	van-leusen-imidazole-synthesis

If an aldimine is used, formed from the condensation of an aldehyde with an amine, then imidazoles can be generated through the same process.

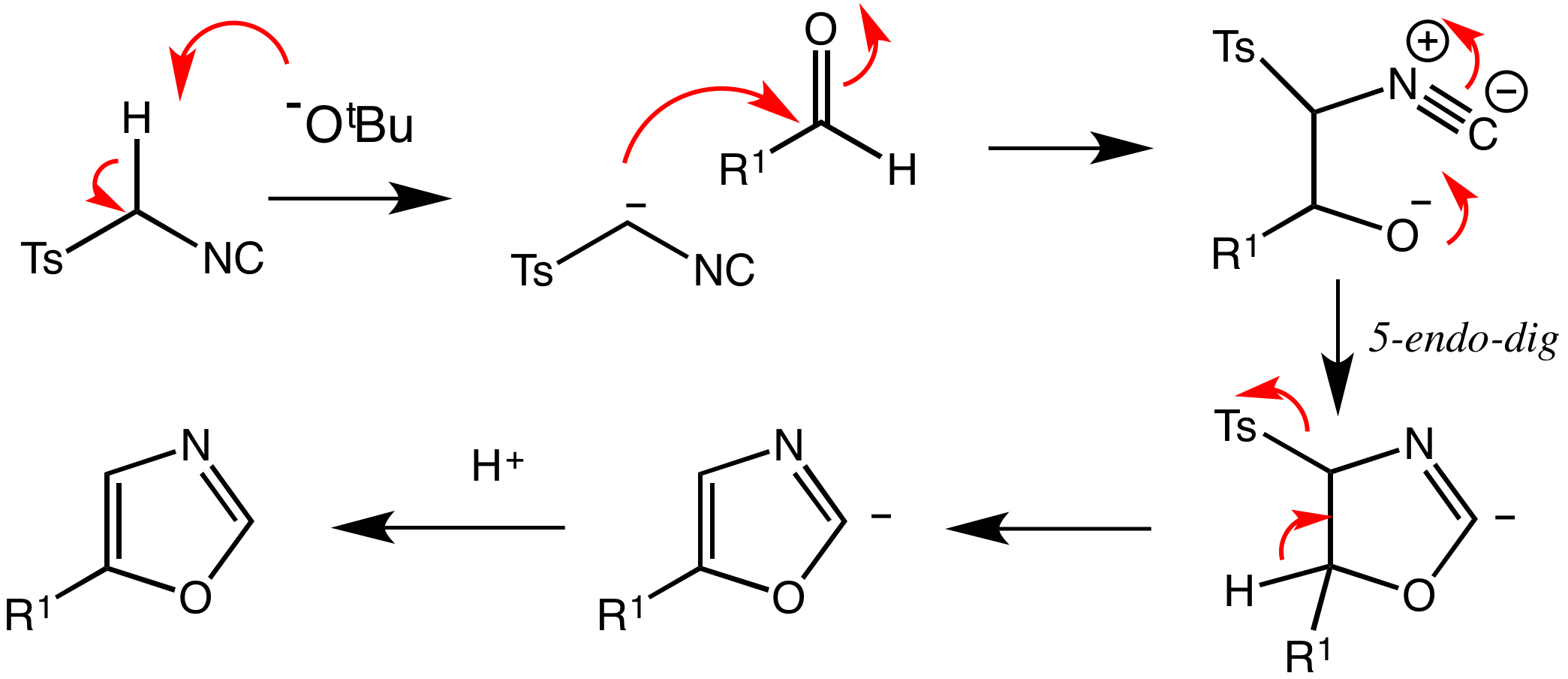
Mechanism showing the synthesis of an oxazole through the Van Leusen reaction

When ketones are used instead, elimination cannot occur; rather, a tautomerization process gives an intermediate which after a ring opening process and elimination of the tosyl group forms an N-formylated alkeneimine. This is then solvolysed by an acidic alcohol solution to give the nitrile product.

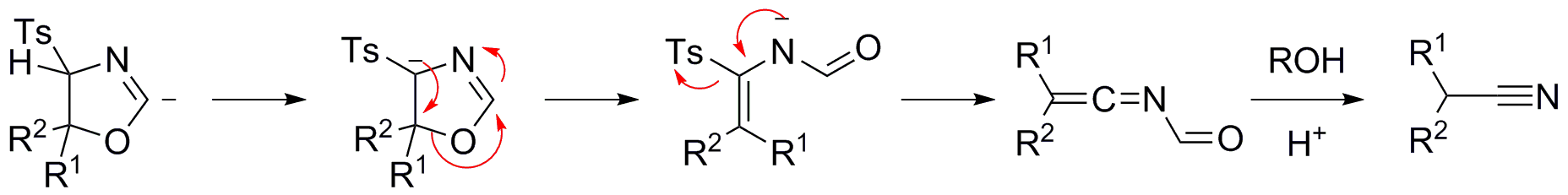
Mechanism for the Van Lausen reaction
