= Cyclononatetraene =

Names
- IUPAC name Cyclonona-1,3,5,7-tetraene

Identifiers
CAS Number	7129-70-6
3D model (JSmol)	Interactive image
ChemSpider	11341386
PubChem CID	12543719
UNII	YMP9FA5CNB
CompTox Dashboard (EPA)	DTXSID40499530
- InChI: InChI=1S/C9H10/c1-2-4-6-8-9-7-5-3-1/h1-8H,9H2/b3-1-,4-2-,7-5-,8-6- Key: GORPVKZVZYAFSO-KZPCVFJPSA-N
- SMILES: C\1/C=C\C=C/C=C\C=C1

Properties
Chemical formula	C_{9}H_{10}
Molar mass	118.179 g·mol^{−1}
- Except where otherwise noted, data are given for materials in their standard state (at 25 °C [77 °F], 100 kPa). Infobox references

Cyclononatetraene is an organic compound with the formula C_{9}H_{10}. It was first prepared in 1969 by protonation of the corresponding aromatic anion (described below). It is unstable and isomerizes with a half-life of 50 minutes at room temperature to 3a,7a-dihydro-1H-indene via a thermal 6π disrotatory electrocyclic ring closing. Upon exposure to ultraviolet light, it undergoes a photochemical 8π electrocyclic ring closing to give cis-bicyclo[6.1.0]nona-2,4,6-triene.

== Cyclononatetraenyl anion ==
Cyclononatetraenyl anion is a 10π aromatic system. Two isomers of the cyclononatetraenyl anion are known: the trans,cis,cis,cis isomer ("Pac-Man"-shaped) and the all-cis isomer (a convex enneagon). The former is less stable and isomerizes to the latter upon warming from –40 °C to room temperature.

The all-cis isomer of C_{9}H_{9}^{−} can be prepared by treatment of 9-chlorobicyclo[6.1.0]nona-2,4,6-triene (1) with lithium or potassium metal. Despite the ring strain resulting from having C–C–C bond angles of 140° instead of the ideal 120° for sp^{2} carbon, this species is believed to be planar and to possess D_{9h} symmetry. The lithium salt was found to react with cyclopentadiene to give lithium cyclopentadienide, showing that cyclononatetraene is a weaker acid than cyclopentadiene.

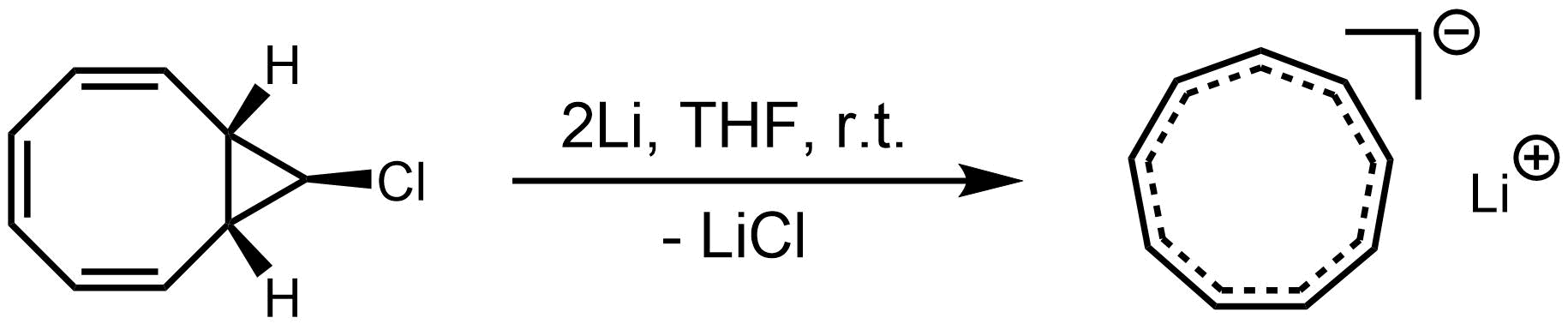

== Cyclononatetraenyl cation ==
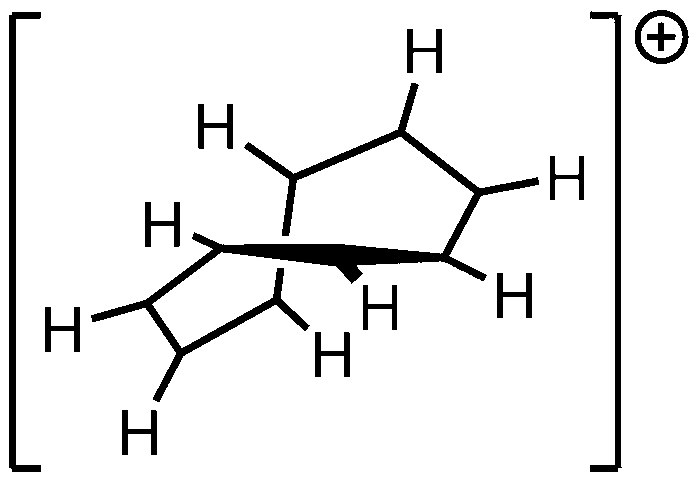
The computed ground-state conformation of C_{9}H^{+}_{9}

Cyclononatetraenyl cation is an 8π system. Its intermediacy is implicated in the solvolysis of 1. The facile solvolysis of 1 suggests that the cation is stabilized. Computation and experimental evidence suggest that C_{9}H^{+}_{9} is a rare example of a ground state species that exhibits Möbius aromaticity. A more recent study, however, suggested that the stability of trans-C_{9}H^{+}_{9} is not much different in energy compared to a Hückel topology isomer. Laser flash photolysis of 1 identified an intermediate, of half-life 1.5 μs, with UV–Vis spectrum matching the computed spectrum of the Hückel isomer, but failed to detect any intermediates with spectrum matching the Möbius isomer.

== See also ==
- Cyclopentadiene
- Cyclooctatetraene
- Cycloheptatriene
- Azonine
