= Triboracyclopropenyl =

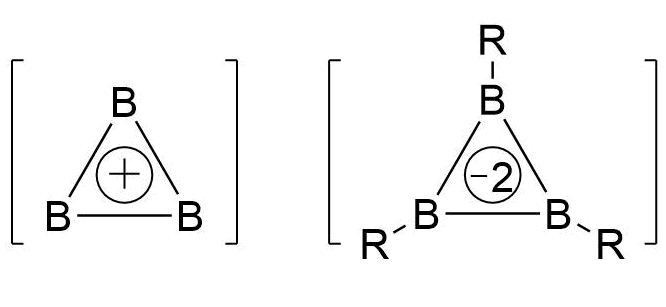
Both the B_{3}^{+} fragment and the B_{3}R_{3}^{2−} fragment (with electron-sharing B−R bonds) are Hückel-aromatic forms of the triboracyclopropenyl fragment.

The triboracyclopropenyl fragment is a cyclic structural motif in boron chemistry, named for its geometric similarity to cyclopropene. In contrast to nonplanar borane clusters that exhibit higher coordination numbers at boron (e.g., through 3-center 2-electron bonds to bridging hydrides or cations), triboracyclopropenyl-type structures are rings of three boron atoms where substituents at each boron are also coplanar to the ring. Triboracyclopropenyl-containing compounds are extreme cases of inorganic aromaticity. They are the lightest and smallest cyclic structures known to display the bonding and magnetic properties that originate from fully delocalized electrons in orbitals of σ and π symmetry. Although three-membered rings of boron are frequently so highly strained as to be experimentally inaccessible, academic interest in their distinctive aromaticity and possible role as intermediates of borane pyrolysis motivated extensive computational studies by theoretical chemists. Beginning in the late 1980s with mass spectrometry work by Anderson et al. on all-boron clusters, experimental studies of triboracyclopropenyls were for decades exclusively limited to gas-phase investigations of the simplest rings (ions of B_{3}). However, more recent work has stabilized the triboracyclopropenyl moiety via coordination to donor ligands or transition metals, dramatically expanding the scope of its chemistry.

== Synthesis ==
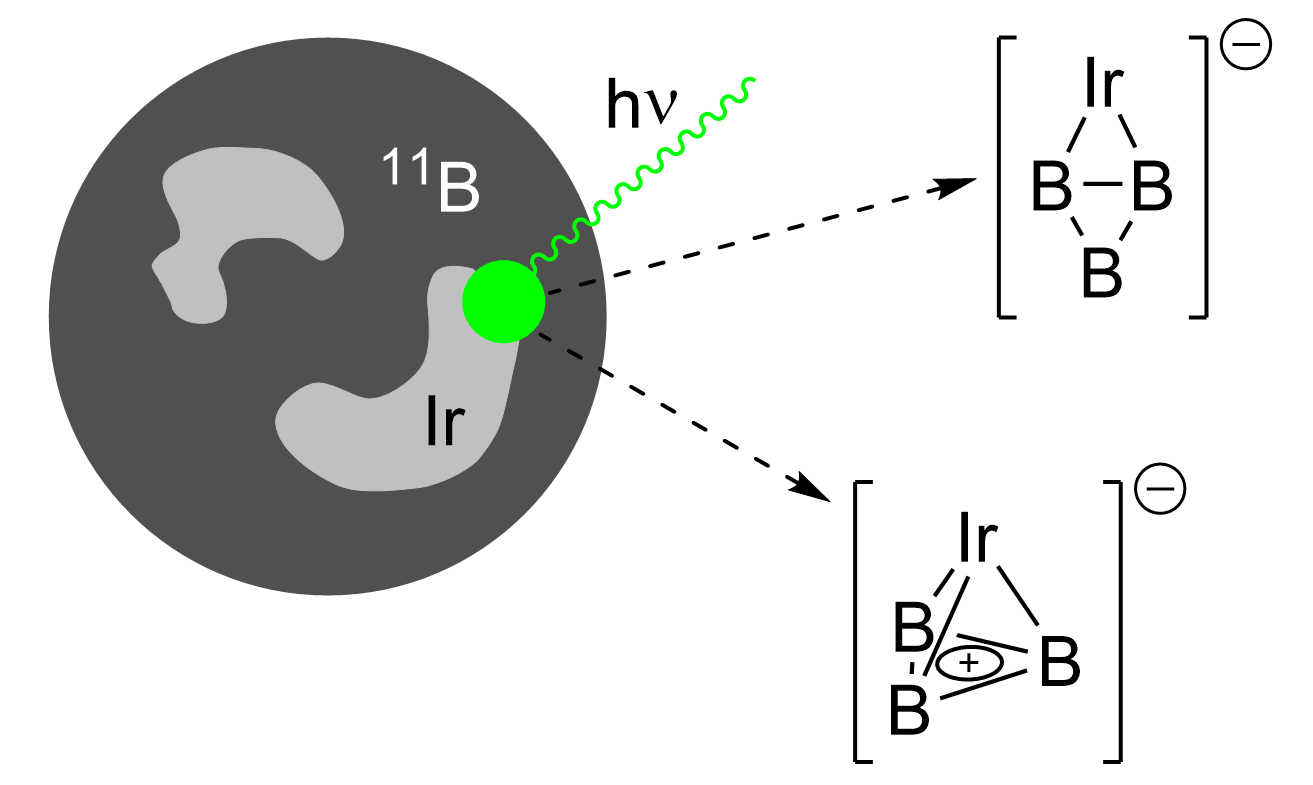
Laser ablation of a mixed target containing iridium and boron generates a cluster beam containing two IrB_{3}^{−} isomers of very similar energy.

For gas-phase spectroscopic studies, triboracyclopropenyl-containing compounds are obtained via laser ablation of boron targets and collimation of the resulting plasma cloud in a flow of inert carrier gas such as helium. The charged molecules of interest are then mass-selected by time-of-flight mass spectrometry. Addition of gases such as N_{2} or CO to the gas stream affords the corresponding adducts, while addition of metals such as iridium and vanadium to the B target yields the corresponding metal-doped clusters.

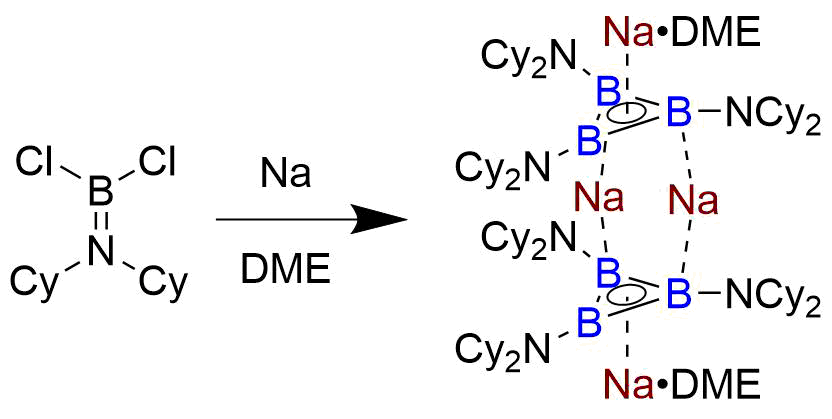
Na_{4}[B_{3}(NCy_{2})_{3}]_{2} • 2 DME is synthesized by direct reduction of a boron precursor.

The sole isolable example of a triboracyclopropenyl anion that persists in solution and in the solid state was identified by Braunschweig and coworkers, who synthesized it by reducing the aminoborane Cl_{2}B=NCy_{2} (Cy = cyclohexyl) with finely dispersed sodium metal in dimethoxyethane (DME). Cooling of the resulting orange-red solution of the dimeric species Na_{4}[B_{3}(NCy_{2})_{3}]_{2} • 2 DME resulted in crystals suitable for X-ray diffraction, by which the structure was determined. Although the detailed reduction mechanism is unknown, it has been suggested that subvalent "R_{2}N−B" intermediates are involved in the formation of such boron clusters.

== Structure and bonding ==
Due to their special status as the simplest aromatic cycles, the electronic structure of triboracyclopropenyl derivatives has been analyzed with a variety of techniques in computational chemistry. These have ranged from canonical molecular orbital theory to alternative formulations of bonding such as adaptive natural density partitioning theory, the quantum theory of atoms in molecules, natural bond orbital theory, natural orbitals for chemical valence and electron localization function analysis. NICS and ring current calculations have also been used to characterize the aromaticity in such systems by using magnetic criteria. In general, the extremely small size of these cycles implies that their bonding electrons experience substantial Coulomb repulsion, resulting in abnormally high ring strain. This effect is partially compensated for by the stabilization offered by aromatic delocalization.

=== B_{3}^{+} ===
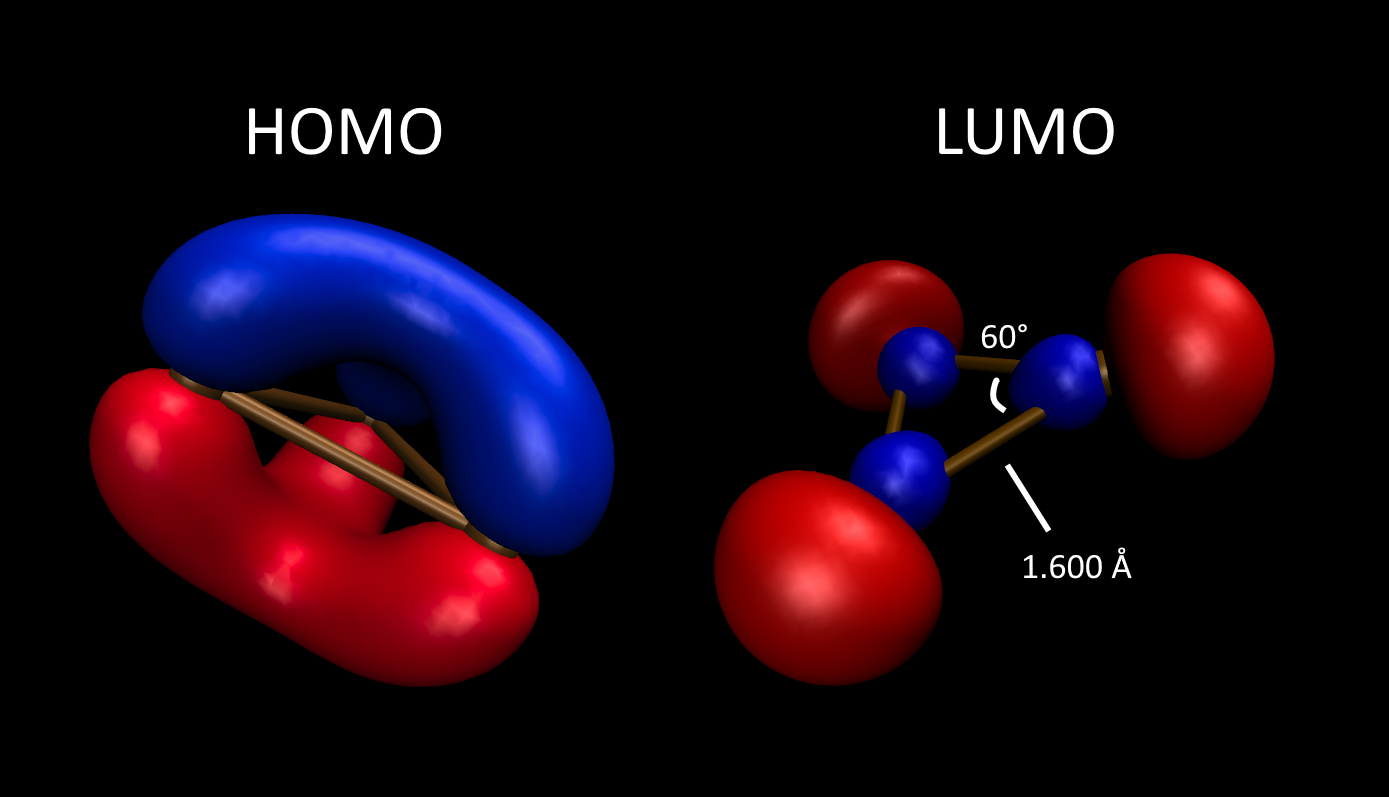
The HOMO and LUMO of B_{3}^{+} display a_{2}'' and a_{1}' symmetry, respectively. Electron occupation of the former conveys π aromaticity, the latter σ aromaticity.

B_{3}^{+} displays π aromaticity associated with its a_{2}''-symmetric HOMO. In its singlet electronic ground state, it is a Hückel 2π electron system analogous to the cyclopropenium cation, but it is too reactive to be isolated. It is triangular, with D_{3h} symmetry - all of its B atoms and B-B bond distances are chemically equivalent. The gas-phase adducts B_{3}(N_{2})_{3}^{+} and B_{3}(CO)_{3}^{+} have been computationally studied through ETS-NOCV (extended transition state - natural orbitals for chemical valence) theory, which dissects the changes in energy and electron density that result as a molecule is prepared from a reference state of noninteracting fragments. ETS-NOCV energy decomposition analysis suggests that the N_{2} and CO adducts are primarily stabilized (by -83.6 and -112.3 kcal/mol respectively) through σ donation of the exocyclic ligands into the highly electron-deficient boron ring. As a result, each was interpreted as a B_{3}^{+} moiety supported by dative bonding from N_{2} or CO. The electron deformation density constructed from the NOCVs of this system, together with charges derived from natural bond orbital populations, indicate electron flow from the exocyclic ligand into the ring, which induces all the equivalent bonds of the B_{3}^{+} core to shorten by approximately 4 pm. π-symmetry interactions are observed with both the weak σ donor N_{2} and the strong π acceptor ligand CO. However, the out-of-plane π backdonation (from the π system of the B_{3} ring to the π acceptor orbitals of each ligand) is less stabilizing than the in-plane π backdonation, with strengths of -26.7 and -19.6 kcal/mol for the [B_{3}(CO)_{2}^{+} + CO] system. This suggests that the minimum-energy configuration of the molecule is one which preserves maximal π aromaticity in the B_{3}^{+} core.

Just as aromatic species like the cyclopentadienyl anion and the cyclopropenium cation can coordinate to transition metals, it was recently demonstrated that the B_{3}^{+} ring can bind to metal centers. Laser ablation of a mixed B/Ir target produces two isomers of IrB_{3}^{−}, a B_{3}^{+} ring coordinated to a formal Ir^{2-} anion. These are a pseudo-planar η^{2} adduct and a tetrahedral η^{3} adduct, the latter of which contains an aromatic triboracyclopropenyl fragment. Both are nearly identical in energy and coexist in the generated cluster beam.

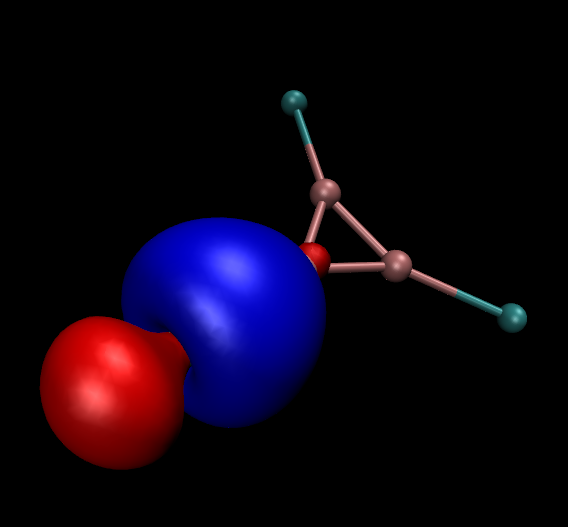
The Natural Bond Orbital corresponding to the sigma bond between B and Ar in B_{3}Ar_{3}^{+}, displaying 82.6% Ar character and 17.4% B character.

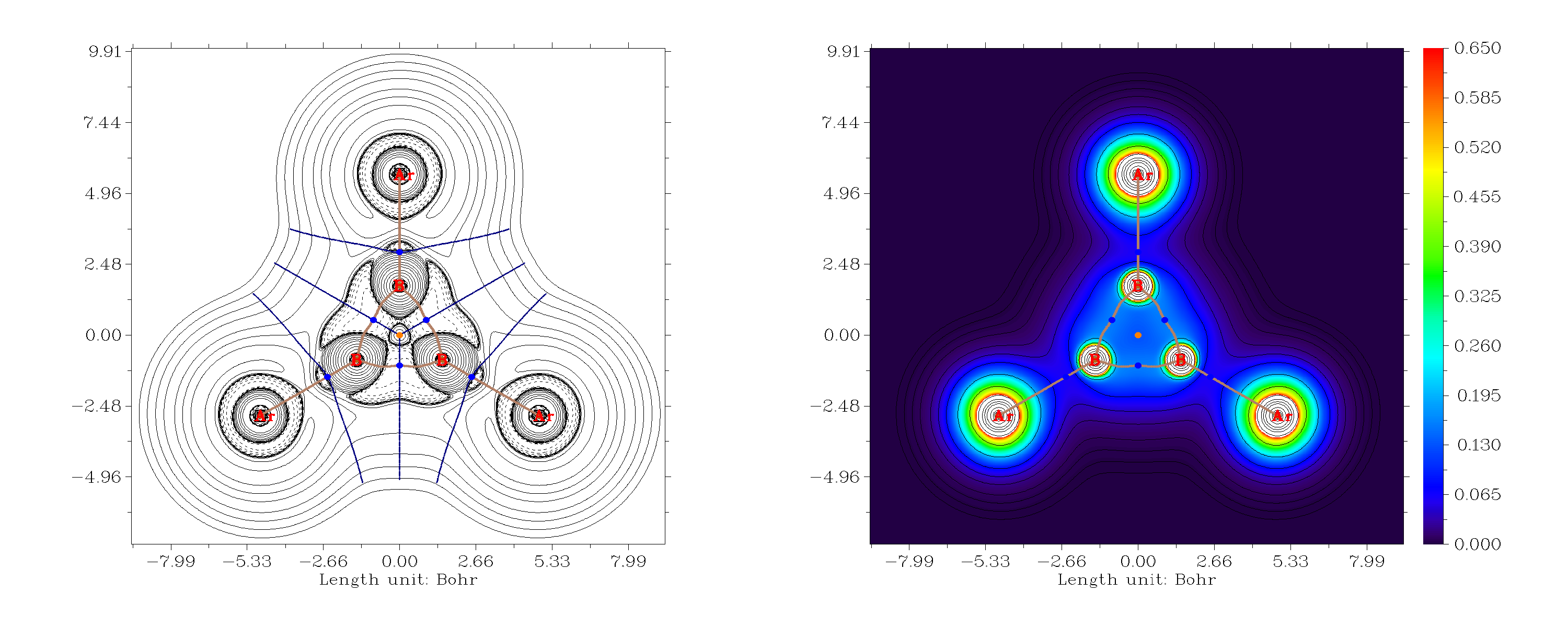
AIM analysis reveals strong polarization of the noble gas Ar in the adduct B_{3}Ar_{3}^{+}. Left: The Laplacian of the electron density distribution. Right: The electron density distribution.

Computations suggest that B_{3}^{+} may even bind inert noble-gas atoms to form an unusual family of compounds B_{3}(Rg)_{3}^{+} (Rg = rare/noble gas), with nonnegligible bond strengths (from 15 to 30 kcal/mol) that originate from Rg p-orbital σ donicity and a significant degree of charge transfer from Rg to B_{3}^{+}. The possibility of new noble-gas compounds that form exothermally and spontaneously is an opportunity for experimental work.

=== B_{3} ===
B_{3} possesses a singly occupied a_{1}' HOMO (a SOMO) that consists of σ-symmetric orbitals oriented toward the core of the ring, associated with σ delocalization and slightly shorter B-B bond lengths as compared to B_{3}^{+}. It is paramagnetic with a doublet ground state. It is nonpolar, flat and triangular, having D_{3h} symmetry.

=== B_{3}^{−} ===
B_{3}^{−}, with a filled a_{1}' HOMO in D_{3h} symmetry, is considered to be "doubly" aromatic and relatively stable - it simultaneously possesses highly delocalized σ and π electrons in its HOMO and HOMO-1 respectively.

=== B_{3}R_{3}^{2-} ===
B_{3}R_{3}^{2-}, formulated with electron-sharing B−R bonds rather than dative arrows, is isoelectronic to B_{3}^{+}. 8 electrons are assigned to the triboracyclopenyl core, 6 in σ bonding orbitals and 2 in the π system, resulting in Hückel aromaticity. The only experimentally characterized compound of this class is Na_{4}[B_{3}(NCy_{2})_{3}]_{2} • 2 DME, a dimer of stacked B_{3}R_{3}^{2-} units which are themselves aromatic. Natural bond orbital analysis indicates that this compound is highly stabilized (by roughly 45 kcal/mol) by a donor-acceptor interaction of localized B−B bond orbitals with corresponding B−N antibonding orbital across the ring, in addition to being bound together by electrostatic attraction to bridging Na^{+} cations identified in the crystal structure. DFT calculations show that the HOMO and HOMO-1 are antisymmetric and symmetric combinations of the π HOMO of an individual ring, respectively - a feature shared with metallocenes. As expected for a species with B−B bonds that have a formal MO bond order of $4/3$, the average B-B bond length of 1.62 Å is closer to those of diborene (R-B=B-R) radical cations than B−B single bonds of roughly 1.75 Å.

== Spectroscopy and spectrometry ==
Triboracyclopropenyl-derived compounds were first identified by their mass-to-charge ratio, as transient species in the mass spectrometry of complex mixtures of cationic boron clusters. Reactive scattering studies with O_{2} soon followed, revealing the relatively strong bonding within light boron clusters. Subsequently, B_{3} was isolated in matrices of frozen noble gases and electron paramagnetic resonance spectra were recorded which confirmed its D_{3h} geometry. Hyperfine coupling of the unpaired electron to the ^{11}B nucleus provided an estimate of 15% s-orbital character for the a_{1}' HOMO. The small and nonpolar B_{3} rings were able to tumble and rotate freely even when confined in the matrix.

In general, triboracyclopropenyl-containing species have been too short-lived and produced in insufficient quantity for transmission-mode infrared spectroscopy. However, dissociating B_{3}(N_{2})_{3}^{+} with infrared light and observing the decay of the corresponding mass-to-charge signal via mass spectrometry allowed an effective infrared spectrum of B_{3}(N_{2})_{3}^{+} to be recorded. This vibrational photodissociation spectrum contained only a single detectable vibration with a redshift of 98 cm^{−1} relative to gaseous N_{2}, suggesting a highly symmetric B_{3}(N_{2})_{3}^{+} adduct with slightly weakened N≡N bonding.

Negatively charged ions containing triboracyclopropenyl have proven amenable to study by photoelectron spectroscopy. By Koopman's theorem, neglecting the effects of strong electron correlation, the kinetic energies of electrons detached by X-rays can be mapped onto binding energies of individual orbitals and reveal the molecular electronic structure. Splitting of the resulting spectral peaks from "vibrational progression" (according to the Franck-Condon principle) indicates how ionization at different energies changes specific vibrational frequencies of the molecule, and such effects on bonding are interpreted in terms of changes to the electron configuration. In B_{3}^{−}, an unusually high-intensity and high energy band corresponding to a multielectron or "shake-up" transition (coupled electron detachment and electronic excitation) was observed, suggesting the strong electron correlation present in the triboracyclopropenyl fragment. For IrB_{3}^{−}, vibrational progression from the stretching and breathing vibrations of IrB_{3} could be assigned in the overlaid spectra of both isomers present in the cluster beam. By comparison to computations, the minimum energy structure of IrB_{3} could then be formulated as a tetrahedron with an intact, aromatic B_{3}^{+} moiety.

== Reactivity ==
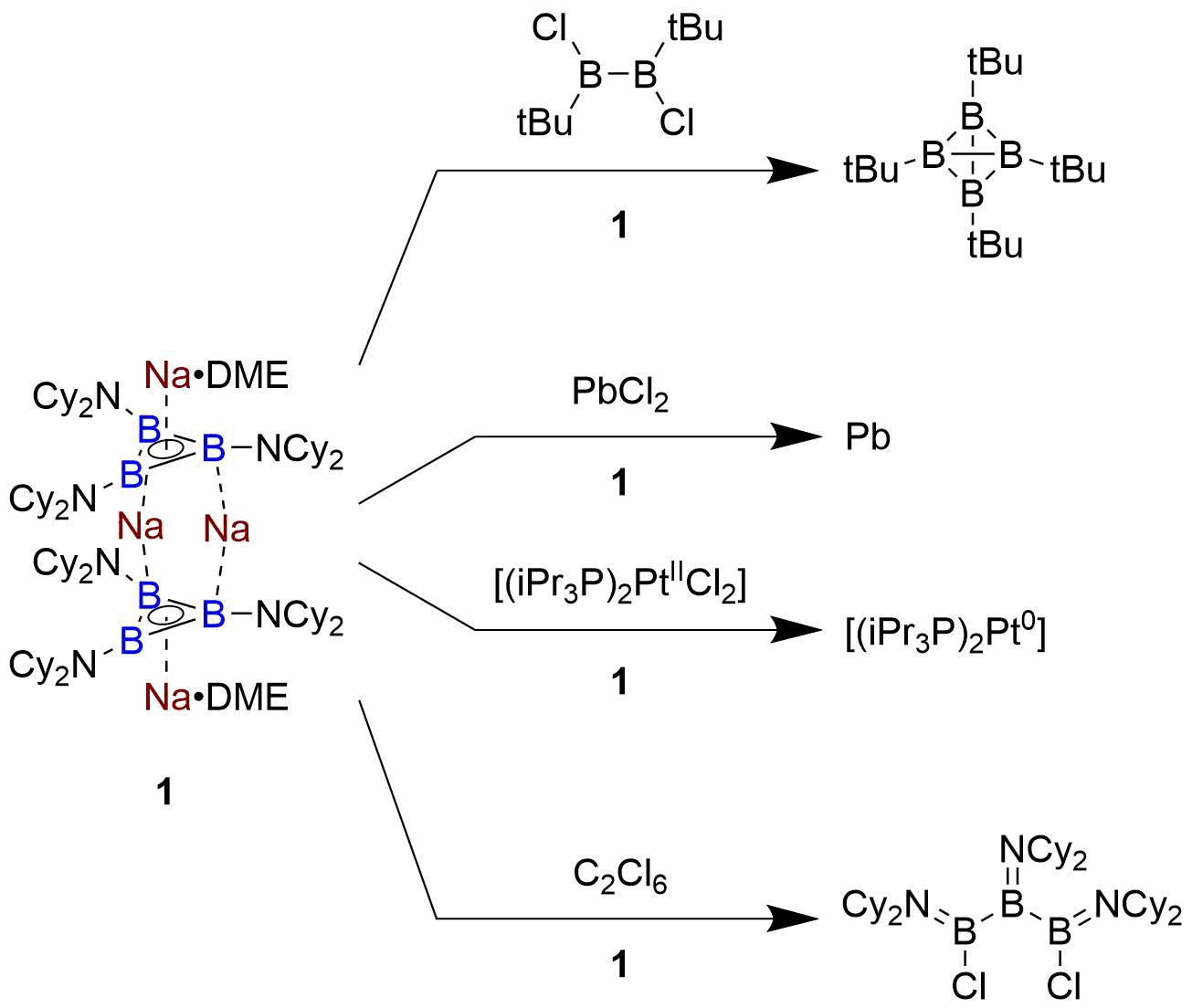
Na_{4}[B_{3}(NCy_{2})_{3}]_{2} • 2 DME acts as a strong reductant on a variety of substances.

The reactivity of triboracyclopropenyl-containing compounds is relatively under-explored, as only one example has been prepared in the solution phase. The compound reported by Braunschweig, Na_{4}[B_{3}(NCy_{2})_{3}]_{2} • 2 DME, is an extremely potent reductant with an oxidation potential of -2.42 V vs. the ferrocene/ferrocenium couple. As a result, it is capable of reducing chloroboranes to afford tetrahedral B clusters, along with reducing PbCl_{2} directly to metallic Pb. In addition, it will undergo a ring-opening reaction at the B_{3} moiety by abstracting chlorine atoms from hexachloroethane. This level of reducing power is roughly comparable to an alkali metal, and has not been previously observed for any molecule based on an organic framework.

Although most examples of transition metal-doped trinuclear boron clusters do not contain an aromatic triboracyclopropenyl fragment, the reactivity of such species with small molecules is likely to attract increasing scientific interest. It has been demonstrated under the conditions of mass spectrometry that VB_{3}^{+} dehydrogenates methane to afford the products VB_{3}CH_{2}^{+} and H_{2}. A minor side reaction that produces VH^{+} and eliminates B_{3}CH_{3} is also operative.

== See also ==
- Organoboron chemistry
- Cyclopropenium ion
