= Bicycloaromaticity =

Concept in chemistry

Bicycloaromaticity in chemistry is an extension of the concept of homoaromaticity with two aromatic ring currents situated in a non-planar molecule and sharing the same electrons. The concept originates with Melvin Goldstein who first reported about it in 1967. It is of some importance in academic research. Using MO theory the bicyclo[3.2.2]nonatrienyl cation was predicted to be destabilised and the corresponding anion predicted to be stabilised by bicycloaromaticity.

Bicycloaromaticity has been studied by others in relation to the bicyclo[3.2.2]nonatrienyl cation and in relation to specific carbanions. In 2017 experimental evidence was reported for bicycloaromaticity (dual aromaticity) to exist in a bicyclic porphyrinoid. This system has been described as aromatic with two ring systems of 26 (n=6) and 34 (n=8) electrons. By oxidation, another system was described as a triplet-state biradical, again considered aromatic by application of Baird's rule.
