= Cyclododecahexaene =

- Tri-trans isomer of cyclododecahexaene

Names
- Preferred IUPAC name (1Z,3E,5Z,7E,9Z,11E)-Cyclododeca-1,3,5,7,9,11-hexaene
- Other names [12]annulene

Identifiers
CAS Number	3227-77-8
3D model (JSmol)	Interactive image; EZEZEZEZ: Interactive image
ChemSpider	57559573; EZEZEZEZ: 10381705
PubChem CID	53438306
- InChI: InChI=1S/C12H12/c1-2-4-6-8-10-12-11-9-7-5-3-1/h1-12H Key: KWULAWFQRPFWEH-UHFFFAOYSA-N; EZEZEZEZ: InChI=1S/C12H12/c1-2-4-6-8-10-12-11-9-7-5-3-1/h1-12H/b2-1-,3-1-,4-2+,5-3+,6-4+,7-5+,8-6-,9-7-,10-8-,11-9-,12-10+,12-11+ Key: KWULAWFQRPFWEH-FWEBNODZSA-N
- SMILES: C1=CC=CC=CC=CC=CC=C1; EZEZEZEZ: C\1=C/C=C\C=C\C=C/C=C\C=C1

Properties
Chemical formula	C_{12}H_{12}
Molar mass	156.228 g·mol^{−1}
- Except where otherwise noted, data are given for materials in their standard state (at 25 °C [77 °F], 100 kPa). Infobox references

Cyclododecahexaene or [12]annulene (C_{12}H_{12}) is a member of the series of annulenes with some interest in organic chemistry with regard to the study of aromaticity. Cyclododecahexaene is non-aromatic due to the lack of planarity of the structure. On the other hand the dianion with 14 electrons is a aromatic by Hückel's rules and more stable.

According to in silico experiments the tri-trans isomer is expected to be the most stable, followed by the 1,7-ditrans and the all cis-isomers (+1 kcal/mol) and by the 1,5-ditrans isomer (+5 kcal/mol).

The first [12]annulene with sym-tri-trans configuration was synthesized in 1970 from a tricyclic precursor by photolysis at low temperatures. On heating the compound rearranges to a bicyclic [6.4.0] isomer. Reducing the compound at low temperatures allowed analysis of the dianion by proton NMR with the inner protons resonating at −4.5 ppm relative to TMS, evidence of an aromatic diamagnetic ring current.

[12]annulene synthesis

In one study the 1,7-ditrans isomer is generated at low temperatures in THF by dehydrohalogenation of a hexabromocyclododecane with potassium tert-butoxide. Reduction of this compound at low temperature with caesium metal leads first to the radical anion and then to the dianion. The chemical shift for the internal protons in this compound is with +0.2 ppm much more modest than in the tri-trans isomer.

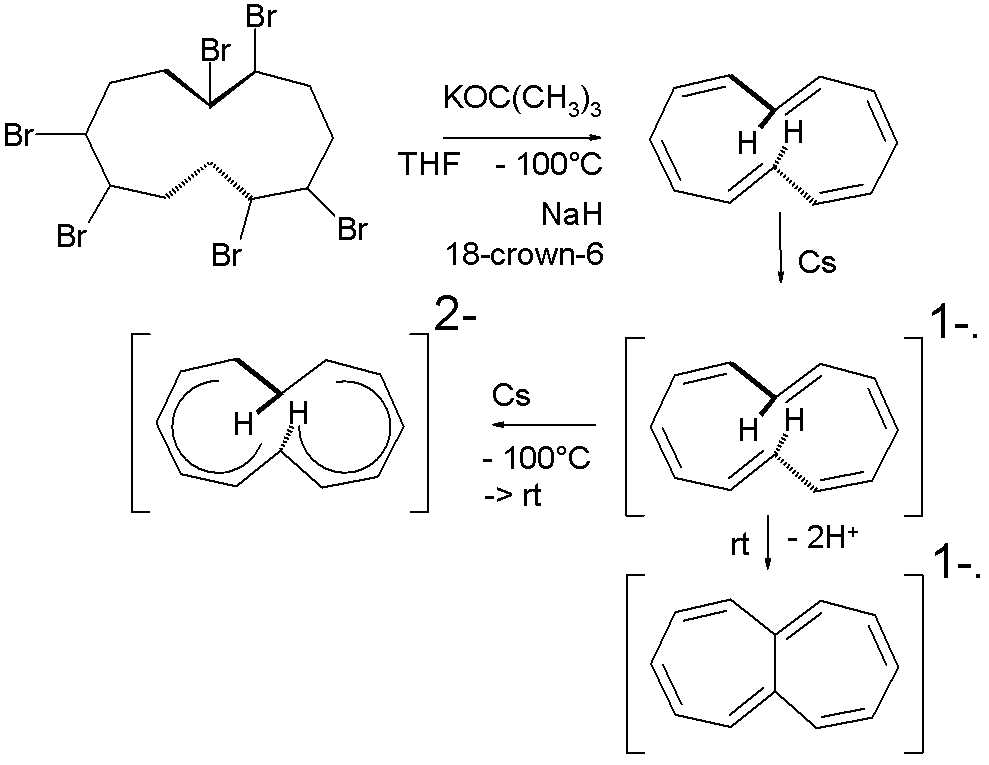
[12]annulene synthesis

Heating the radical ion solution to room temperature leads to loss of one equivalent of hydrogen and formation of the heptalene radical anion.
