= Baird's rule =

Rule in organic chemistry

In organic chemistry, Baird's rule estimates whether the lowest triplet state of planar, cyclic structures will have aromatic properties or not. The quantum mechanical basis for its formulation was first worked out by physical chemist N. Colin Baird at the University of Western Ontario in 1972.

The lowest triplet state of an annulene is, according to Baird's rule, aromatic when it has 4n π-electrons and antiaromatic when the π-electron count is 4n + 2, where n is any positive integer. This trend is opposite to that predicted by Hückel's rule for the ground state, which is usually the lowest singlet state (S_{0}). Baird's rule has thus become known as the photochemical analogue of Hückel's rule.

Through various theoretical investigations, this rule has also been found to extend to the lowest lying singlet excited state (S_{1}) of small annulenes.

== See also ==
- Möbius–Hückel concept
- Möbius aromaticity
