= Hückel's rule =

Method of determining aromaticity in organic molecules

Benzene, the most widely recognized aromatic compound with six delocalized π-electrons (4n + 2, for n = 1).

In organic chemistry, Hückel's rule predicts that a planar ring molecule will have aromatic properties if it has (4n + 2) π-electrons, where n is a non-negative integer. The quantum mechanical basis for its formulation was first worked out by physical chemist Erich Hückel in 1931. The succinct expression as the 4n + 2 rule has been attributed to W. v. E. Doering (1951), although several authors were using this form at around the same time.

In agreement with the Möbius–Hückel concept, a cyclic ring molecule follows Hückel's rule when the number of its π-electrons equals 4n + 2, although clearcut examples are really only established for values of n = 0 up to about n = 6. Hückel's rule was originally based on calculations using the Hückel method, although it can also be justified by considering a particle in a ring system, by the LCAO method and by the Pariser–Parr–Pople method.

Aromatic compounds are more stable than theoretically predicted using hydrogenation data of simple alkenes; the additional stability is due to the delocalized cloud of electrons, called resonance energy. Criteria for simple aromatics are:

1. the molecule must have 4n + 2 (a so-called "Hückel number") π electrons (2, 6, 10, ...) in a conjugated system of p orbitals (usually on sp^{2}-hybridized atoms, but sometimes sp-hybridized);
2. the molecule must be (close to) planar (p orbitals must be roughly parallel and able to interact, implicit in the requirement for conjugation);
3. the molecule must be cyclic (as opposed to linear);
4. the molecule must have a continuous ring of p atomic orbitals (there cannot be any sp^{3} atoms in the ring, nor do exocyclic p orbitals count).

== Monocyclic hydrocarbons ==
The rule can be used to understand the stability of completely conjugated monocyclic hydrocarbons (known as annulenes) as well as their cations and anions. The best-known example is benzene (C_{6}H_{6}) with a conjugated system of six π electrons, which equals 4n + 2 for n = 1. The molecule undergoes substitution reactions which preserve the six π electron system rather than addition reactions which would destroy it. The stability of this π electron system is referred to as aromaticity. Still, in most cases, catalysts are necessary for substitution reactions to occur.

The cyclopentadienyl anion (C_{5}H^{–}_{5}) with six π electrons is planar and readily generated from the unusually acidic cyclopentadiene (pK_{a} 16), while the corresponding cation with four π electrons is destabilized, being harder to generate than a typical acyclic pentadienyl cations and is thought to be antiaromatic. Similarly, the tropylium cation (C_{7}H^{+}_{7}), also with six π electrons, is so stable compared to a typical carbocation that its salts can be crystallized from ethanol. On the other hand, in contrast to cyclopentadiene, cycloheptatriene is not particularly acidic (pK_{a} 37) and the anion is considered nonaromatic. The cyclopropenyl cation (C_{3}H^{+}_{3}) and the triboracyclopropenyl dianion (B_{3}H^{2–}_{3}) are considered examples of a two π electron system, which are stabilized relative to the open system, despite the angle strain imposed by the 60° bond angles.

Planar ring molecules with 4n π electrons do not obey Hückel's rule, and theory predicts that they are less stable and have triplet ground states with two unpaired electrons. In practice, such molecules distort from planar regular polygons. Cyclobutadiene (C_{4}H_{4}) with four π electrons is stable only at temperatures below 35 K and is rectangular rather than square. Cyclooctatetraene (C_{8}H_{8}) with eight π electrons has a nonplanar "tub" structure. However, the dianion C_{8}H^{2–}_{8} (cyclooctatetraenide anion), with ten π electrons obeys the 4n + 2 rule for n = 2 and is planar, while the 1,4-dimethyl derivative of the dication, with six π electrons, is also believed to be planar and aromatic. The Cyclononatetraenide anion (C_{9}H^{–}_{9}) is the largest all-cis monocyclic annulene/annulenyl system that is planar and aromatic. These bond angles (140°) differ significantly from the ideal angles of 120°. Larger rings possess trans bonds to avoid the increased angle strain. However, 10 to 14-membered systems all experience considerable transannular strain. Thus, these systems are either nonaromatic or experience modest aromaticity. This changes when we get to [18]annulene, with (4×4) + 2 = 18 π electrons, which is large enough to accommodate six interior hydrogen atoms in a planar configuration (3 cis double bonds and 6 trans double bonds). Thermodynamic stabilization, NMR chemical shifts, and nearly equal bond lengths all point to considerable aromaticity for [18]annulene.

The (4n+2) rule is a consequence of the degeneracy of the π orbitals in cyclic conjugated hydrocarbon molecules. As predicted by Hückel molecular orbital theory, the lowest π orbital in such molecules is non-degenerate and the higher orbitals form degenerate pairs. Benzene's lowest π orbital is non-degenerate and can hold 2 electrons, and its next 2 π orbitals form a degenerate pair which can hold 4 electrons. Its 6 π electrons therefore form a stable closed shell in a regular hexagonal molecule.

However for cyclobutadiene or cyclooctatriene with regular geometries, the highest molecular orbital pair is occupied by only 2 π electrons forming a less stable open shell. The molecules therefore stabilize by geometrical distortions which separate the degenerate orbital energies so that the last two electrons occupy the same orbital, but the molecule as a whole is less stable in the presence of such a distortion.

== Heteroatoms ==
Hückel's rule can also be applied to molecules containing other atoms such as nitrogen or oxygen. For example, pyridine (C_{5}H_{5}N) has a ring structure similar to benzene, except that one -CH- group is replaced by a nitrogen atom with no hydrogen. There are still six π electrons and the pyridine molecule is also aromatic and known for its stability.

== Polycyclic hydrocarbons ==
Hückel's rule is not valid for many compounds containing more than one ring. For example, pyrene and trans-bicalicene contain 16 conjugated electrons (8 bonds), and coronene contains 24 conjugated electrons (12 bonds). Both of these polycyclic molecules are aromatic, even though they fail the 4n + 2 rule. Indeed, Hückel's rule can only be theoretically justified for monocyclic systems.

== Three-dimensional rule ==
In 2000, Andreas Hirsch and coworkers in Erlangen, Germany, formulated a rule to determine when a spherical compound will be aromatic. They found that closed-shell compounds were aromatic when they had 2(n + 1)^{2} π-electrons, for instance the buckminsterfullerene species C_{60}^{10+}.

In 2011, Jordi Poater and Miquel Solà expanded the rule to open-shell spherical compounds, finding they were aromatic when they had 2n^{2} + 2n + 1 π-electrons, with spin S = (n + 1/2) - corresponding to a half-filled last occupied energy level with the same spin. For instance C_{60}^{1–} is also observed to be aromatic with a spin of 11/2.

== See also ==
- Baird's rule (for triplet states)
