= Delocalized electron =

Electrons that are not associated with a single atom or covalent bond

Benzene, with the delocalization of the electrons indicated by the circle

In chemistry, delocalized electrons are electrons in a molecule, ion or solid metal that are not associated with a single atom or a covalent bond.

The term delocalization is general and can have slightly different meanings in different fields:

- In organic chemistry, it refers to resonance in conjugated systems and aromatic compounds.
- In solid-state physics, it refers to free electrons that facilitate electrical conduction.
- In quantum chemistry, it refers to molecular orbital electrons that have extended over several adjacent atoms.

== Resonance ==
In the simple aromatic ring of benzene, the delocalization of six π electrons over the C_{6} ring is often graphically indicated by a circle. The fact that the six C—C bonds are equidistant is one indication that the electrons are delocalized; if the structure were to have isolated double bonds alternating with discrete single bonds, the bond would likewise have alternating longer and shorter lengths. In valence bond theory, delocalization in benzene is represented by resonance structures.

== Electrical conduction ==
Delocalized electrons also exist in the structure of solid metals. Metallic structure consists of aligned positive ions (cations) in a "sea" of delocalized electrons. This means that the electrons are free to move throughout the structure, and gives rise to properties such as conductivity.

In diamond all four outer electrons of each carbon atom are 'localized' between the atoms in covalent bonding. The movement of electrons is restricted and diamond does not conduct an electric current. In graphite, each carbon atom uses only 3 of its 4 outer energy level electrons in covalently bonding to three other carbon atoms in a plane. Each carbon atom contributes one electron to a delocalized system of electrons that is also a part of the chemical bonding. The delocalized electrons are free to move throughout the plane. For this reason, graphite conducts electricity along the planes of carbon atoms, but does not conduct in a direction at right angles to the plane.

== Molecular orbitals ==
Standard ab initio quantum chemistry methods lead to delocalized orbitals that, in general, extend over an entire molecule and have the symmetry of the molecule. Localized orbitals may then be found as linear combinations of the delocalized orbitals, given by an appropriate unitary transformation.

In the methane molecule, ab initio calculations show bonding character in four molecular orbitals, sharing the electrons uniformly among all five atoms. There are two orbital levels, a bonding molecular orbital formed from the 2s orbital on carbon and triply degenerate bonding molecular orbitals from each of the 2p orbitals on carbon. The localized sp^{3} orbitals corresponding to each individual bond in valence bond theory can be obtained from a linear combination of the four molecular orbitals.

== See also ==
- Aromatic ring current
- Electride
- Solvated electron
