= Möbius–Hückel concept =

Method of predicting if a chemical reaction can occur

In chemistry, the Möbius–Hückel treatment is a methodology used to predict whether a reaction is allowed or forbidden. It is often used along with the Woodward–Hoffmann approach. The description in this article uses the plus and minus sign notation for parity as shorthand while proceeding around a cycle of orbitals in a molecule or system, while the Woodward–Hoffmann methodology uses a large number of rules with the same consequences.

== Introduction ==
One year following the Woodward–Hoffmann and Longuet-Higgins–Abrahmson publications, it was noted by Zimmerman that both transition states and stable molecules sometimes involved a Möbius array of basis orbitals. The Möbius–Hückel treatment provides an alternative to the Woodward–Hoffmann one. In contrast to the Woodward–Hoffmann approach the Möbius–Hückel treatment is not dependent on symmetry and only requires counting the number of plus-sign ↔ minus-sign inversions in proceeding around the cyclic array of orbitals. Where one has zero or an even number of sign inversions there is a Hückel array. Where an odd-number of sign inversions is found a Möbius array is determined to be present. Thus the approach goes beyond the geometric consideration of Edgar Heilbronner. In any case, symmetry may be present or may not.

Edgar Heilbronner had described twisted annulenes which had Möbius topology, but in including the twist of these systems, he concluded that Möbius systems could never be lower in energy than the Hückel counterparts. In contrast, the Möbius–Hückel concept considers systems with an equal twist for Hückel and Möbius systems.

== The theory and concept ==
For Möbius systems there is an odd number of plus–minus sign inversions in the basis set in proceeding around the cycle. A circle mnemonic was advanced which provides the MO energies of the system; this was the counterpart of the Frost–Musulin mnemonic for ordinary Hückel systems. It was concluded that 4n electrons is the preferred number for Möbius moieties in contrast to the common 4n + 2 electrons for Hückel systems.

=== The Möbius–Hückel circle mnemonic ===
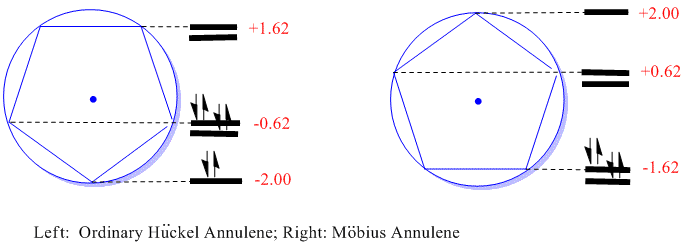
Figure 1. The Möbius–Hückel Circle Mnemonic applied to the example of cyclopentadienyl

To determine the energy levels, the polygon corresponding to the cyclic annulene is desired is inscribed in the circle of radius 2β and centered at α (the energy of an isolated p orbital). The y-coordinate of the vertices of the polygon are the simple Hückel theory orbital energies. For systems with Hückel topology, the vertex is positioned at the circle bottom as suggested by Frost; for systems with Möbius topology, a polygon side is positioned at the circle bottom. In other words, for an N carbon system, the Möbius Frost circle is rotated by π/N radians compared to the Hückel system. It is seen that with one MO at the bottom and then groups of degenerate pairs, the Hückel systems will accommodate 4n + 2 electrons, following the ordinary Hückel rule. However, in contrast, the Möbius Systems have degenerate pairs of molecular orbitals starting at the circle bottom and thus will accommodate 4n electrons. For cyclic annulenes one then predicts which species will be favored. The method applies equally to cyclic reaction intermediates and transition states for pericyclic processes.

== Application to molecules and pericyclic reactions ==
Thus it was noted that along the reaction coordinate of pericyclic processes one could have either a Möbius or a Hückel array of basis orbitals. With 4n or 4n + 2 electrons, one is then led to a prediction of allowedness or forbiddenness. Additionally, the M–H mnemonics give the MOs at part reaction. At each degeneracy there is a crossing of MOs. Thus one can determine if the highest occupied MO becomes antibonding with a forbidden reaction resulting. Finally, the M–H parity of sign inversions was utilized in the 1970 W–H treatment of allowedness and forbiddenness. The parity of sign inversions between bonds and atoms was used in place of the M–H use of atoms; the two approaches are equivalent.

== Simple tabular correlation of allowedness and forbiddenness of Möbius versus Hückel and 4n + 2 versus 4n electrons ==
Figure 2. Prediction of allowed versus forbidden electron counts
	Hückel	Möbius
4n+2 e^{–}	Allowed aromatic	Forbidden anti-aromatic
4n e^{–}	Forbidden anti-aromatic	Allowed aromatic

The table in Figure 2 summarizes the Möbius–Hückel concept. The columns specify whether one has a Möbius or a Hückel structure and the rows specify whether 4n + 2 electrons or 4n electrons are present. Depending on which is present, a Möbius or a Hückel system, one selects the first or the second column. Then depending on the number of electrons present, 4n + 2 or 4n, one selects the first or the second row.

== The generalized Möbius–Hückel orbital arrays ==
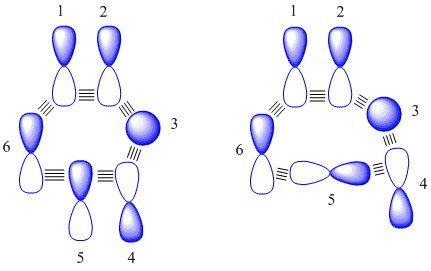
Figure 3. Möbius (left) and Hückel (right) orbital arrays.

The two orbital arrays in Figure 3 are just examples and do not correspond to real systems. In inspecting the Möbius one on the left, plus–minus overlaps are seen between orbital pairs 2-3, 3-4, 4-5, 5-6, and 6-1, corresponding to an odd number (5), as required by a Möbius system. Inspection of the Hückel one on the right, plus–minus overlaps are seen between orbital pairs 2-3, 3-4, 4-5, and 6-1, corresponding to an even number (4), as required by a Hückel system.

The plus–minus orientation of each orbital is arbitrary since these are just basis set orbitals and do not correspond to any molecular orbital. If any orbital were to change signs, two plus–minus overlaps are either removed or added and the parity (evenness or oddness) is not changed. One choice of signs leads to zero plus–minus overlaps for the Hückel array on the right.

== The butadiene to cyclobutene example ==
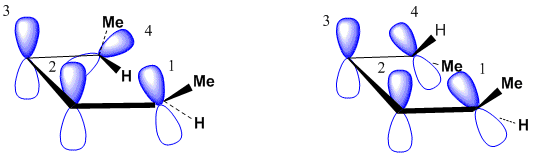
Figure 4. Butadiene–cyclobutene interconversion; disrotation per Hückel (left), conrotation per Möbius (right).

Figure 4 shows the orbital array involved in the butadiene to cyclobutene interconversion. It is seen that there are four orbitals in this cyclic array. Thus in the interconversion reactions orbitals 1 and 4 overlap either in a conrotatory or a disrotatory fashion. Also, it is seen that the conrotation involves one plus–minus overlap as drawn while the disrotation involves zero plus–minus overlaps as drawn. Thus the conrotation uses a Möbius array while the disrotation uses a Hückel array.

But as described for the generalized orbital array in Figure 3, that the assignment of the basis-set p-orbitals is arbitrary. Were one p-orbital in either reaction mode to be written upside-down, this would change the number of sign inversions by two and not change the evenness or oddness of the orbital array.

With a conrotation giving a Möbius system, with butadiene's four electrons, we find an "allowed" reaction model. With disrotation giving a Hückel system, with the four electrons, we find a "forbidden" reaction model.

Although in these two examples symmetry is present, symmetry is not required or involved in determination of reaction allowedness versus forbiddenness. Hence a very large number of organic reactions can be understood. Even where symmetry is present, the Möbius–Hückel analysis proves simple to employ.

== MO degeneracies leading to correlation diagrams ==
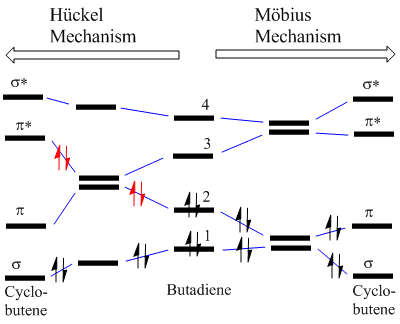
Figure 5. Möbius–Hückel correlation diagram; two modes of butadiene to cyclobutene conversion.

It has been noted that for every degeneracy along a reaction coordinate there is a molecular orbital crossing. Thus for the butadiene to cyclobutene conversion, the two Möbius (here conrotatory) and Hückel (here disrotatory) modes are shown in Figure 5. The starting MOs are depicted in the center of the correlation diagram with blue correlation lines connecting MOs. It is seen that for the Möbius mode the four electrons in MOs 1 and 2 end in the bonding MOs (i.e. σ and π) of cyclobutene. In contrast, for the Hückel mode, there is a degeneracy and thus an MO crossing leading to two electrons (drawn in red) are headed for an antibonding MO. Thus the Hückel mode is forbidden while the Möbius mode is allowed.

One further relevant point is that the first organic correlation diagrams were in a 1961 publication on carbanion rearrangements. It had been noted that when an occupied molecular orbital becomes antibonding the reaction is inhibited and this phenomenon was correlated with a series of rearrangements.

== Relation of the Möbius–Hückel concept to the Woodward–Hoffmann methods ==
Until 1969 there was no obvious relationship except that the two methods lead to the same predictions. As noted earlier, the Woodward–Hoffmann method requires symmetry. But in 1969 and 1970 a general formulation was published, namely, A ground-state pericyclic change is symmetry-allowed when the total number of (4q + 2)_{s} and (4r)_{a} components is odd. The 1969–1970 Woodward–Hoffmann general formulation is seen to be equivalent to the Zimmerman Möbius–Hückel concept. Thus each (4r)_{a} component provides one plus–minus overlap in the cyclic array (i.e. an odd number) for 4n electrons. The (4q + 2)_{s} component just makes certain that the number of electrons in symmetric bonds is 4n + 2.

The equivalency of the more recent formulation of the Woodward–Hoffmann rules has been discussed.
