= Aromatic ring current =

Electric current observed in aromatic compounds

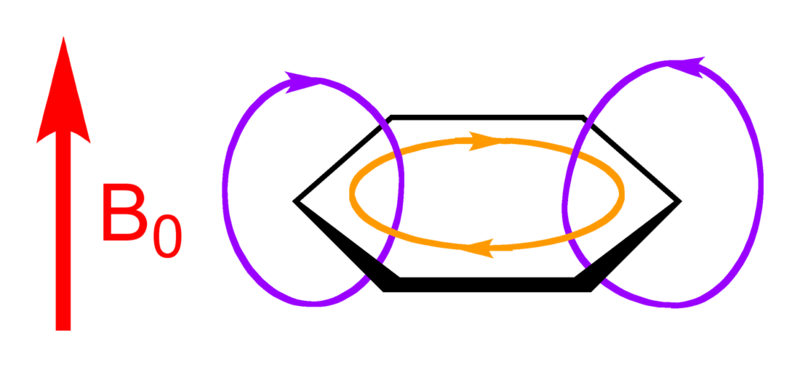
A diagram of an aromatic ring current. B_{0} is the applied magnetic field, the red arrow indicating its direction. The orange ring shows the direction of the ring current, and the purple rings show the direction of the induced magnetic field.

An aromatic ring current is an effect observed in aromatic molecules such as benzene and naphthalene. If a magnetic field is directed perpendicular to the plane of the aromatic system, a ring current is induced in the delocalized π electrons of the aromatic ring. This is a direct consequence of Ampère's law; since the electrons involved are free to circulate, rather than being localized in bonds as they would be in most non-aromatic molecules, they respond much more strongly to the magnetic field.

The ring current creates its own magnetic field. Outside the ring, this field is in the same direction as the externally applied magnetic field; inside the ring, the field counteracts the externally applied field. As a result, the net magnetic field outside the ring is greater than the externally applied field alone, and is less inside the ring.

== Relevance to NMR spectroscopy ==
Aromatic ring currents are relevant to NMR spectroscopy, as they dramatically influence the chemical shifts of ^{1}H nuclei ("protons") in aromatic molecules. The effect helps distinguish these nuclear environments and is therefore of great use in molecular structure determination. In benzene, the ring protons experience deshielding because the induced magnetic field has the same direction outside the ring as the external field and their chemical shift is 7.3 parts per million (ppm) compared to 5.6 for the vinylic proton in cyclohexene. In contrast any proton inside the aromatic ring experiences shielding because both fields are in opposite direction. This effect can be observed in cyclooctadecanonaene ([18]annulene) with 6 inner protons at −3 ppm.

The situation is reversed in antiaromatic compounds. In the dianion of [18]annulene the inner protons are strongly deshielded at 20.8 ppm and 29.5 ppm with the outer protons significantly shielded (with respect to the reference) at −1.1 ppm. Hence a diamagnetic ring current or diatropic ring current is associated with aromaticity whereas a paratropic ring current signals antiaromaticity.

A similar effect is observed in three-dimensional fullerenes; in this case it is called a sphere current.

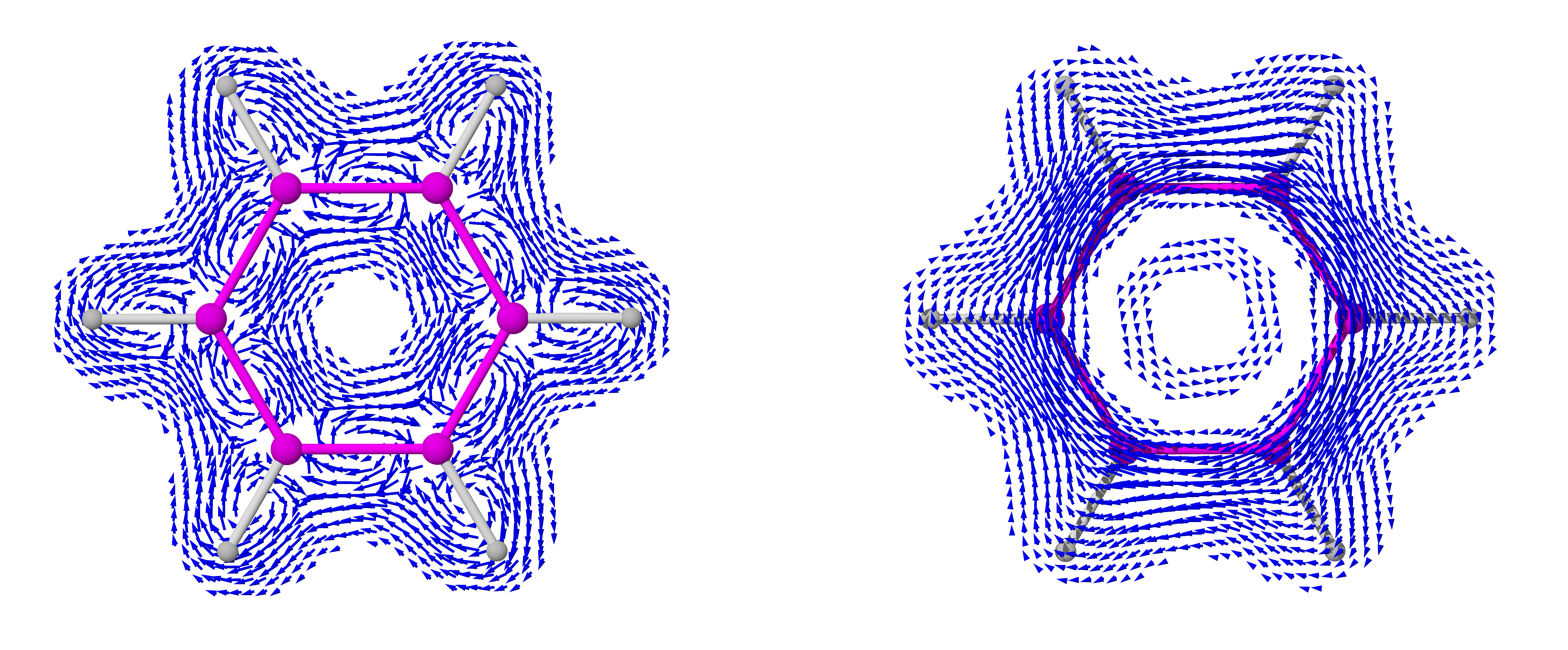
Magnetically induced probability current density vectors in benzene (C_{6}H_{6}) calculated explicitly using quantum chemical methods. B_{0} is set perpendicular to the molecular plane, in the left subfigure only vectors in the molecular plane are shown, in the right subfigure only vectors 1 a.u. (~52 pm) above the molecular plane are shown. Only vectors with a modulus between 0.01 and 0.1 nA/T are displayed. Contrasting the schematic picture, which gives in analogy to the laws of classical electrodynamics only diatropic contributions, the full quantum mechanical picture also yield paratropic contributions, as counter-clockwise vortices in this diagram. These are located in benzene mainly in the molecular plane, inside the C_{6} ring.

== Relative aromaticity ==
Numerous attempts have been made to quantify aromaticity with respect to the observed ring current. One method is called diamagnetic susceptibility exaltation Λ defined as the difference between the measured magnetic susceptibility of a compound and a calculated value based on group additivity tables. Large negative values are aromatic, for example, benzene (Λ = −13.4). Values close to zero are non-aromatic, for example, borazine (Λ = −1.7) and cyclohexane (Λ = 1.1). Large positive values are antiaromatic, for example, cyclobutadiene (Λ = +18).

Another measurable quantity is the chemical shift of lithium ions Li^{+} in complexes of lithium with aromatic structures because lithium tends to bond as a π-coordination complex to the face of the aromatic rings. Thus the lithium atom in cyclopentadienyl lithium (CpLi) has a chemical shift of −8.6 ppm (aromatic) and its Cp_{2}Li^{−} complex a shift of −13.1.

Both methods suffer from the disadvantage that values depend on ring size.

Selected NICS values
Chemical	ppm
Pyrrole	−15.1
Thiophene	−13.6
Furan	−12.3
Naphthalene	−9.9
Benzene	−9.7
Tropylium	−7.6
Cyclopentadiene	−3.2
Cyclohexane	−2.2
Pentalene	18.1
Heptalene	22.7
Cyclobutadiene	27.6

=== Nucleus-independent chemical shift ===
The nucleus-independent chemical shift (NICS) is a computational method that calculates the absolute magnetic shielding at the center of a ring. The values are reported with a reversed sign to make them compatible with the chemical shift conventions of NMR spectroscopy. In this method, negative NICS values indicate aromaticity, and positive values indicate antiaromaticity. There are a variety of methods to calculate NICS values, however, the most robust method for calculating NICS values involves scanning the molecule in a NICSzz scan. In this process, the NICS value is calculated above the rings, and this allows for evaluating the aromatics of each ring, which is especially useful for polycyclic compounds.

=== Harmonic oscillator model of aromaticity ===
Yet another method called the harmonic oscillator model of aromaticity (HOMA) is defined as a normalized sum of squared deviations of bond lengths from the optimal value, which is assumed to be realized for a fully aromatic system. An aromatic compound has HOMA value 1, whereas a non-aromatic compound has value 0. For all-carbon systems, the HOMA value is defined as

$$\mathrm{A} = 1 - \frac{V}{n} \sum^n_i(d_\text{opt} - d_i)^2,$$

where V = 257.7 Å^{−2} is the normalization value, n is the number of carbon–carbon bonds, and d are bond lengths (d_{opt} = 1.388 Å is the optimal value, and d_{i} are the observed or computed values).
