= C12H10 =

The molecular formula C_{12}H_{10} may refer to:

- Acenaphthene
- Benzocyclooctatetraene
- Biphenyl
- 1,3,5,7,9-Cyclododecapentaen-11-yne
- Dodecatetrayne
- Elassovalene
- Ethenylnaphthalene
  - 1-Ethenylnaphthalene
  - 2-Ethenylnaphthalene
- Heptalene
- Sesquifulvalene
