= C8H6 =

The molecular formula C_{8}H_{6} (molar mass: 102.13 g/mol, exact mass: 102.0470 u) may refer to:

- Benzocyclobutadiene
- Pentalene
- Phenylacetylene
- Calicene, or triapentafulvalene
- Cubene
