= C6H4 =

The molecular formula C_{6}H_{4} (molar mass: 76.10 g/mol, exact mass: 76.0313 u) may refer to:

- Benzyne
- Phenylene
- Triafulvalene, or cyclopropenylidenecyclopropene
- Butalene
