= Polyferrocenes =

Structure of a poly(1,1′-ferrocene-silane).

Polyferrocenes are polymers containing ferrocene units. Ferrocene-derived polymers have been studied for their optical and electrical properties. Despite nearly a half-century of research, polyferrocenes still have no commercial applications.

== Construction ==
Biferrocene is the smallest unit of polyferrocene.

The simplest notional polyferrocene is poly(1,1′‑ferrocenylene), corresponding to a series of bis(fulvalene)diiron molecules, but with the fulvalene moieties offset to link the molecules. It is extraordinarily difficult to manufacture pure, as even small oligomers rapidly precipitate from solution into an inhomogenous mass. Nevertheless, yields of up to ~80% are possible, and the product is a p-type semiconductor.

Many spacer-substituted polyferrocenes are accessed relatively easily. Ring-opening polymerization usually leads to polymers containing ferrocene in the backbone: for example, poly(1,1'-ferrocene-silane). Oxidizing the resulting polymers can convert up to half the sandwiches to ferrocinium ions, as electrostatic repulsion prevents the oxidation of adjacent metallocenes.

Ferrocene can also be attached as pendant unit (ferrocenylated polymers, as it were).

== Potential applications ==
=== Conductive materials ===
Polyvinylferrocene gives electroactive films that have been investigated as glucose sensors, and spacecraft anti-charging coatings.

=== High refractive index ===
Polyferroccenes have attracted interest as high-refractive-index polymers, for anti-reflective coatings or light-emitting diodes. Poly(1,1'-ferrocene-silane)e, poly(1,1'-ferrocene-phosphane) and polyferrocenes with phenyl side chains are polymers with unusually high refractive index, with values in the refractive index of up to 1.74. These polyferrocenes show good film-forming ability.

=== Plasma resistance ===
Poly(ferrocene-dimethylsilane)s (PFS) are promising as barrier materials in plasma-assisted reactive ion etching. Due to the presence of iron and silicon in the main chain, the polymer proved to be relatively stable compared to purely organic polymers. During the etching, a thin iron and silicon-containing oxide layer was formed on the surface of the poly(ferrocene-dimethylsilane).
