= Dioxin =

Dioxin may refer to a number of different substances. Most notably:

- 1,2-Dioxin or 1,4-dioxin, two unsaturated heterocyclic 6-membered rings in which two carbon atoms have been replaced by oxygen atoms, which gives the molecular formula C_{4}H_{4}O_{2}. 1,2-dioxin is an unstable organic peroxide.
- Dibenzo-1,4-dioxin, also known as dibenzodioxin or dibenzo-p-dioxin (molecular formula C_{12}H_{8}O_{2}), in which two benzene rings are connected through two oxygen atoms. That is the parent compound of the dioxins (see next in which the dioxins comprise a key part of the class).
- Dioxins and dioxin-like compounds, a diverse class of polychlorinated chemical compounds, including polychlorinated dibenzodioxins (PCDDs) and dibenzofurans (PCDFs), that are persistent organic pollutants and known to exhibit "dioxin-like" toxicity.
- 2,3,7,8-Tetrachlorodibenzodioxin (TCDD), the prototypical and most toxic example of the above class, often referred to simply as "dioxin".

== See also ==
- 1,4-Dioxane, the saturated analog of 1,4-dioxin
- Digoxin
- Dioxin affair, a 1999 crisis in Belgium
- Seveso disaster, a 1976 crisis in Italy
