= Hrip =

Hrip or HRIP may refer to:

- Hrip, a village in the commune Păulești, Satu Mare County, Romania.
- High-refractive-index polymer, often abbreviated to HRIP.
