= Mitsui Chemicals =

Japanese chemicals company

Mitsui Chemicals, Inc.

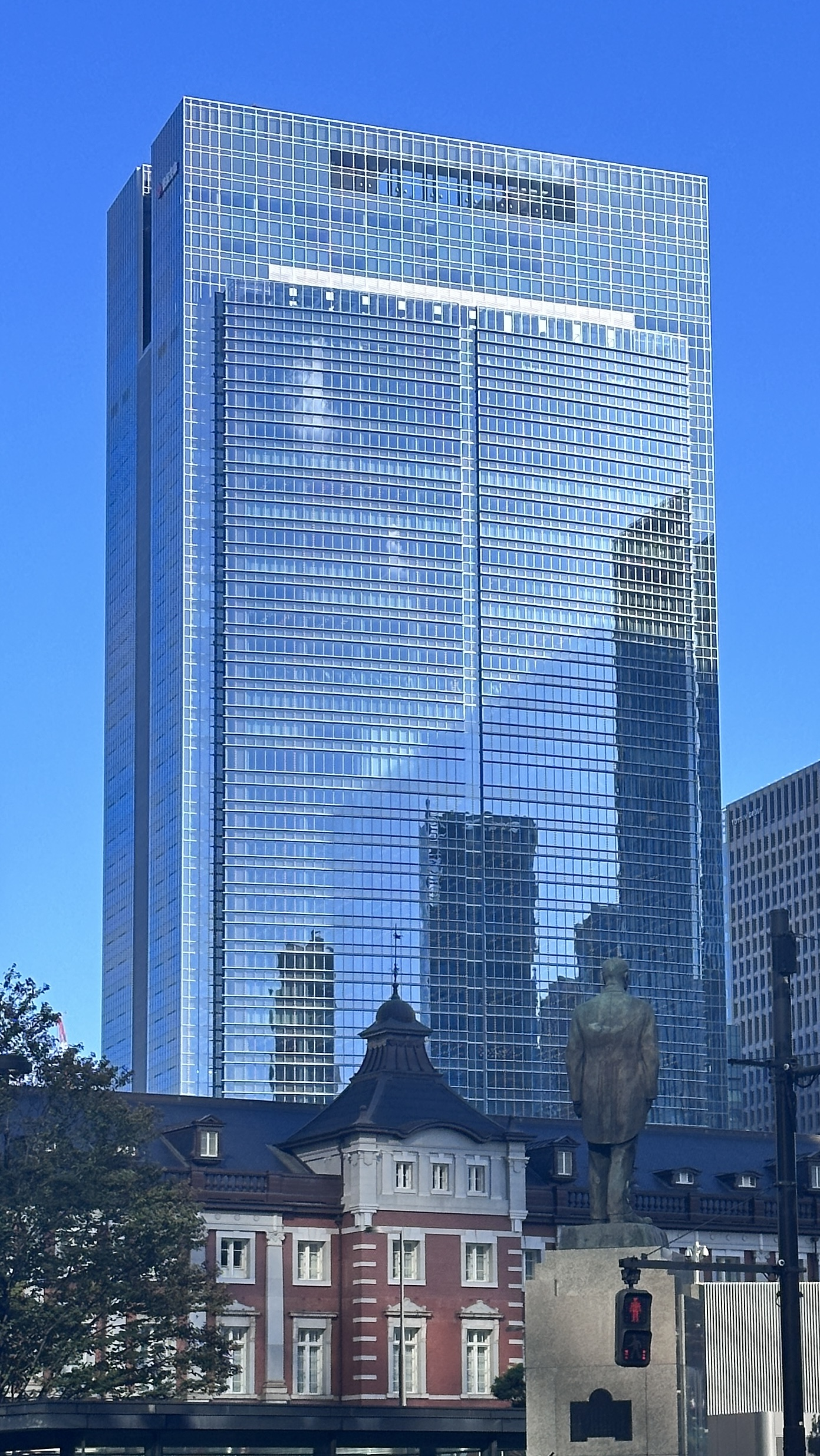
- Headquarters in Yaesu, Chuo, Tokyo
- Native name: 三井化学株式会社
- Type: Public (K.K)
- Traded as: TYO: 4183; Nikkei 225 Component
- ISIN: JP3888300005
- Industry: Chemicals
- Predecessor: Mitsui Petrochemicals Industries; Mitsui Toatsu Chemicals
- Founded: October 1, 1997; 29 years ago
- Headquarters: Shiodome City Center, Higashi-Shimbashi, Minato-ku, Tokyo 105-7122, Japan
- Area served: Worldwide
- Key people: Tsutomu Tannowa (President and CEO)
- Products: Functional chemicals; Polymeric materials; Basic chemicals; Petrochemicals; Films and sheets
- Revenue: JPY 1,343 billion (FY 2015) (US$ 11.9 billion) (FY 2015)
- Net income: JPY 22.9 billion (FY 2015) (US$ 203 million) (FY 2015)
- Number of employees: 13,447 (consolidated as of March 31, 2016)
- Website: Official website

Mitsui Chemicals (三井化学株式会社, Mitsui-Kagaku Kabushiki-gaisha) is a Japanese chemicals company listed on the Nikkei with business interests in Japan, Europe, China, Southeast Asia and the USA. It is one of the leading chemical companies in Japan and is part of the Mitsui conglomerate. The company mainly deals in performance materials, petrochemicals and basic chemicals and functional polymeric materials.

== History ==
Mitsui Chemicals of the Mitsui group emerged in 1968 with the merger of Toyo Koatsu and Mitsui Chemical Industry. The former was established in 1933 and was mainly engaged in the manufacture of fertilizers while the latter was founded in 1941 and produced dyes and organic intermediates. The new entity focused in the production of four product lines: fertilizers; basic products (methanol, formaldehyde, phenol, aniline, bisphenol A, TDI, MDI, and melamine); polymers; and, fine chemicals.

Due to the opportunities in India, Mitsui Chemicals has decided to establish its first polypropylene compounding plant in India at 'Japanese Investment park' Neemrana phase III. The unit being set up will be the manufacturing base of Mitsui Chemicals Group in India in which Mitsui Chemicals holds 80% equity and 20% equity is with another subsidiary, Prime Polymers Company of Japan.

In February 2021, the company stopped operations in their Ichihara petrochemical complex in east Japan's Chiba prefecture to carry out safety inspections after an earthquake hit northeast Japan's Fukushima prefecture.

In August 2026, Mitsui Chemicals completed its US$900 million acquisition of Utah-based dental-products manufacturer Ultradent Products, making the company a wholly owned subsidiary. Regulatory approvals were completed ahead of schedule, allowing the transaction to close on August 14 rather than the originally planned September date. Mitsui Chemicals subsequently shifted global management functions for its oral-care business to a U.S.-based holding company as part of the integration.

== Products ==
Mitsui makes a wide range of chemicals, lubricants, and resins. One of the technologies owned by Mitsui Chemicals is the Hypol II process, which uses a miniature loop reactor to prepolymerize catalyst.

In the consumer space, they are known for MR Lenses, a high refractive index (1.74) corrective lens used in consumer eyeglasses. MR Lenses are used by large direct-to-consumer manufactures, including Zenni Optical.
