= Sulfur dye =

Type of dye manufactured for cotton

Sulfur dyes are the most commonly used dyes manufactured for cotton in terms of volume. They are inexpensive, generally have good wash-fastness, and are easy to apply. Sulfur dyes are predominantly black, brown, and dark blue. Red sulfur dyes are unknown, although a pink or lighter scarlet color is available.

== Organic Chemistry ==
Sulfur linkages are the integral part of chromophore in sulfur dyes. They are organosulfur compounds consisting of sulfide (−S−), disulfide (−S−S−) and polysulfide (−S_{n}−) links in heterocyclic rings. They feature thiazoles, thiazone, thianthrene, and phenothiazonethioanthrone subunits. Being nonionic, sulfur dyes are insoluble in water.

=== Process ===
Dyeing includes a few stages, viz. reduction, dyeing, washing, oxidation, soaping, and final washing. The anion is developed on reducing and solubilising at boil when it shows affinity for cellulose. Sodium sulfide (Na_{2}S), the reducing and solubilising agent, performs both reduction and solubilisation, producing thiols and then to sodium salt of thiols or thiolates, which are soluble in water and substantive towards cellulose. Higher rate of exhaustion occurs at 90–95 °C (194–203 °F) in presence of electrolyte. Dyed cellulosics exhibit a tendering effect on storage under humid atmosphere due to presence of excess free sulfur. Aftertreatment with sodium acetate is required to suppress that. H_{2}S liberated during dyeing forms corrosive metal sulfide. This restricts use of metal vessels except those made of stainless steel:

Fe + H_{2}S → FeS + H_{2}

== Production, past and present ==
The forerunner of sulfur dyes is said to be "Cachou de Laval", which was discovered by Groissant and Bretonniere in 1873 and is prepared by treating products with lignin (like sawdust or straw) with sulfide sources (like sodium hydroxide or sulphide mixed with sulphur). Subsequently, Henri-Raymond Vidal invented so-called Vidal Blacks in 1893 by reactions of various aniline derivatives with sulfur. These experiments demonstrated that deeply colored materials could be readily produced by combining aromatic compounds and sulfur sources.

The most important member of the class is Sulfur Black 1. It is produced by the reaction of 2,4-dinitrophenol and sodium sulfide in hot water. Like many sulfur dyes, details on the chemical reactions are poorly understood. It is accepted that the sulfide reduces the nitro groups to aniline derivatives, which are thought to form indophenol-containing intermediates that are further crosslinked by reaction with sulfur. The result are insoluble, high molecular weight species. Sulfur Black 1 is imperfectly understood, and the material is probably heterogeneous. It is speculated to be a polymer consisting of thianthrene and phenothiazine subunits. The so-called sulfur bake dyes are produced from 1,4-diaminobenzene and diaminotoluene derivatives. These dyes are proposed to consist of polymers with benzothiazole subunits. Members of the sulfur bake dyes class are Sulfur Orange 1, Sulfur Brown 21, and Sulfur Green 12.

Partial chemical structure of proposed for Sulfur Black 1.

== Application method ==
Sulfur dyes are water-insoluble. In the presence of a reducing agent and at alkaline pH at elevated temperature of around 80 °C (176 °F), the dye particles disintegrate, become water-soluble and hence can be absorbed by the fabric. Sodium sulfide or sodium hydrosulfide are suitable reducing agents. Common salt facilitates the absorption. After the fabric is removed from the dye solution, it is allowed to stand in air whereupon the dye is regenerated by oxidation. The regenerated parent dye is insoluble in water. Oxidation can also be effected in air or by hydrogen peroxide or sodium bromate in a mildly acidic solution.

The low water solubility is the basis of the good wash-fastness of these dyed fabrics. These dyes have good all-around colour fastness except to chlorine bleaches. Because the dye is water-insoluble, it will not bleed when washed in water and will not stain other clothes. The dye, however, may have poor fastness to rubbing. The dyes are bleached by hypochlorite bleach.

== Environmental issues ==
Due to the highly polluting nature of the dye-bath effluent, sulfur dyes are being slowly phased out in the West but they are used on a large scale in China. Recent advances in dyeing technologies have allowed the substitution of toxic sulfide reducing agents. Glucose in basic solution is now used and both low-sulfide and zero-sulfide products are available.
