= Propalene =

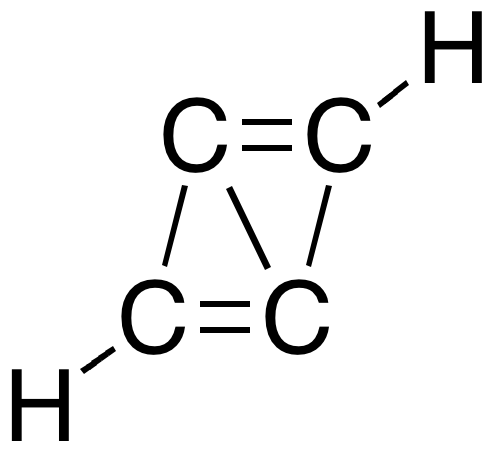

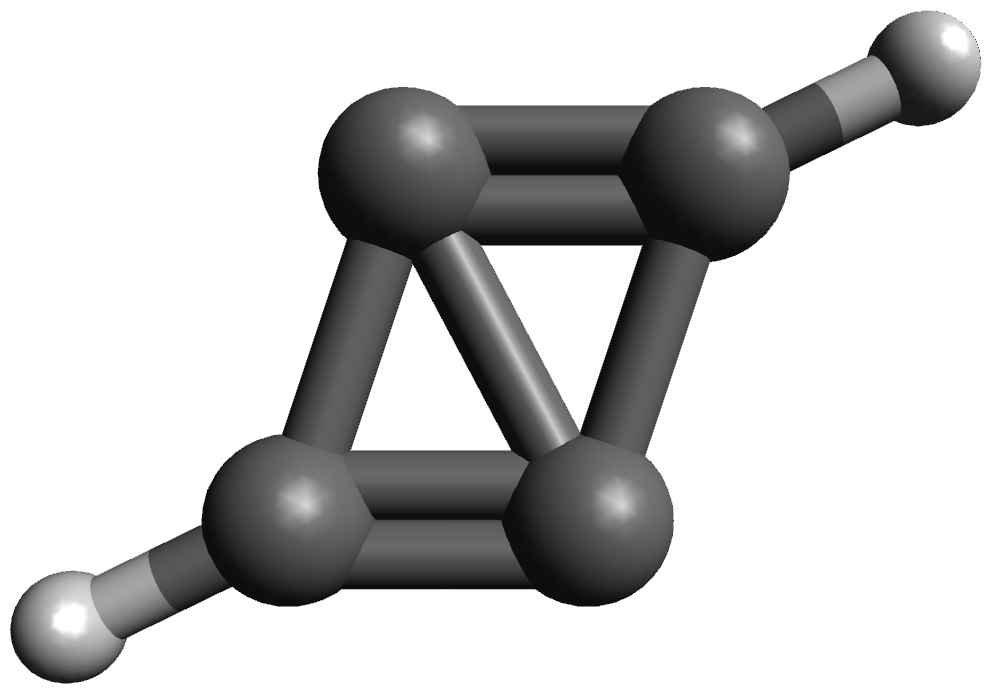

Names
- Preferred IUPAC name Bicyclo[1.1.0]buta-1,3-diene
- Other names Propalene, Bicyclobutadiene

Identifiers
CAS Number	13969-14-7
3D model (JSmol)	Interactive image
ChemSpider	35806075
PubChem CID	20577920
CompTox Dashboard (EPA)	DTXSID90608913
- InChI: InChI=1S/C4H2/c1-3-2-4(1)3/h1-2H Key: QYGHRDRLUMAIGS-UHFFFAOYSA-N
- SMILES: C1=C2C1=C2

Properties
Chemical formula	C_{4}H_{2}
Molar mass	50.060 g·mol^{−1}
- Except where otherwise noted, data are given for materials in their standard state (at 25 °C [77 °F], 100 kPa). (what is ?) Infobox references

Propalene or bicyclo[1.1.0]buta-1,3-diene is a theoretical polycyclic hydrocarbon composed of two fused cyclopropene rings. Computational studies indicate that the molecule would be planar, with the carbon framework forming a parallelogram that has distinctly alternating short and long carbon–carbon bonds.

== See also ==
- Butadiene
- Cyclobutadiene
- Bicyclobutane
- Butalene
- Pentalene
- Heptalene
- Octalene
