= Triafulvalene =

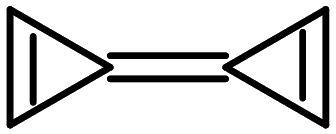

Names
- Preferred IUPAC name [1,1′-Bi(cyclopropylidene)]-2,2′-diene
- Other names 1,1′-Bi(cycloprop-2-en-1-ylidene)

Identifiers
CAS Number	1608-08-8
3D model (JSmol)	Interactive image
ChemSpider	35807295
PubChem CID	86179345
CompTox Dashboard (EPA)	DTXSID201032864
- InChI: InChI=1S/C6H4/c1-2-5(1)6-3-4-6/h1-4H Key: MRCIUZQRSIHAMG-UHFFFAOYSA-N
- SMILES: C=1C(C=1)=C2C=C2

Properties
Chemical formula	C_{6}H_{4}
Molar mass	76.098 g·mol^{−1}
- Except where otherwise noted, data are given for materials in their standard state (at 25 °C [77 °F], 100 kPa). Infobox references

Triafulvalene or cyclopropenylidenecyclopropene is a fulvalene hydrocarbon with chemical formula C_{6}H_{4}, composed of two linked cyclopropene rings. Triafulvalene has never been isolated, since it can decompose via an isodesmic reaction. However, its structure, stability, and spectral properties are well-studied theoretically; the molecule is believed planar.

== See also ==
- Calicene
- Fulvalene
- Sesquifulvalene
