= C4H2 =

The molecular formula C_{4}H_{2} (molar mass: 50.06 g/mol, exact mass: 50.01565 u) may refer to:

- Diacetylene, or butadiyne
- Propalene, or bicyclo[1.1.0]buta-1,3-diene
