= 1,4-Dioxin =

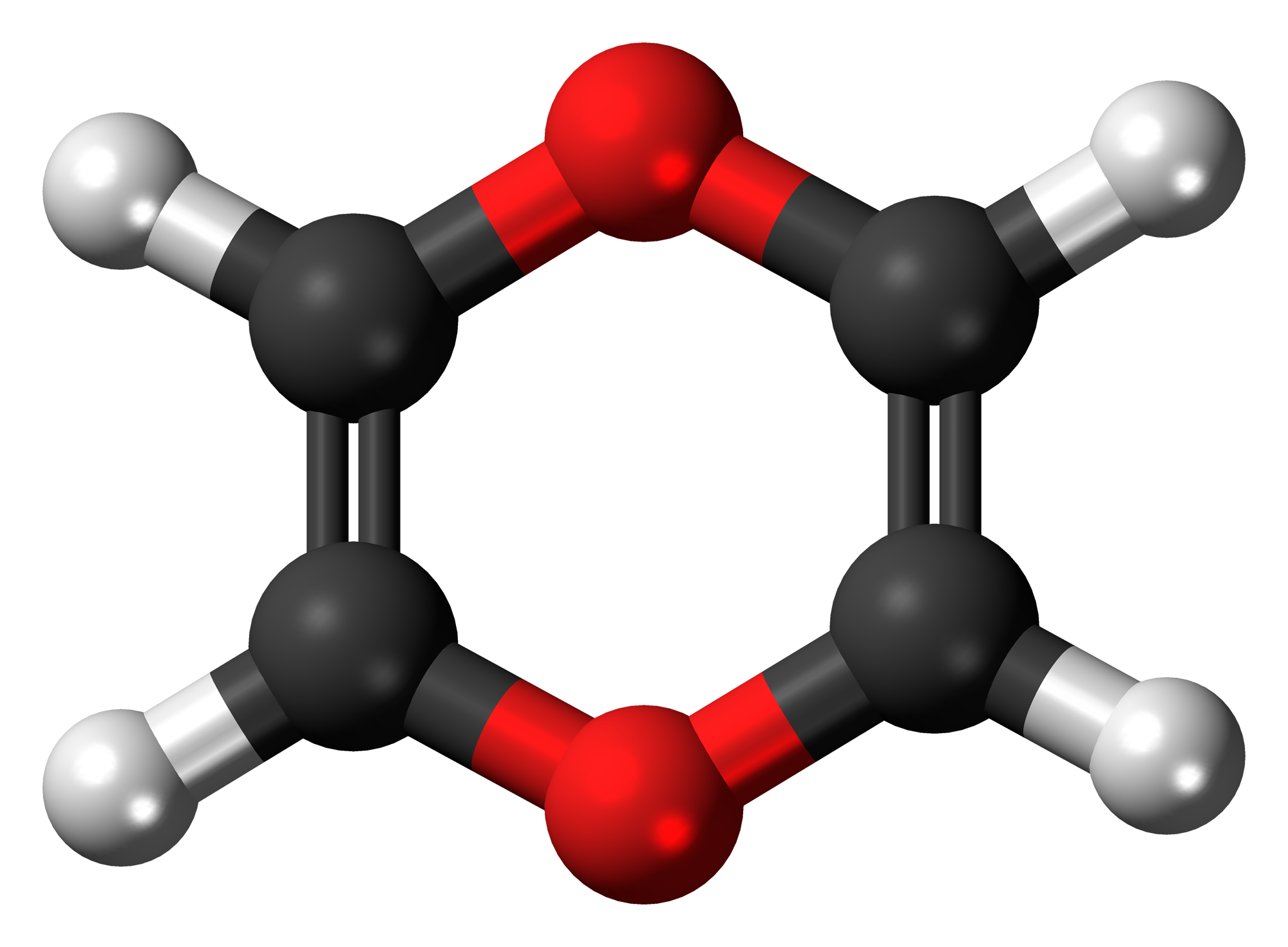

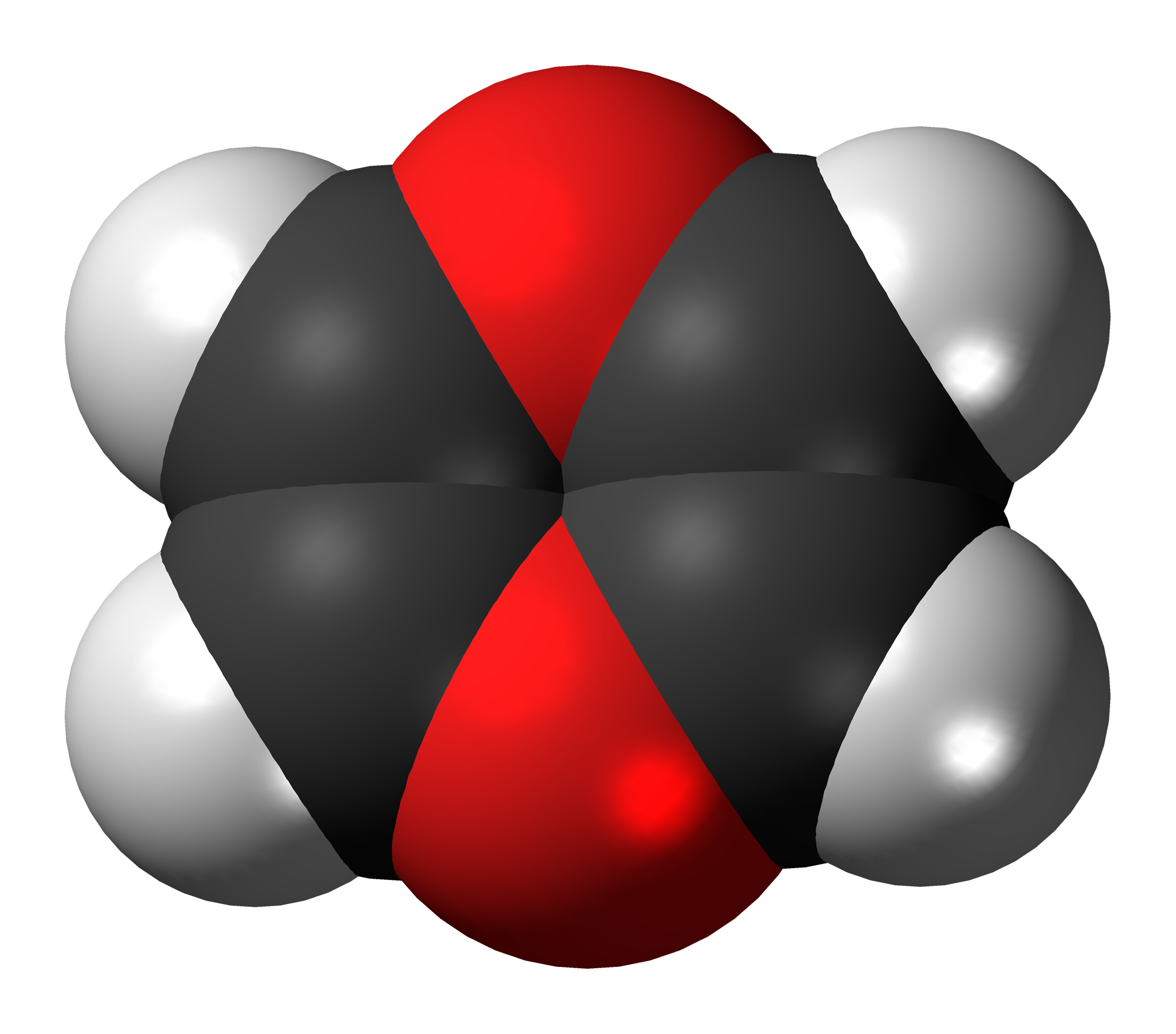

Names
- Preferred IUPAC name 1,4-Dioxine
- Systematic IUPAC name 1,4-Dioxacyclohexa-2,5-diene
- Other names 1,4-Dioxin; Dioxin p-Dioxin; 1,4-Dioxa[6]annulene

Identifiers
| CAS Number | 290-67-5 |
| 3D model (JSmol) | Interactive image |
| ChEBI | CHEBI:134044 |
| ChemSpider | 71301 |
| PubChem CID | 78968 |
| UNII | ZD32358XMG |
| CompTox Dashboard (EPA) | DTXSID10183191 |
- InChI: InChI=1S/C4H4O2/c1-2-6-4-3-5-1/h1-4H Key: KVGZZAHHUNAVKZ-UHFFFAOYSA-N; InChI=1/C4H4O2/c1-2-6-4-3-5-1/h1-4H Key: KVGZZAHHUNAVKZ-UHFFFAOYAD
- SMILES: O\1/C=C\O/C=C/1

Properties
| Chemical formula | C_{4}H_{4}O_{2} |
| Molar mass | 84.07 g/mol |
| Appearance | Colorless liquid |
| Boiling point | 75 °C (167 °F; 348 K) |

Hazards
- Occupational safety and health (OHS/OSH)
| Main hazards | highly flammable |

Related compounds
| Related compounds | 1,2-dioxin, dibenzodioxin dithiin |
- Except where otherwise noted, data are given for materials in their standard state (at 25 °C [77 °F], 100 kPa). verify (what is ?) Infobox references

1,4-Dioxin (also referred as dioxin or p-dioxin) is a heterocyclic, organic, non-aromatic compound with the chemical formula C_{4}H_{4}O_{2}. It is colorless and very flammable, and has a boiling point of 75 °C (348 K).

There is an isomeric form of 1,4-dioxin, 1,2-dioxin (or o-dioxin). 1,2-Dioxin is very unstable due to its peroxide-like characteristics.

The term "dioxin" is most commonly used for a family of derivatives of 1,4-dioxin, known as polychlorinated dibenzodioxins (PCDDs).

== Preparation ==
1,4-Dioxin can be prepared by cycloaddition, namely by the Diels–Alder reaction of furan and maleic anhydride. The adduct formed has a carbon-carbon double bond, which is converted to an epoxide. The epoxide then undergoes a retro-Diels–Alder reaction, forming 1,4-dioxin and regenerating maleic anhydride.

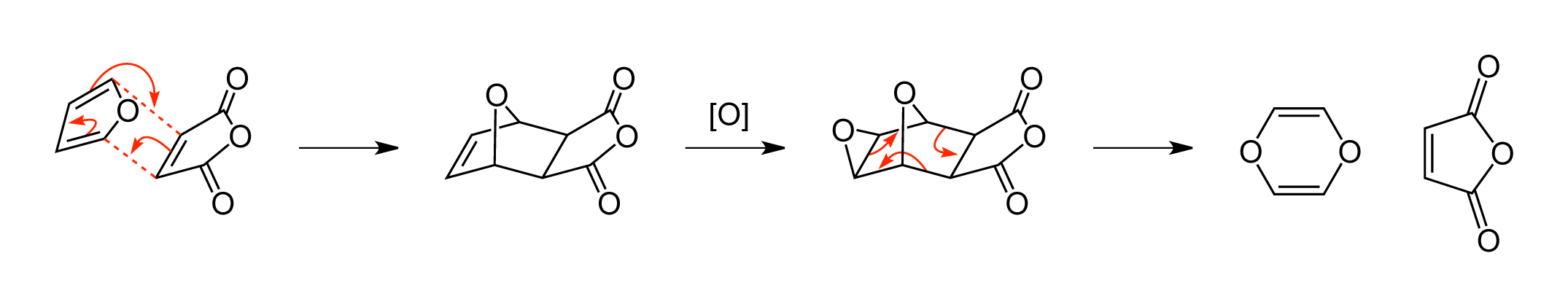

== Derivatives ==
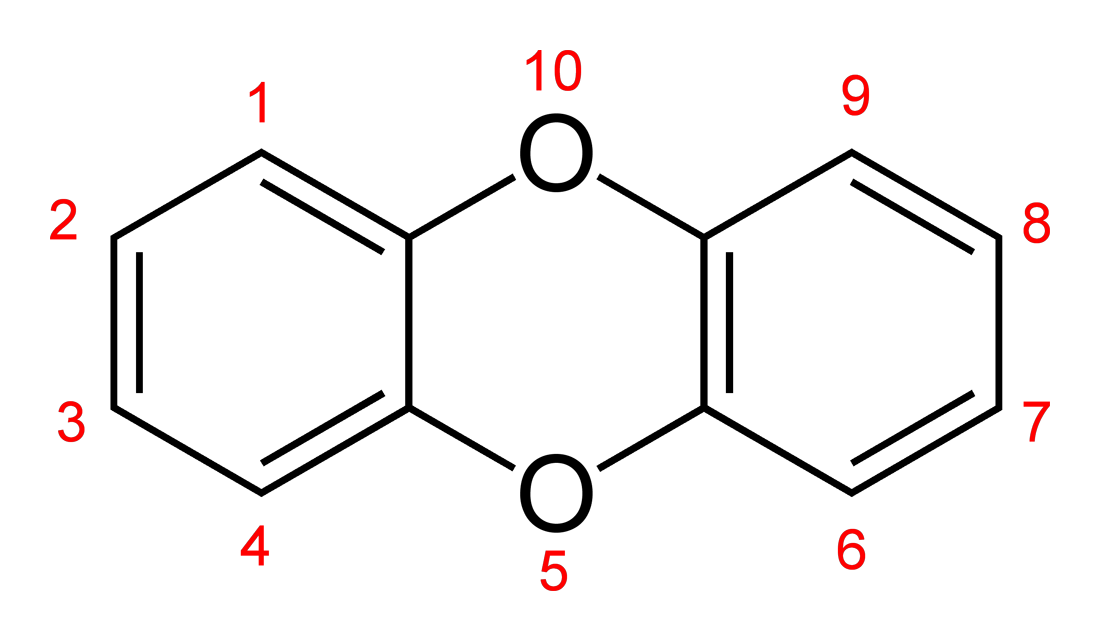
The skeletal formula and substituent numbering scheme of dibenzo-1,4-dioxin, the parent compound of PCDDs

The word "dioxin" can refer in a general way to compounds which have a dioxin core skeletal structure with substituent molecular groups attached to it. For example, dibenzo-1,4-dioxin is a compound whose structure consists of two benzo- groups fused onto a 1,4-dioxin ring.

=== Polychlorinated dibenzodioxins ===
Because of their extreme importance as environmental pollutants, current scientific literature uses the name dioxins commonly for simplification to denote the chlorinated derivatives of dibenzo-1,4-dioxin, more precisely the polychlorinated dibenzodioxins (PCDDs), among which 2,3,7,8-tetrachlorodibenzodioxin (TCDD), a tetrachlorinated derivative, is the best known. The polychlorinated dibenzodioxins, which can also be classified in the family of halogenated organic compounds, have been shown to bioaccumulate in humans and other organisms due to their lipophilic properties, and are known teratogens, mutagens, and carcinogens.

PCDDs are formed through combustion, chlorine bleaching and manufacturing processes. The combination of heat and chlorine creates dioxin. Since chlorine is often a part of the Earth's environment, natural ecological activity such as volcanic activity and forest fires can lead to the formation of PCDDs. Nevertheless, PCDDs are mostly produced by human activity.

Famous PCDD exposure cases include Agent Orange sprayed over vegetation by the British military in Malaya during the Malayan Emergency and the U.S. military in Vietnam during the Vietnam War, the Seveso disaster, and the poisoning of Viktor Yushchenko.

Polychlorinated dibenzofurans are a related class compounds to PCDDs which are often included within the general term "dioxins".
