= C16H8 =

The molecular formula C_{16}H_{8} (molar mass: 200.24 g/mol, exact mass: 200.0626 u) may refer to:

- Bicalicene
- Quadrannulene

== See also ==
- List of compounds with carbon number 16
