= C16H10 =

The molecular formula C_{16}H_{10} (molar mass: 202.25 g/mol, exact mass: 202.0783 u) may refer to:

- Dibenzopentalene
- Fluoranthene
- Pyrene
