= Bis(acetylacetonato)iron(II) =

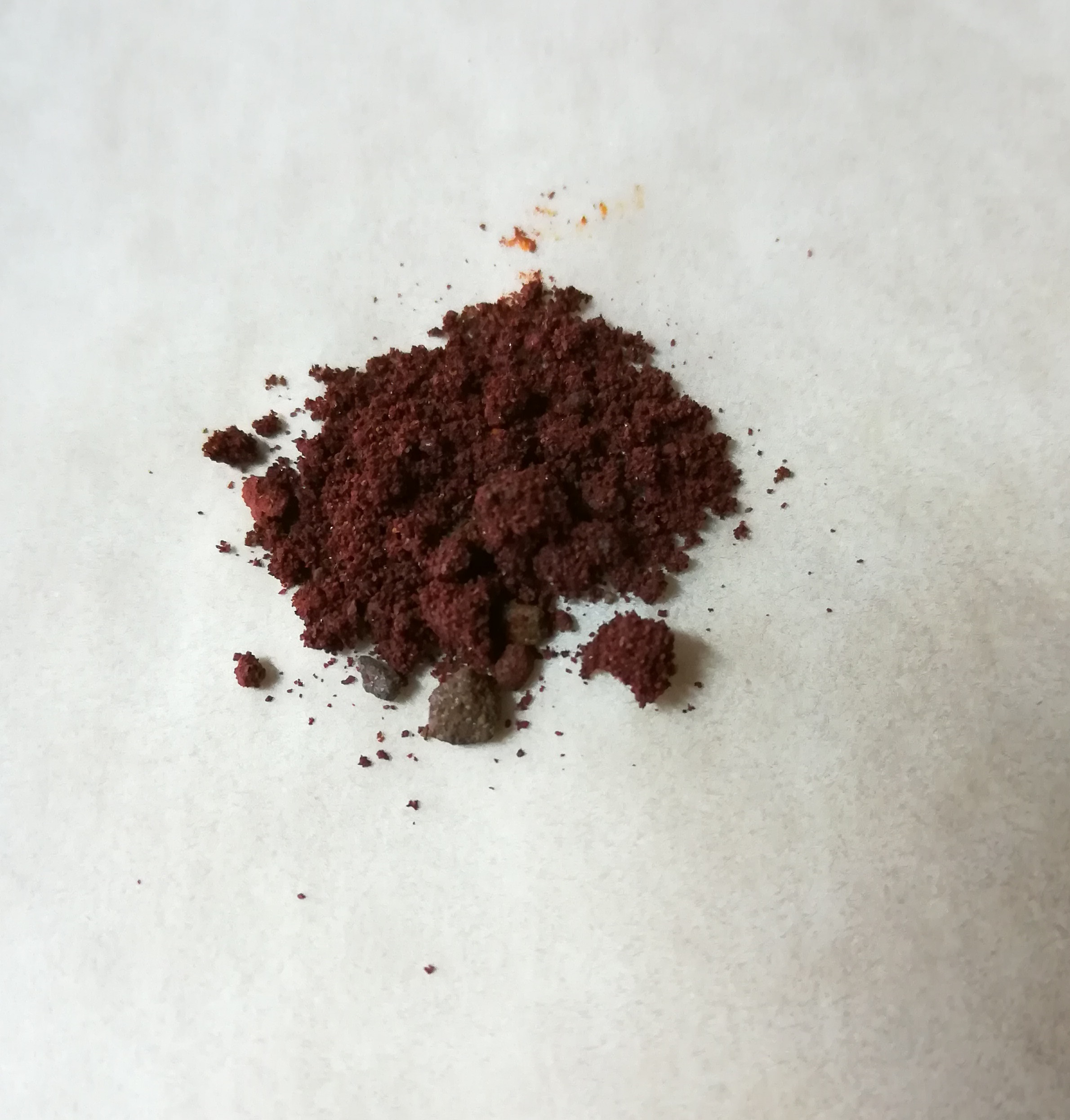

Names
- IUPAC name Bis(acetylacetonato)iron(II)
- Systematic IUPAC name Bis[(Z)-4-oxopent-2-en-2-olato-κ^{2}O,O′]iron(II)
- Other names Bis(2,4-pentanedionato)iron; Ferrous acetylacetonate Iron(II) 2,4-pentanedionate

Identifiers
| CAS Number | 14024-17-0 |
| 3D model (JSmol) | Interactive image; hydrate: Interactive image |
| ChemSpider | 4589054 |
| ECHA InfoCard | 100.034.397 |
| EC Number | 237-851-4 |
| PubChem CID | 5486775; hydrate: 134687727 |
| UNII | WS3J2LZ9RW |
- InChI: InChI=1S/2C5H8O2.Fe/c2*1-4(6)3-5(2)7;/h2*3,6H,1-2H3;/q;;+2/p-2/b2*4-3-; Key: LFORAFQNBQKDRY-FDGPNNRMSA-L; hydrate: InChI=1S/2C5H8O2.Fe.H2O/c2*1-4(6)3-5(2)7;;/h2*3,6H,1-2H3;;1H2/b4-3-;;; Key: XTPSXHDLJKIQTA-FGSKAQBVSA-N
- SMILES: C/C(=C/C(=O)C)/[O-].C/C(=C/C(=O)C)/[O-].[Fe+2]; hydrate: CC(=CC(=O)C)O.C/C(=C/C(=O)C)/O.O.[Fe]

Properties
| Chemical formula | C_{10}H_{14}FeO_{4} |
| Molar mass | 254.063 g·mol^{−1} |
| Melting point | 170–171 °C (338–340 °F; 443–444 K) |

Hazards
- GHS labelling
| Pictograms | (GHS07: Exclamation mark) |
| Signal word | Warning |
| Hazard statements | H315, H319, H335 |
| Precautionary statements | P261, P264, P264+P265, P271, P280, P302+P352, P304+P340, P305+P351+P338, P319, P321, P332+P317, P337+P317, P362+P364, P403+P233, P405, P501 |
- Except where otherwise noted, data are given for materials in their standard state (at 25 °C [77 °F], 100 kPa). Infobox references

Bis(acetylacetonato)iron(II) is a coordination complex with the formula [Fe(C_{5}H_{7}O_{2})_{2}]_{2}. It is a dark, nearly black, air-sensitive, sublimable solid. It can be prepared by treating ferrous salts with 2,4-pentanedione in presence of base.

== Structure ==
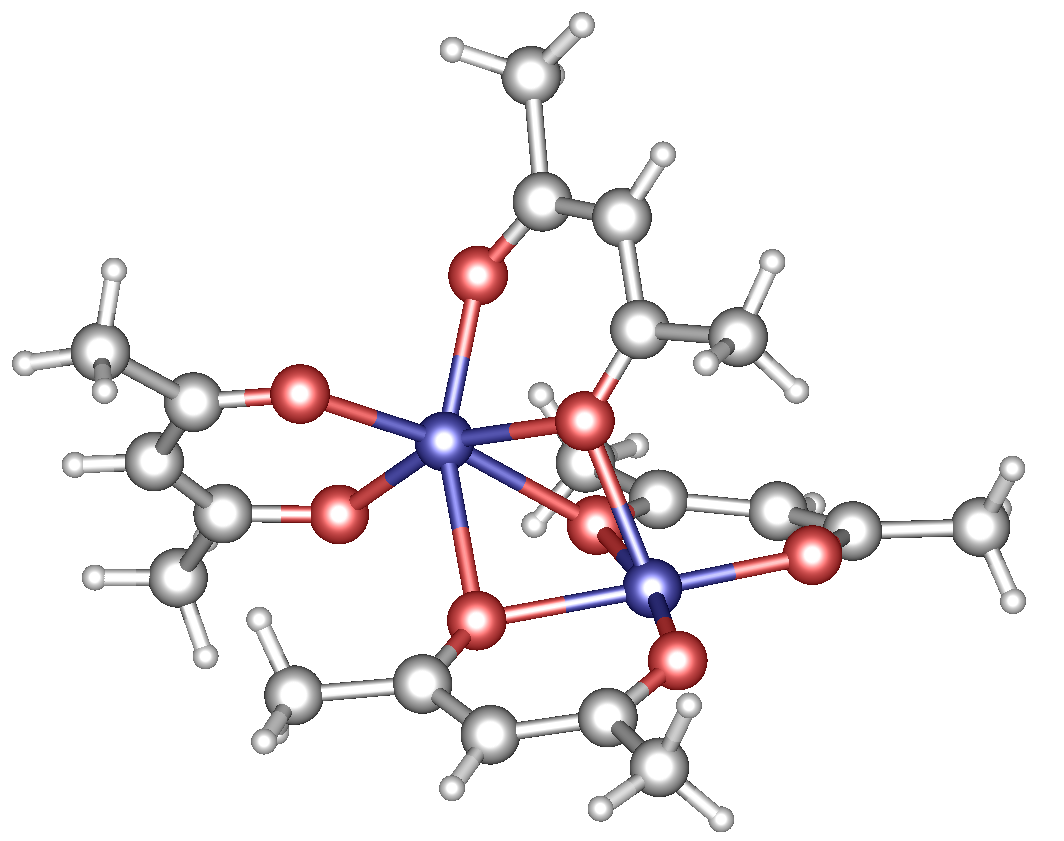
Structure of Fe_{2}(acetylacetonate)_{4} Color code: red = O, blue = Fe. The pentacoordinate Fe is on the left.

The structure of the complex has been confirmed by X-ray crystallography. As found for some other bis(acetylacetonates) (e.g., the nickel(II) and cobalt(II) derivatives), bis(acetylacetonato)iron(II) is not a monomer. It contains two Fe centers, one octahedral and one pentacoordinate. Three of the acetylacetonato ligands bridge the two Fe centers.

== Reactions ==
The dimeric structure of bis(acetylacetonato)iron(II) is readily cleaved by Lewis bases to give adducts Fe(C_{5}H_{7}O_{2})_{2}L_{2}. Examples include the dihydrate and the tmeda complex.

Bis(acetylacetonato)iron(II) is used as an anhydrous, "organic soluble" source of Fe(II). For example, it reacts with lithium bis(hydropentalenyl)iron to afford green [(C_{8}H_{7})Fe]_{2}-[(C_{8}H_{8})_{2}Fe], a quadruple-decker complex. It also reacts with Li_{2}Pn^{*}(TMEDA)_{x} (Pn^{*} = permethylpentalene) to yield purple-black Fe_{2}Pn^{*}_{2}.
