= Mesulfen =

Chemical compound

Clinical data
- AHFS/Drugs.com: International Drug Names
- ATC code: D10AB05 (WHO) P03AA03 (WHO) QP53AA01 (WHO)

Identifiers
- IUPAC name: 2,7-Dimethylthianthrene
- CAS Number: 135-58-0
- PubChem CID: 67272
- ChemSpider: 580870
- UNII: EG6V6W7WDD
- KEGG: D07212
- CompTox Dashboard (EPA): DTXSID0057962
- ECHA InfoCard: 100.004.730

Chemical and physical data
- Formula: C_{14}H_{12}S_{2}
- Molar mass: 244.37 g·mol^{−1}
- 3D model (JSmol): Interactive image
- SMILES: Cc1ccc2c(c1)Sc3ccc(cc3S2)C
- InChI: InChI=1S/C14H12S2/c1-9-3-5-11-13(7-9)15-12-6-4-10(2)8-14(12)16-11/h3-8H,1-2H3; Key:AHXDSVSZEZHDLV-UHFFFAOYSA-N

Mesulfen (2,7-dimethylthianthrene) is an anti-acne preparation, as well as a scabicide. It is a dimethyl derivative of thianthrene.
