= Fulvalenes =

Fulvalenes

A fulvalene is a hydrocarbon obtained by formally cross-conjugating two rings through a common exocyclic double bond. The name is derived from the similarly structured fulvenes which lack one ring. Pentafulvalene (2) is also called simply fulvalene, the parent structure of this class. Triapentafulvalene (3) is also known as calicene from the words calix or chalice because of its wine-glass appearance.

In general, the parent fulvalenes are very unstable; for instance, the parent triafulvalene (1) has never been synthesized. On the other hand, stable fulvalenes can be obtained by proper substitution or benzannulation. Several members should be stabilized taking into account a dipolar mesomeric form with for instance sesquifulvalene 4, which can be thought of as a tropylium cation joined to a cyclopentadienyl anion (both stable and aromatic). In this compound the dipolar structure is calculated to contribute 23% to the total structure.

== Fulvalenes as a ligand ==
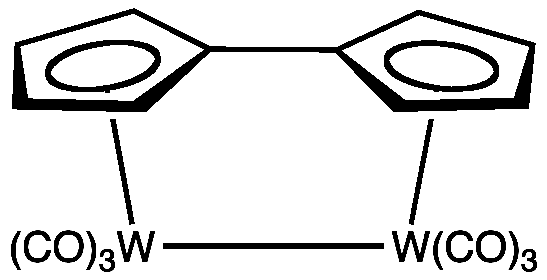
Tungsten fulvalene complex

Fulvalenes forms stable organometallic complexes that can be formally considered derivatives of the dianion C_{10}H_{8}^{2−}, akin to two bonded cyclopentadienyl anions. Ferrocene was isolated from an attempted synthesis of pentafulvalene. Many compounds are known, especially for the early transition metals. The bond joining the two rings in some fulvalene complexes can break reversibly.
