= Benzocyclobutadiene =

Names
- Preferred IUPAC name Bicyclo[4.2.0]octa-1,3,5,7-tetraene

Identifiers
CAS Number	4026-23-7
3D model (JSmol)	Interactive image
ChemSpider	70373
PubChem CID	77987
UNII	T7CEM83V4M
CompTox Dashboard (EPA)	DTXSID60193245
- InChI: InChI=1S/C8H6/c1-2-4-8-6-5-7(8)3-1/h1-6H Key: WHEATZOONURNGF-UHFFFAOYSA-N; InChI=1/C8H6/c1-2-4-8-6-5-7(8)3-1/h1-6H Key: WHEATZOONURNGF-UHFFFAOYAK
- SMILES: C12=CC=CC=C1C=C2

Properties
Chemical formula	C_{8}H_{6}
Molar mass	102.136 g·mol^{−1}
- Except where otherwise noted, data are given for materials in their standard state (at 25 °C [77 °F], 100 kPa). verify (what is ?) Infobox references

Benzocyclobutadiene is the simplest polycyclic hydrocarbon, being composed of an aromatic benzene ring fused to an anti-aromatic cyclobutadiene ring. It has chemical formula C_{8}H_{6}. Though the benzene ring is stabilized by aromaticity, the cyclobutadiene portion has a destabilizing effect. This results into it being a non-aromatic compound - neither behaving as aromatic nor an antiaromatic one. For this reason, benzocyclobutadiene will readily dimerize or polymerize and it reacts as a dienophile in Diels-Alder reactions.

Benzocyclobutadiene is used in the production of the pharmaceutical drug naflocort.

== See also ==
- Pentalene
