= Octalene =

Names
- IUPAC name Octalene

Identifiers
| CAS Number | 257-55-6 |
| 3D model (JSmol) | Interactive image |
| ChEBI | CHEBI:33084 |
| ChemSpider | 119852 |
| EC Number | 206-215-8 |
| PubChem CID | 136075 |
| UNII | X4JL62R2HN |
- InChI: InChI=1S/C14H12/c1-2-6-10-14-12-8-4-3-7-11-13(14)9-5-1/h1-12H/b2-1-,4-3-,5-1-,6-2-,7-3-,8-4-,9-5-,10-6-,11-7-,12-8-,13-9-,13-11-,14-10-,14-12-,14-13- Key: OVPVGJFDFSJUIG-VFLSUHNHSA-N; InChI=1/C14H12/c1-2-6-10-14-12-8-4-3-7-11-13(14)9-5-1/h1-12H/b2-1-,4-3-,5-1-,6-2-,7-3-,8-4-,9-5-,10-6-,11-7-,12-8-,13-9-,13-11-,14-10-,14-12-,14-13- Key: OVPVGJFDFSJUIG-VFLSUHNHBC
- SMILES: C1=CC=CC2=C(C=C1)C=CC=CC=C2

Properties
| Chemical formula | C_{14}H_{12} |
| Molar mass | 180.250 g·mol^{−1} |
- Except where otherwise noted, data are given for materials in their standard state (at 25 °C [77 °F], 100 kPa). (what is ?) Infobox references

Octalene is a polycyclic hydrocarbon composed of two fused cyclooctatetraene rings.

== Anions ==
Octalene can be readily reduced by lithium to a dianion C_{14}H^{2−}_{12} and, unusually for such a small molecule, a tetraanion C_{14}H^{4−}_{12}. The di-anion has its two negative charges in one ring, converting that ring into a 10-pi electron aromatic system similar to the di-anion of cyclooctatetraene. In the 18-pi electron tetra-anion, both rings effectively have access to 10 pi electrons, leading to a planar, bicyclic aromatic structure analogous to that of naphthalene.

== See also ==
- Propalene
- Benzyne
- Pentalene
- Heptalene
- Butalene
