= Selenanthrene =

Names
- Other names diselenaanthracene

Identifiers
CAS Number	262-30-6
3D model (JSmol)	Interactive image
ChEMBL	ChEMBL1977348
ChemSpider	119855
PubChem CID	136078
CompTox Dashboard (EPA)	DTXSID30949074
- InChI: InChI=1S/C12H8Se2/c1-2-6-10-9(5-1)13-11-7-3-4-8-12(11)14-10/h1-8H Key: IESITBBFRHFJKD-UHFFFAOYSA-N
- SMILES: C1=CC=C2C(=C1)[Se]C3=CC=CC=C3[Se]2

Properties
Chemical formula	C_{12}H_{8}Se_{2}
Molar mass	310.138 g·mol^{−1}
Appearance	colorless solid
Density	1.97 g/cm^{3}
Melting point	181–182 °C (358–360 °F; 454–455 K)
Dipole moment	1.42 D (benzene solution, 25 °C)
- Except where otherwise noted, data are given for materials in their standard state (at 25 °C [77 °F], 100 kPa). Infobox references

Selenanthrene is an organoselenium compound with the formula (C_{6}H_{4})_{2}Se_{2}. It consists of a pair of benzene rings linked by a pair of selenium atoms. It is analogous to thianthrene, (C_{6}H_{4})_{2}S_{2}.

It adopts a folded shape of dihedral angle 125° owing to the C–Se–C angles of 97–98°. The central six-atom ring takes on a boat conformation, which rapidly inverts via a planar transition state. Oxidation of selenanthrene gives selenoxides, which are reagents for the dehydrogenation of alkenes.
