= Dibenzo-1,4-dioxin =

Dibenzo-p-dioxin
- Dibenzodioxin

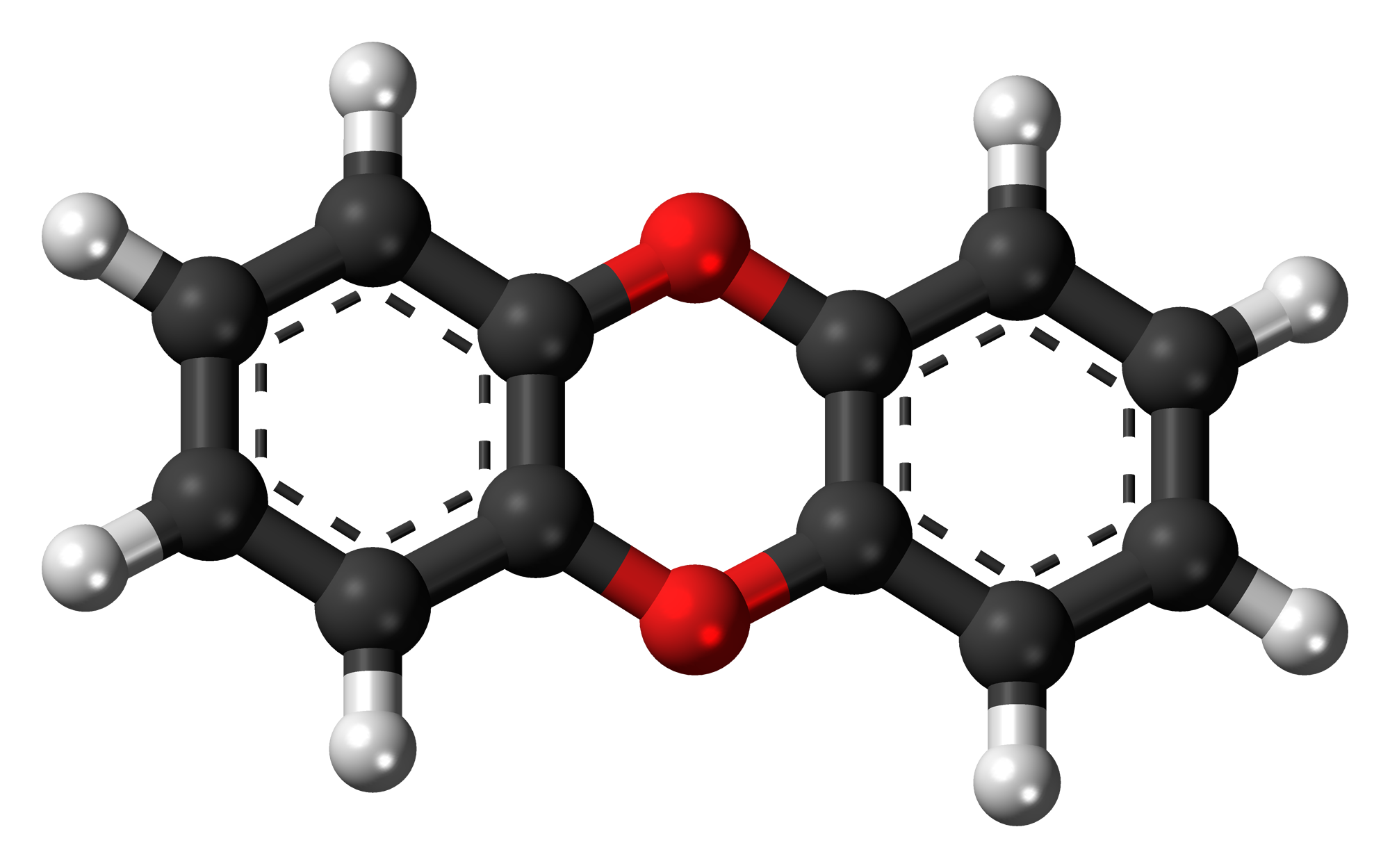

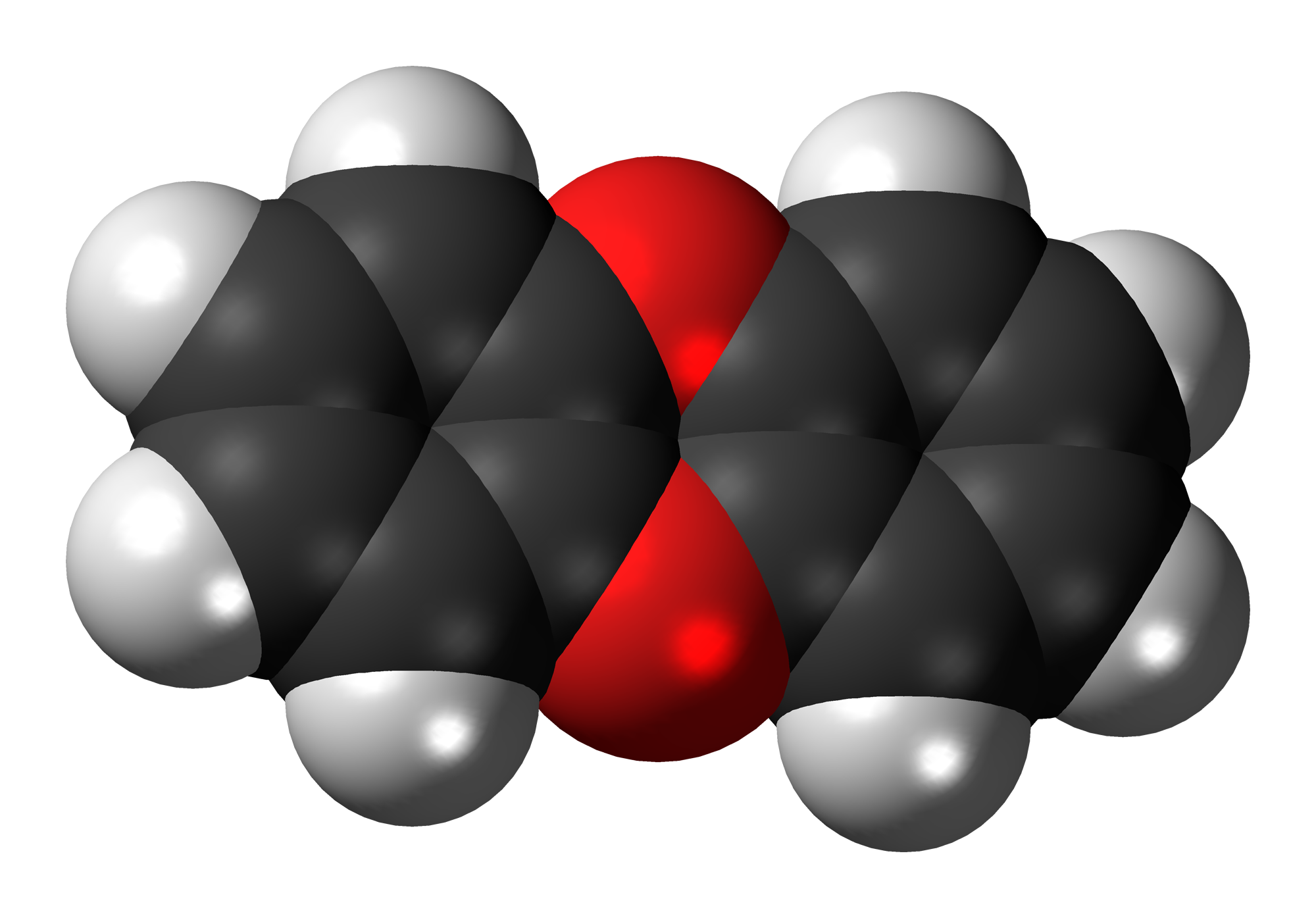

Names
- Preferred IUPAC name Oxanthrene
- Other names Dibenzodioxin, Dibenzo-p-dioxin, Dibenzo-1,4-dioxin

Identifiers
CAS Number	262-12-4
3D model (JSmol)	Interactive image
Beilstein Reference	143227
ChEBI	CHEBI:28891
ChEMBL	ChEMBL3184198
ChemSpider	8861
ECHA InfoCard	100.005.432
EC Number	205-974-2
Gmelin Reference	280302
KEGG	C07732
PubChem CID	9216
UNII	O1B5KJ235I
UN number	3077
CompTox Dashboard (EPA)	DTXSID8020410
- InChI: InChI=1S/C12H8O2/c1-2-6-10-9(5-1)13-11-7-3-4-8-12(11)14-10/h1-8H Key: NFBOHOGPQUYFRF-UHFFFAOYSA-N; InChI=1/C12H8O2/c1-2-6-10-9(5-1)13-11-7-3-4-8-12(11)14-10/h1-8H Key: NFBOHOGPQUYFRF-UHFFFAOYAJ
- SMILES: O1c3c(Oc2c1cccc2)cccc3

Properties
Chemical formula	C_{12}H_{8}O_{2}
Molar mass	184.194 g·mol^{−1}
Appearance	White crystals
Density	1.243 kg/m^{3}
Melting point	122 °C (252 °F; 395 K)
Boiling point	283.5 °C (542.3 °F; 556.6 K)
Solubility in water	0.901 g/L (25 °C)

Hazards
- GHS labelling
Pictograms	(GHS07: Exclamation mark) (GHS09: Environmental hazard)
Signal word	Warning
Hazard statements	H302, H411
Precautionary statements	P264, P270, P273, P301+P312, P330, P391, P501
- Lethal dose or concentration (LD, LC)
LD_{50} (median dose)	866 mg/kg (mouse, oral)

Related compounds
Related compounds	Polychlorinated dibenzodioxins ("dioxin"), Dioxins and dioxin-like compounds, Dibenzofuran, Thianthrene
- Except where otherwise noted, data are given for materials in their standard state (at 25 °C [77 °F], 100 kPa). verify (what is ?) Infobox references

Dibenzo-1,4-dioxin, also dibenzodioxin or dibenzo-p-dioxin (dibenzo-para-dioxin), is a polycyclic heterocyclic organic compound in which two benzene rings are connected by a 1,4-dioxin ring. Its molecular formula is C_{12}H_{8}O_{2}. The two oxygen atoms occupy opposite (para-) positions in the six-membered dioxin ring.

Dibenzodioxin is the carbon skeleton of the poisonous polychlorinated dibenzodioxins (PCDDs), often called dioxins. The most harmful PCDD is 2,3,7,8-tetrachlorodibenzodioxin (TCDD). Dioxins and dioxin-like compounds is a category of pollutants that includes PCDDs and other compounds that have similar structure, toxicity, and persistence. Dibenzodioxin is also the skeleton of the polybrominated dibenzodioxins.

== Isomer ==
The general name dibenzodioxin usually refers to dibenzo-p-dioxin.

Dibenzo-o-dioxin (dibenzo-1,2-dioxin)

The isomeric compound dibenzo-o-dioxin (dibenzo-ortho-dioxin) or dibenzo-1,2-dioxin, like the unstable 1,2-dioxin, has two adjacent oxygen atoms (ortho-). No detailed information is available on this isomer, but it is expected to be highly unstable, with peroxide-like characteristics.

== See also ==
- Thianthrene, the sulfur analog of dibenzodioxin
