= Dibenzopentalene =

Names
- Preferred IUPAC name Indeno[2,1-a]indene

Identifiers
CAS Number	248-58-8
3D model (JSmol)	Interactive image
ChemSpider	4936522
PubChem CID	6431184
UNII	H2UXS49XQ2
CompTox Dashboard (EPA)	DTXSID50424035
- InChI: InChI=1S/C16H10/c1-3-7-13-11(5-1)9-15-14-8-4-2-6-12(14)10-16(13)15/h1-10H Key: OZEPXROCWSMGGM-UHFFFAOYSA-N
- SMILES: C1=C2C(=CC3=C2C=CC=C3)C2=CC=CC=C12

Properties
Chemical formula	C_{16}H_{10}
Molar mass	202.256 g·mol^{−1}
- Except where otherwise noted, data are given for materials in their standard state (at 25 °C [77 °F], 100 kPa). Infobox references

Dibenzopentalene (dibenzo[a,e]pentalene or dibenzo[b,f]pentalene) is an organic compound and a hydrocarbon with formula C_{16}H_{10}. It is of some scientific interest as a stable derivative of the highly reactive antiaromatic pentalene by benzannulation. The first derivative was synthesised in 1912 by Brand. The parent compound was reported in 1952. The NICS value for the 5-membered rings is estimated at 7.4 ppm and that of the six-membered rings -9.8 ppm. Aromatic dicationic salts can be obtained by reaction with antimony pentafluoride in sulfuryl chloride. The dianion forms by reduction with lithium metal or deprotonation of 5,10-dihydroindeno[2,1-a]indene with two equivalents of butyllithium. The aromatic nature of the dianion has been confirmed by X-ray analysis. Another isomer of this compound exists called dibenzo[a,f]pentalene with one of the benzene rings positioned on the other available pentalene face.
