= Dithiin =

Class of heterocyclic compounds

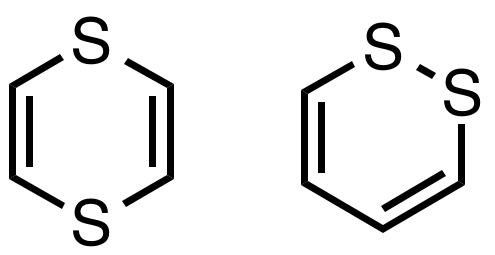
Structures of 1,4-dithiin and 1,2-dithiin.

Dithiins /daɪ.ˈθaɪ.ɪnz/ are a class of heterocyclic compounds, with the parent members having the formula (C_{2}H_{2})_{2}S_{2}. Two isomers of this parent are recognized, 1,2- and 1,4-dithiins. Planar dithiins are 8π e^{−} systems, which would lead to antiaromaticity if the structure was planar. Akin to the behavior of cyclooctatetraene, they instead adopt nonplanar structures. Vinyldithiin, a common component of garlic, is a misnomer for 3-vinyl-4H-1,2-dithiin. 1,3-dithiins are unknown.

== 1,4-Dithiins ==
1,4-Dithiins have been more extensively studied. They are usually prepared by condensation of the equivalent of α-mercaptocarbonyls. For example, the acetal HSCH_{2}CH(OEt)_{2} converts upon heating to the parent 1,4-dithiin. They are nonplanar, typically adopting a boat conformation, and can be oxidized to their radical cations. Photolysis leads to dimerization via a [2+2] cycloaddition. Thianthrene is dibenzo-1,4-dithiin.

== 1,2-Dithiins ==
1,2-Dithiins are isomers of but-2-ene-dithials. They tend to be unstable with respect to loss of sulfur and formation of the thiophene derivative:

C_{4}R_{4}S_{2} → C_{4}R_{4}S + "S"

They are often claret-colored. Some occur as flower pigments in plants of the family Asteraceae.
