= 1,2-Dioxin =

- Skeletal formula of 1,2-dioxin

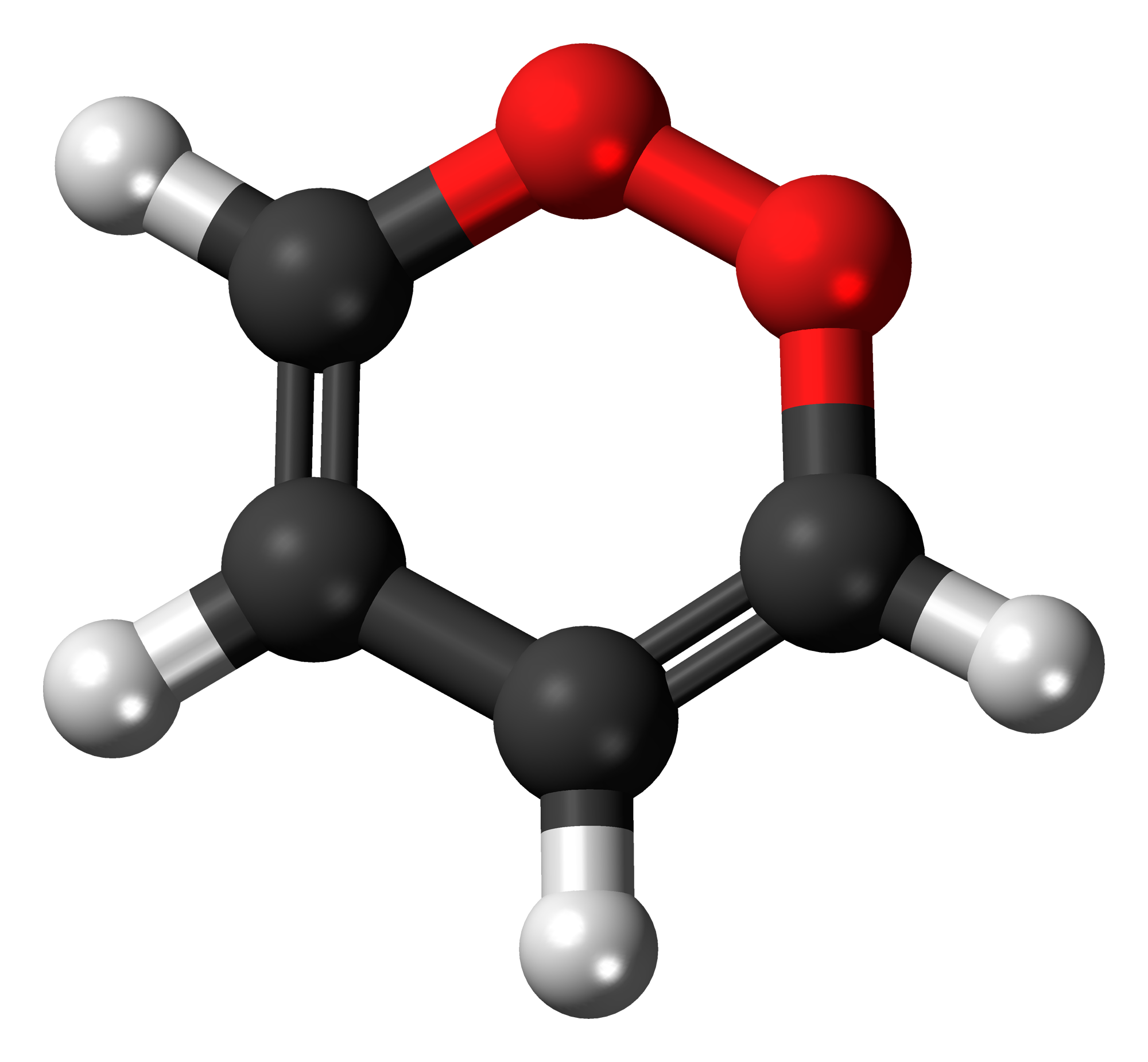

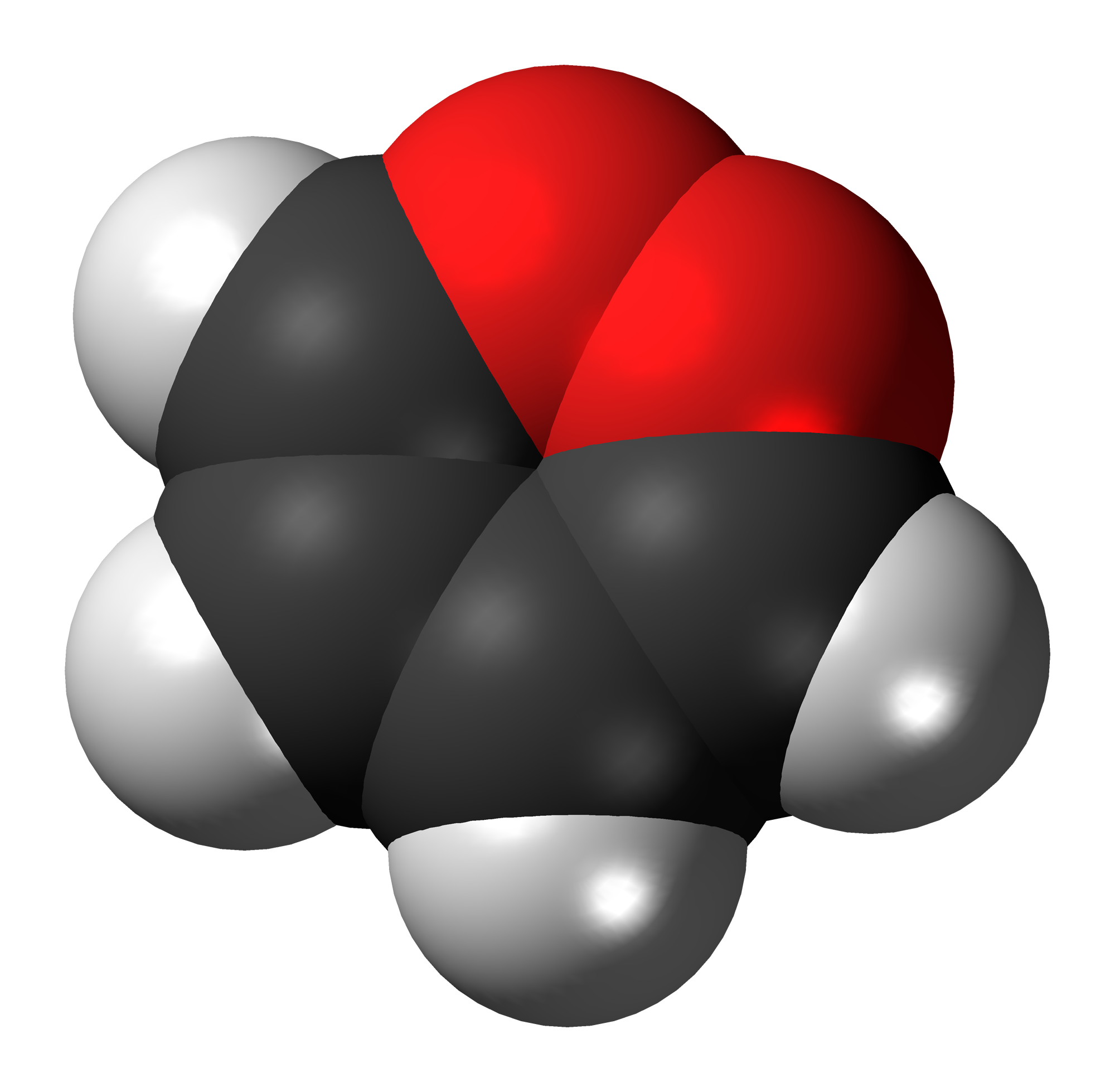

Names
- Preferred IUPAC name 1,2-Dioxine
- Systematic IUPAC name 1,2-Dioxacyclohexa-3,5-diene

Identifiers
CAS Number	289-87-2
3D model (JSmol)	Interactive image
ChemSpider	10606250
PubChem CID	15559065
UNII	R8H79L3J69
CompTox Dashboard (EPA)	DTXSID90574144
- InChI: InChI=1S/C4H4O2/c1-2-4-6-5-3-1/h1-4H Key: VCZQYTJRWNRPHF-UHFFFAOYSA-N; InChI=1/C4H4O2/c1-2-4-6-5-3-1/h1-4H Key: VCZQYTJRWNRPHF-UHFFFAOYAH
- SMILES: O1OC=CC=C1

Properties
Chemical formula	C_{4}H_{4}O_{2}
Molar mass	84.074 g·mol^{−1}

Related compounds
Related compounds	Dibenzodioxin 1,4-Dioxin
- Except where otherwise noted, data are given for materials in their standard state (at 25 °C [77 °F], 100 kPa). verify (what is ?) Infobox references

1,2-Dioxin is a heterocyclic, organic, antiaromatic compound with the chemical formula C_{4}H_{4}O_{2}. It is an isomeric form of 1,4-dioxin (or p-dioxin).

Due to its peroxide-like characteristics, 1,2-dioxin is very unstable and has not been isolated. Calculations suggest that it would isomerize rapidly into but-2-enedial. Even substituted derivatives, such as 1,4-diphenyl-2,3-benzodioxin, are very labile.

In 1990, 3,6-bis(p-tolyl)-1,2-dioxin (1) was incorrectly reported as the first stable derivative. It was subsequently shown that the initial compound was not a derivative of 1,2-dioxin, but a thermodynamically more stable dione.

1,2-Dioxin (left) and 1,4-dioxin (right)

Structure of the transient 1,4-diphenyl-2,3-benzodioxin

Dioxin (1) and dione form (2)
