= High-refractive-index polymer =

Polymer with refractive index > 1.50

A high-refractive-index polymer (HRIP) is a polymer that has a refractive index greater than 1.50.

Such materials are required for anti-reflective coating and photonic devices such as light emitting diodes (LEDs) and image sensors. The refractive index of a polymer is based on several factors which include polarizability, chain flexibility, molecular geometry and the polymer backbone orientation.

As of 2004, the highest refractive index for a polymer was 1.76. Substituents with high molar fractions or high-n nanoparticles in a polymer matrix have been introduced to increase the refractive index in polymers.

== Properties ==
=== Refractive index ===
A typical polymer has a refractive index of 1.30–1.70, but a higher refractive index is often required for specific applications. The refractive index is related to the molar refractivity, structure and weight of the monomer. In general, high molar refractivity and low molar volumes increase the refractive index of the polymer.

=== Optical properties ===
Optical dispersion is an important property of an HRIP. It is characterized by the Abbe number. A high refractive index material will generally have a small Abbe number, or a high optical dispersion. A low birefringence has been required along with a high refractive index for many applications. It can be achieved by using different functional groups in the initial monomer to make the HRIP. Aromatic monomers both increase refractive index and decrease the optical anisotropy and thus the birefringence.

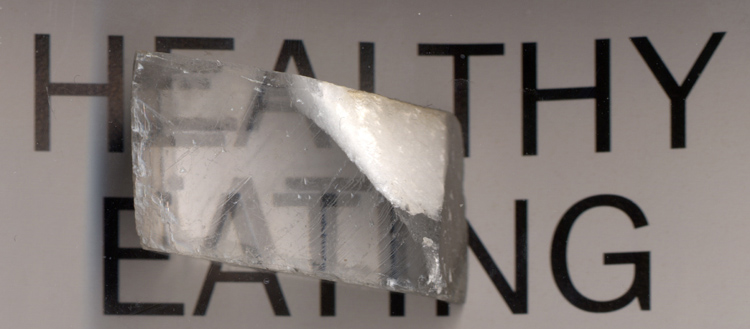
Example of birefringence

A high clarity (optical transparency) is also desired in a high refractive index polymer. The clarity is dependent on the refractive indexes of the polymer and of the initial monomer.

=== Thermal stability ===
When looking at thermal stability, the typical variables measured include glass transition, initial decomposition temperature, degradation temperature and the melting temperature range. The thermal stability can be measured by thermogravimetric analysis and differential scanning calorimetry. Polyesters are considered thermally stable with a degradation temperature of 410 °C. The decomposition temperature changes depending on the substituent that is attached to the monomer used in the polymerization of the high refractive index polymer. Thus, longer alkyl substituents results in lower thermal stability.

=== Solubility ===
Most applications favor polymers which are soluble in as many solvents as possible. Highly refractive polyesters and polyimides are soluble in common organic solvents such as dichloromethane, methanol, hexanes, acetone and toluene.

== Synthesis ==
The synthesis route depends on the HRIP type. The Michael polyaddition is used for a polyimide because it can be carried out at room temperature and can be used for step-growth polymerization. This synthesis was first succeeded with polyimidothiethers, resulting in optically transparent polymers with high refractive index. Polycondensation reactions are also common to make high refractive index polymers, such as polyesters and polyphosphonates.

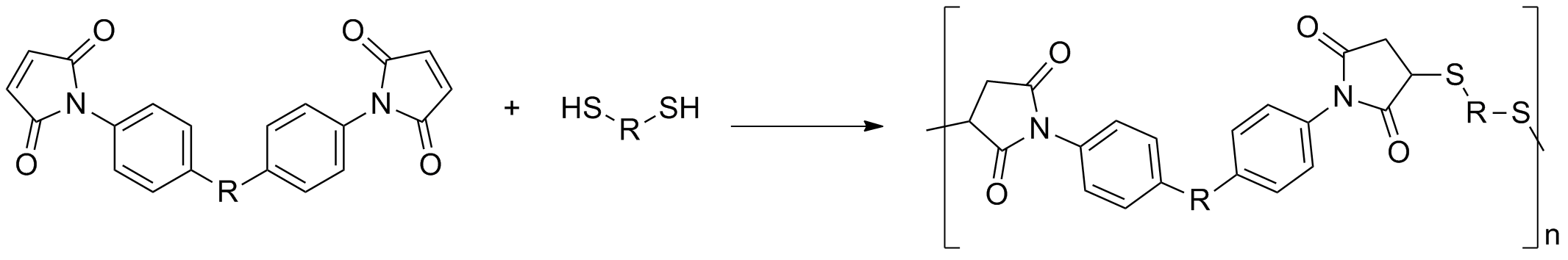
Example of a Michael polyaddition

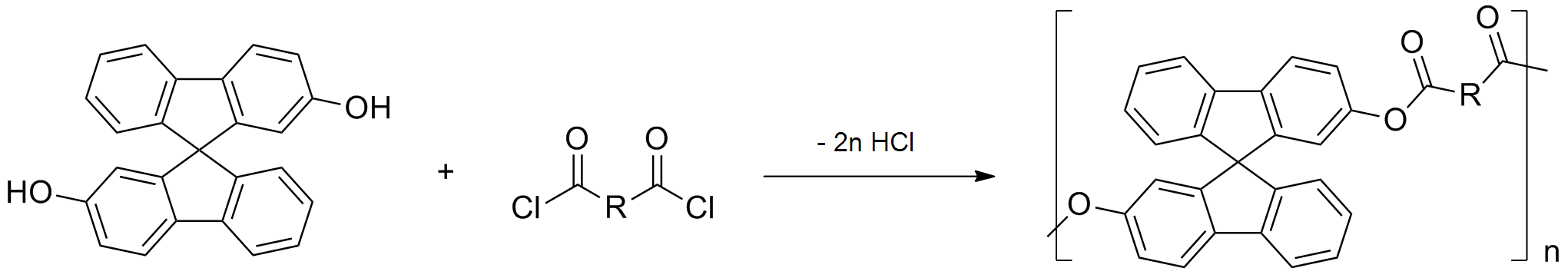
Example of a polycondensation

== Types ==
High refractive indices have been achieved either by introducing substituents with high molar refractions (intrinsic HRIPs) or by combining high-n nanoparticles with polymer matrixes (HRIP nanocomposites).

=== Intrinsic HRIP ===
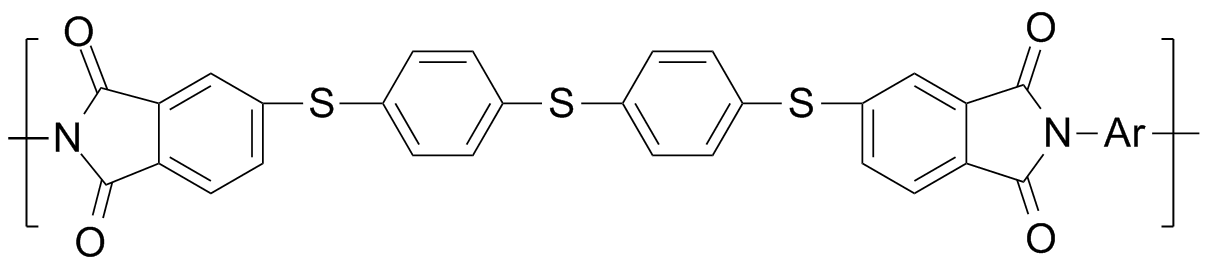
A sulfur-containing polyimide with high refractive index

Sulfur-containing substituents including linear thioether and sulfone, cyclic thiophene, thiadiazole and thianthrene are the most commonly used groups for increasing refractive index of a polymer. Polymers with sulfur-rich thianthrene and tetrathiaanthracene moieties exhibit n values above 1.72, depending on the degree of molecular packing.

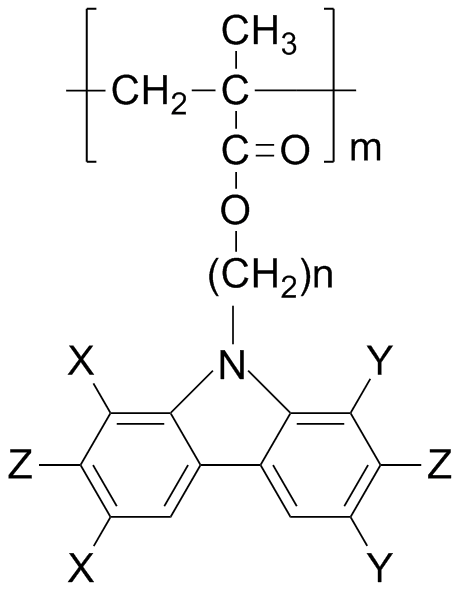
A halogen-containing polymethacrylate

Halogen elements, especially bromine and iodine, were the earliest components used for developing HRIPs. In 1992, Gaudiana et al. reported a series of polymethylacrylate compounds containing lateral brominated and iodinated carbazole rings. They had refractive indices of 1.67–1.77 depending on the components and numbers of the halogen substituents. However, recent applications of halogen elements in microelectronics have been severely limited by the WEEE directive and RoHS legislation adopted by the European Union to reduce potential pollution of the environment.

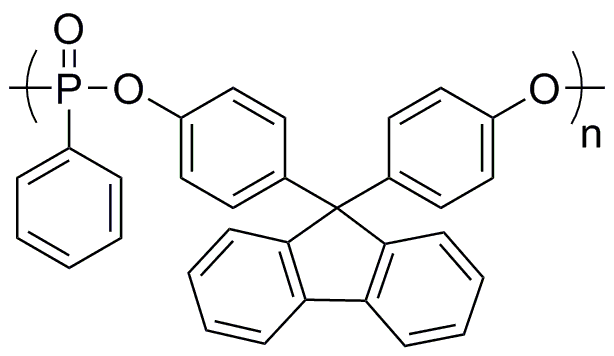
A polyphosphonate

Phosphorus-containing groups, such as phosphonates and phosphazenes, often exhibit high molar refractivity and optical transmittance in the visible light region. Polyphosphonates have high refractive indices due to the phosphorus moiety even if they have chemical structures analogous to polycarbonates. Shaver et al. reported a series of polyphosphonates with varying backbones, reaching the highest refractive index reported for polyphosphonates at 1.66. In addition, polyphosphonates exhibit good thermal stability and optical transparency; they are also suitable for casting into plastic lenses.

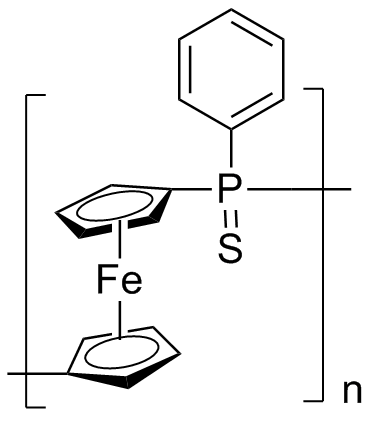
Organometallic HRIP

Organometallic components result in HRIPs with good film forming ability and relatively low optical dispersion. Polyferrocenylsilanes and polyferrocenes containing phosphorus spacers and phenyl side chains show unusually high n values (n=1.74 and n=1.72). They might be good candidates for all-polymer photonic devices because of their intermediate optical dispersion between organic polymers and inorganic glasses.

=== HRIP nanocomposite ===
Hybrid techniques which combine an organic polymer matrix with highly refractive inorganic nanoparticles could result in high n values. The factors affecting the refractive index of a high-n nanocomposite include the characteristics of the polymer matrix, nanoparticles and the hybrid technology between inorganic and organic components. The refractive index of a nanocomposite can be estimated as ${n_{comp}} = {\Phi_p}{n_p} + {\Phi_{org}}{n_{org}}$, where ${n_{comp}}$, ${n_p}$ and ${n_{org}}$ stand for the refractive indices of the nanocomposite, nanoparticle and organic matrix, respectively. ${\Phi_p}$ and ${\Phi_{org}}$ represent the volume fractions of the nanoparticles and organic matrix, respectively. The nanoparticle load is also important in designing HRIP nanocomposites for optical applications, because excessive concentrations increase the optical loss and decrease the processability of the nanocomposites. The choice of nanoparticles is often influenced by their size and surface characteristics. In order to increase optical transparency and reduce Rayleigh scattering of the nanocomposite, the diameter of the nanoparticle should be below 25 nm. Direct mixing of nanoparticles with the polymer matrix often results in the undesirable aggregation of nanoparticles – this is avoided by modifying their surface. The most commonly used nanoparticles for HRIPs include TiO_{2} (anatase, n=2.45; rutile, n=2.70), ZrO_{2} (n=2.10), amorphous silicon (n=4.23), PbS (n=4.20) and ZnS (n=2.36). Polyimides have high refractive indexes and thus are often used as the matrix for high-n nanoparticles. The resulting nanocomposites exhibit a tunable refractive index ranging from 1.57 to 1.99.

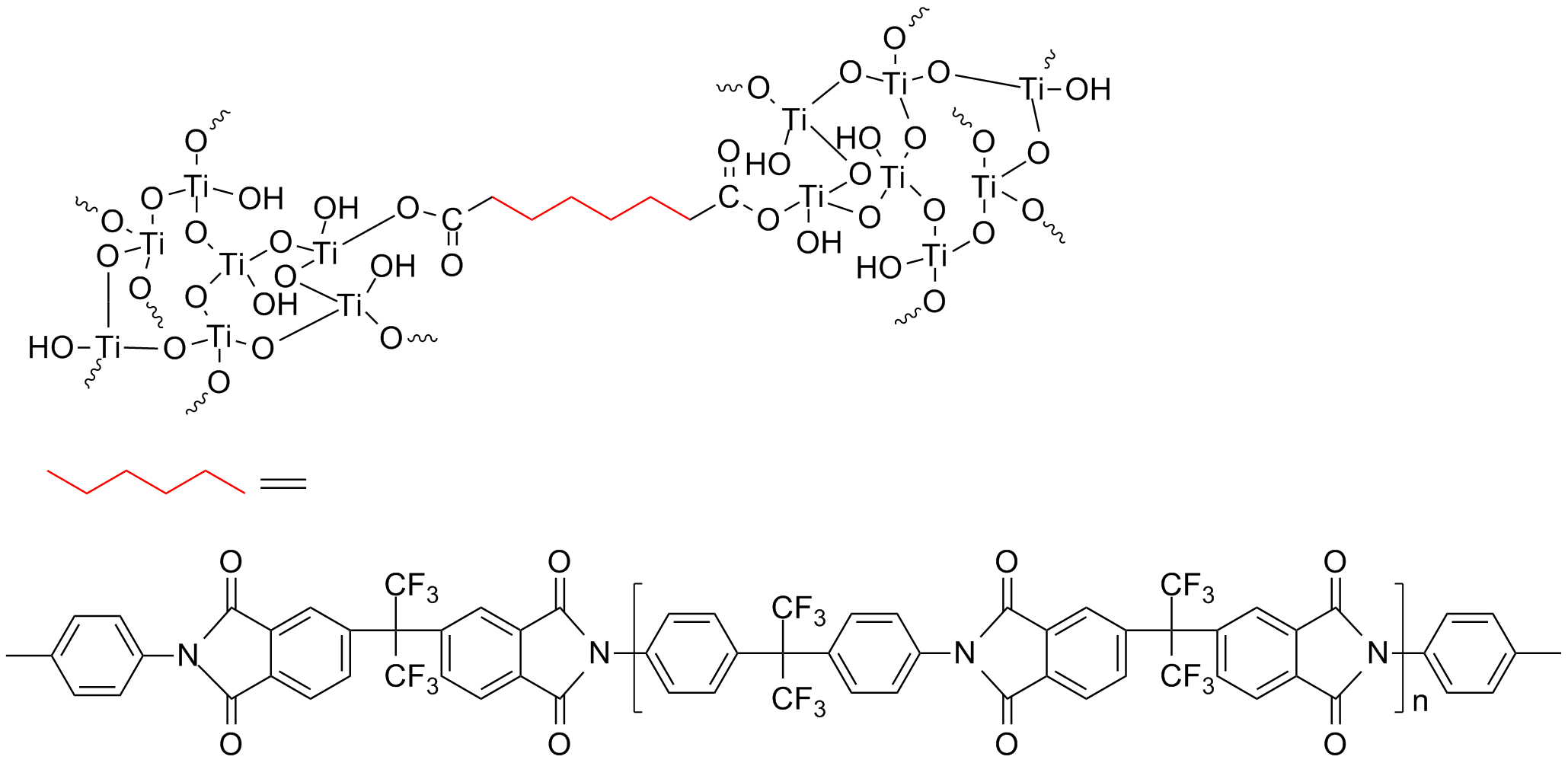
High-n polyimide nanocomposite

== Applications ==
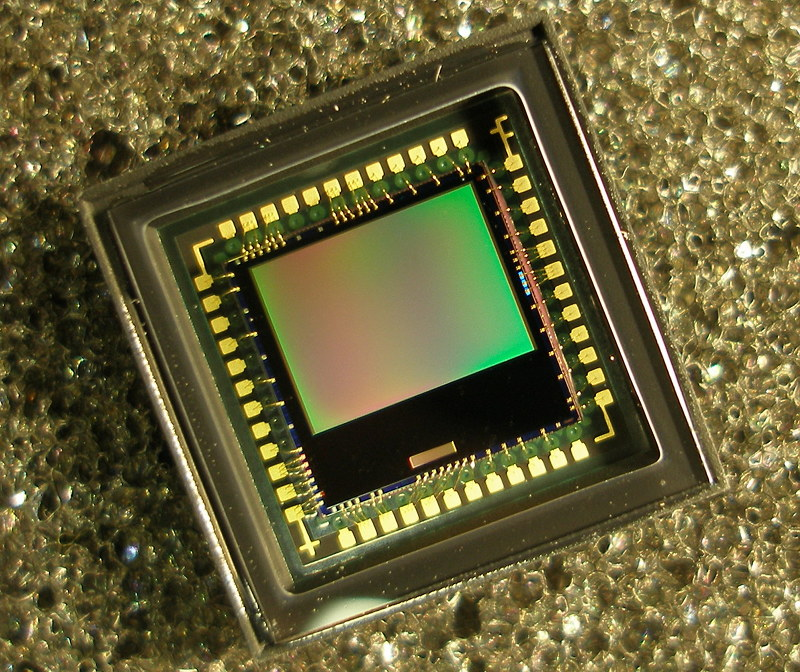
A CMOS image sensor

=== Image sensors ===
A microlens array is a key component of optoelectronics, optical communications, CMOS image sensors and displays. Polymer-based microlenses are easier to make and are more flexible than conventional glass-based lenses. The resulting devices use less power, are smaller in size and are cheaper to produce.

=== Lithography ===
Another application of HRIPs is in immersion lithography. In 2009 it was a new technique for circuit manufacturing using both photoresists and high refractive index fluids. The photoresist needs to have an n value of greater than 1.90. It has been shown that non-aromatic, sulfur-containing HRIPs are the best materials for an optical photoresist system.

=== LEDs ===
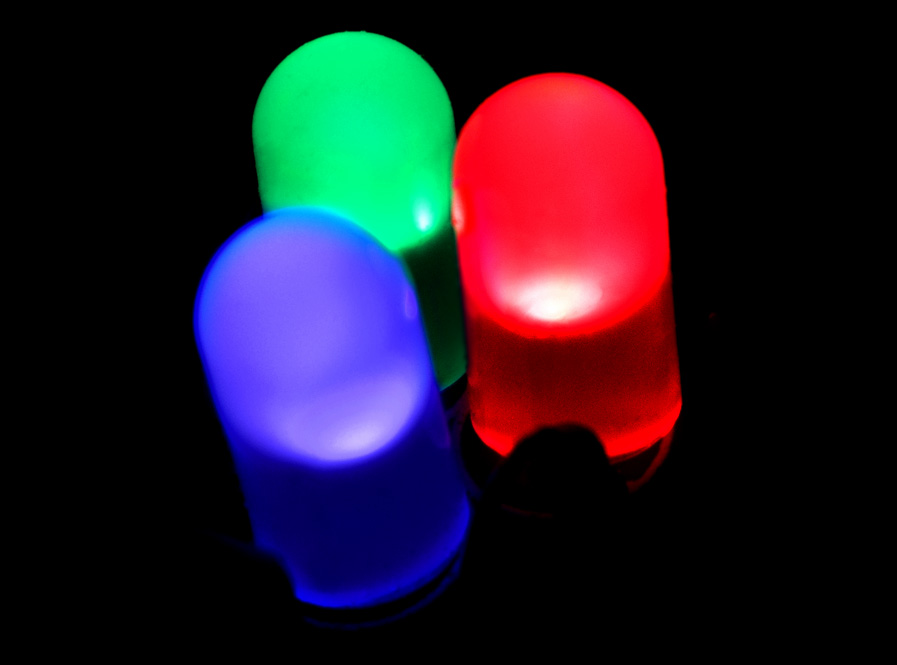
LEDs of the 5mm diffused type

Light-emitting diodes (LEDs) are a common solid-state light source. High-brightness LEDs (HBLEDs) are often limited by the relatively low light extraction efficiency due to the mismatch of the refractive indices between the LED material (GaN, n=2.5) and the organic encapsulant (epoxy or silicone, n=1.5). Higher light outputs can be achieved by using an HRIP as the encapsulant.

== See also ==
- Refractive index
- Refractometer
- Abbe number
- Optoelectronics
- Polarizability
- Birefringence
- Lorentz-Lorenz equation
- Dispersion
- Optical anisotropy
- Nanocomposite
- Image sensor
- Immersion lithography
- Organic light emitting diode (OLED)
