= Biferrocene =

Organometallic compound

Names
- IUPAC name 1,1"-Biferrocene

Identifiers
CAS Number	1287-38-3
3D model (JSmol)	Interactive image
ChemSpider	10157133
PubChem CID	11984633
- InChI: InChI=1S/C10H8.2C5H5.2Fe/c1-2-6-9(5-1)10-7-3-4-8-10;2*1-2-4-5-3-1;;/h1-8H;2*1-5H;;/q-6;2*-1;; Key: CEMHVYUXQJEPPO-UHFFFAOYSA-N
- SMILES: C1=C[CH-]C=C1.[Fe+2].C2=C[C-](C=C2)[C-](C=C3)C=C3.[Fe+2].C1=C[CH-]C=C1

Properties
Chemical formula	C_{20}H_{18}Fe_{2}
Molar mass	370.054 g·mol^{−1}
Appearance	dark orange solid
Melting point	239–240 °C (462–464 °F; 512–513 K)
- Except where otherwise noted, data are given for materials in their standard state (at 25 °C [77 °F], 100 kPa). Infobox references

Biferrocene is the organometallic compound with the formula [(C_{5}H_{5})Fe(C_{5}H_{4})]_{2}. It is the product of the formal dehydrocoupling of ferrocene, analogous the relationship between biphenyl and benzene. It is an orange, air-stable solid that is soluble in nonpolar organic solvents.

Biferrocene can be prepared by the Ullmann coupling of iodoferrocene. Its one-electron oxidized derivative [(C_{5}H_{5})Fe(C_{5}H_{4})]_{2}^{+} attracted attention as a prototypical mixed-valence compound.

A related compound is biferrocenylene, [Fe(C_{5}H_{4})_{2}]_{2} wherein all cyclopentadienyl rings are coupled into two fulvalene ligands.

== Reactions ==
Biferrocene can easily be converted into a mixed-valence complex, which is called biferrocenium. This [Fe(II)-Fe(III)] cation is a class II type (0.707 > α > 0) mixed-valence complex according to the Robin-Day classification.

== Derivatives ==
Aminophosphine ligands with biferroceno substituents have been prepared as catalysts for asymmetric allylic substitution and asymmetric hydrogenation of alkenes.

== Related compounds ==
- Bis(fulvalene)diiron
