= Benzocyclooctatetraene =

Names
- Preferred IUPAC name (5Z,7Z,9Z)-Benzo[8]annulene

Identifiers
CAS Number	265-49-6
3D model (JSmol)	Interactive image
ChemSpider	10745992
PubChem CID	53431173
UNII	A8QA42UT4F
CompTox Dashboard (EPA)	DTXSID60700312
- InChI: InChI=1S/C12H10/c1-2-4-8-12-10-6-5-9-11(12)7-3-1/h1-10H Key: LSNYJLGMVHJXPD-UHFFFAOYSA-N
- SMILES: c1cccc2\C=C/C=C\C=C/c12

Properties
Chemical formula	C_{12}H_{10}
Molar mass	154.212 g·mol^{−1}
- Except where otherwise noted, data are given for materials in their standard state (at 25 °C [77 °F], 100 kPa). Infobox references

Benzocyclooctatetraene is a polycyclic hydrocarbon with chemical formula C_{12}H_{10}, composed of fused a benzene ring and a cyclooctatetraene ring. Only the benzene ring is aromatic in this compound.

== Method to preparation ==
- ring-opening of benzotricyclooctadiene
- ultraviolet irradiation of benzobicyclo[2.2.2]octatriene
- 1,2-dehydrocyclooctatetraene method.

== See also ==
- Heptalene
