= Naflocort =

Chemical compound

Clinical data
- Other names: SQ-26490; 9α-Fluoro-1',4'-dihydro-11β,21-dihydroxy-2'betaH-naphtho(2',3':16α,17α)pregna-1,4-diene-3,20-dione
- Drug class: Corticosteroid; Glucocorticoid

Identifiers
- IUPAC name: (4aS,4bR,5S,6aS,6bS,12aS,13aS,13bS)-4b-Fluoro-6b-glycoloyl-5-hydroxy-4a,6a-dimethyl-4a,4b,5,6,6a,6b,7,12,12a,13,13a,13b,14,15-tetradecahydro-2H-benzo[5,6]indeno[2,1-a]phenanthren-2-one
- CAS Number: 59497-39-1 80738-47-2 (monohydrate)
- PubChem CID: 6917657
- ChemSpider: 5292887
- UNII: 1V2C47TW7H
- KEGG: D05104
- ChEMBL: ChEMBL2107160
- CompTox Dashboard (EPA): DTXSID90208194

Chemical and physical data
- Formula: C_{29}H_{33}FO_{4}
- Molar mass: 464.577 g·mol^{−1}
- 3D model (JSmol): Interactive image
- SMILES: C[C@]12C[C@@H]([C@]3([C@H]([C@@H]1C[C@@H]4[C@]2(CC5=CC=CC=C5C4)C(=O)CO)CCC6=CC(=O)C=C[C@@]63C)F)O
- InChI: InChI=1S/C29H33FO4/c1-26-10-9-21(32)12-19(26)7-8-22-23-13-20-11-17-5-3-4-6-18(17)14-28(20,25(34)16-31)27(23,2)15-24(33)29(22,26)30/h3-6,9-10,12,20,22-24,31,33H,7-8,11,13-16H2,1-2H3/t20-,22+,23+,24+,26+,27+,28-,29+/m1/s1; Key:IAHHOCLLSLZUNW-LDLSTMIQSA-N

Naflocort (developmental code name SQ-26490) is a synthetic glucocorticoid corticosteroid which was never marketed.
