= Butalene =

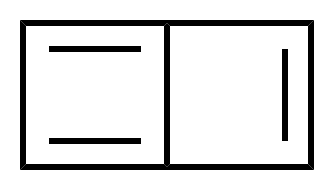

Names
- Preferred IUPAC name Bicyclo[2.2.0]hexa-1,3,5-triene
- Other names Butalene

Identifiers
CAS Number	1552-98-3
3D model (JSmol)	Interactive image; Interactive image
PubChem CID	3030745
UNII	G5XZV75YZL
CompTox Dashboard (EPA)	DTXSID801047368
- InChI: InChI=1S/C6H4/c1-2-6-4-3-5(1)6/h1-4H Key: YHCJOCYHUDCVQI
- SMILES: c1cc2ccc12; C=1C=C2C=CC=12

Properties
Chemical formula	C_{6}H_{4}
Molar mass	76.098 g·mol^{−1}
- Except where otherwise noted, data are given for materials in their standard state (at 25 °C [77 °F], 100 kPa). verify (what is ?) Infobox references

Butalene is a polycyclic hydrocarbon composed of two fused cyclobutadiene rings. A reported possible synthesis of it involves an elimination reaction from a Dewar benzene derivative. The structure itself can be envisioned as benzene with an internal bridge, and calculations indicate it is somewhat less stable than the open 1,4-didehydrobenzene biradical, the valence isomer in which that bridged bond is broken.

== Structure and bonding ==
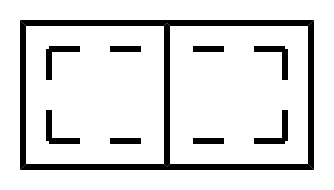
Resonance is significant around the perimeter rather than through the middle.

Ab initio calculations indicate butalene has a planar geometry and, in keeping with a planar structure with 6 π-electron configuration, is aromatic. Thus, the most significant π bonding interactions involve conjugation around the periphery of the whole six-atom structure, similar to benzene, rather than cross-ring resonance along the bridging bond. Significant resonance around one or the other four-membered ring alone would be a less-stable antiaromatic form, as is seen in cyclobutadiene itself.

== See also ==
- Propalene
- Pentalene
- Heptalene
- Octalene
