= Calicene =

Chemical compound

Names
- Preferred IUPAC name 5-(Cycloprop-2-en-1-ylidene)cyclopenta-1,3-diene
- Other names Triapentafulvalene

Identifiers
CAS Number	6249-23-6
3D model (JSmol)	Interactive image
ChemSpider	26537418
PubChem CID	12302244
UNII	23W88U3WAK
CompTox Dashboard (EPA)	DTXSID60486629
- InChI: InChI=1S/C8H6/c1-2-4-7(3-1)8-5-6-8/h1-6H Key: ZXWMPJFQZJXFQN-UHFFFAOYSA-N
- SMILES: C1(C=CC=C1)=C2C=C2

Properties
Chemical formula	C_{8}H_{6}
Molar mass	102.136 g·mol^{−1}
Solubility in water	none in water
- Except where otherwise noted, data are given for materials in their standard state (at 25 °C [77 °F], 100 kPa). Infobox references

Calicene or triapentafulvalene is a hydrocarbon of the fulvalene class with chemical formula C_{8}H_{6}, composed of a cyclopentadiene ring and a cyclopropene ring linked by a double bond. Its name is derived from the Latin calix meaning "goblet", from its shape.

== Properties ==
Very high resonance energy is predicted by the Hückel method, however its resonance energy is not high. The central double bond is polarized with a partial positive charge on the carbon atom of triangular ring and a partial negative charge on the carbon atom of pentagonal ring, in keeping with added Hückel's rule stability of rings containing 2 π electrons and 6 π electrons respectively. Calicene's dipole moment has been computed to be 4.66 D. Several compounds that contain two or more calicene subunits are aromatic, such as trans-bicalicene (ring compound) or poly-2,7-[N]calicenes (chain compound)

Despite several attempts to prepare it, the parent calicene has so far defied attempts at synthesis. However, 1,2,3,4,5,6-hexaphenylcalicene has been prepared and an experimental dipole moment of 6.3 D was measured.

== See also ==
- Bicalicene
- Triafulvalene
- Sesquifulvalene
