= Fulvalene =

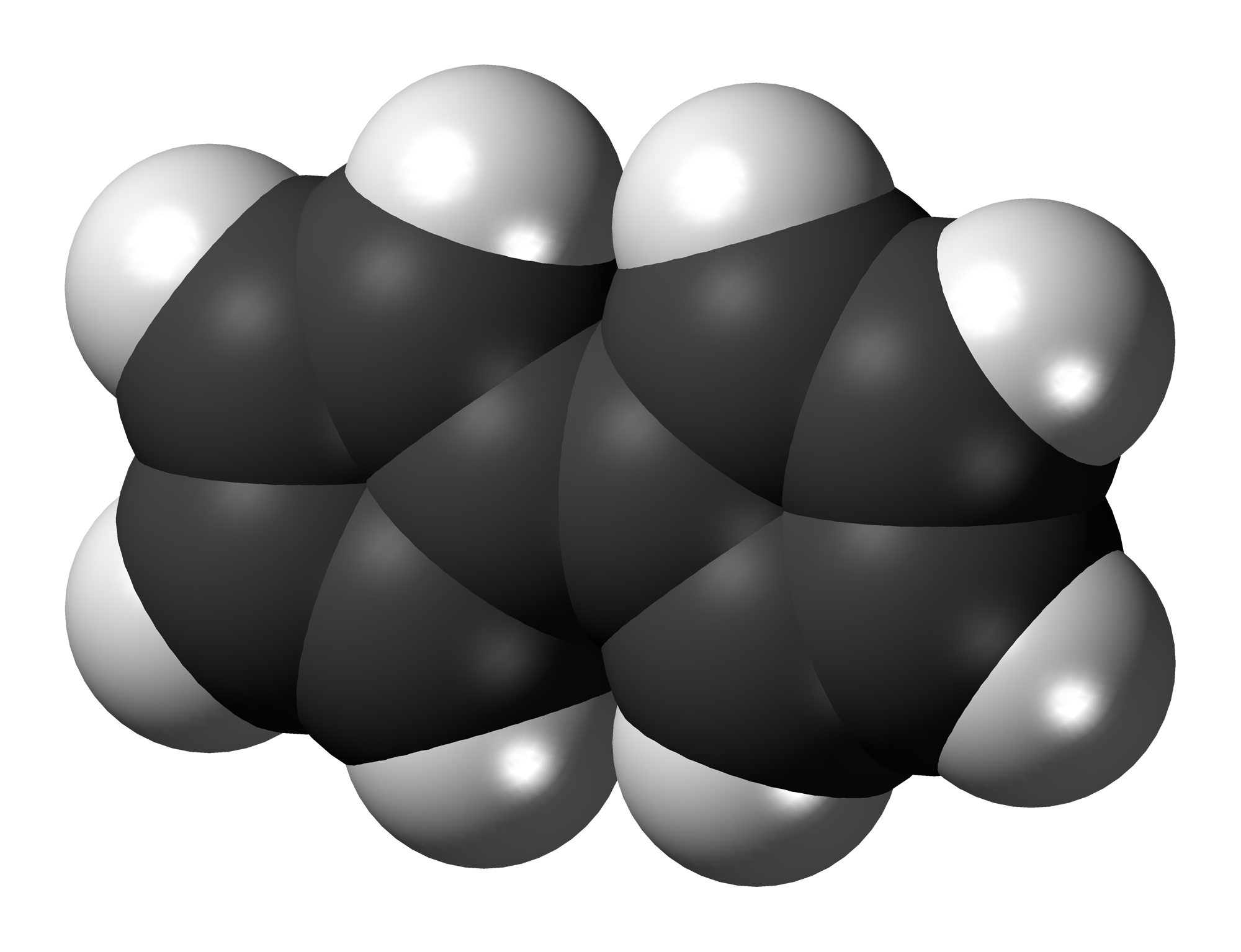

Names
- Preferred IUPAC name [1,1′-Bi(cyclopentylidene)]-2,2′,4,4′-tetraene
- Other names Bicyclopentyliden-2,4,2′,4′-tetraene; 1,1′-Bi[cyclopentadienylidene] Pentafulvalene; Bicyclopentadienylidene [5,5′]Bicyclopentadienylidene

Identifiers
| CAS Number | 91-12-3 |
| 3D model (JSmol) | Interactive image |
| ChEBI | CHEBI:51994 |
| ChemSpider | 9083553 |
| PubChem CID | 10908294 |
| UNII | V2K3QQS6YW |
| CompTox Dashboard (EPA) | DTXSID10447902 |
- InChI: InChI=1S/C10H8/c1-2-6-9(5-1)10-7-3-4-8-10/h1-8H Key: XEOSBIMHSUFHQH-UHFFFAOYSA-N; InChI=1/C10H8/c1-2-6-9(5-1)10-7-3-4-8-10/h1-8H Key: XEOSBIMHSUFHQH-UHFFFAOYAP
- SMILES: C=1\C=C/C(/C=1)=C2\C=C/C=C2

Properties
| Chemical formula | C_{10}H_{8} |
| Molar mass | 128.174 g·mol^{−1} |
| Density | 1.129 g/ml |
- Except where otherwise noted, data are given for materials in their standard state (at 25 °C [77 °F], 100 kPa). verify (what is ?) Infobox references

Fulvalene (bicyclopentadienylidene) is the member of the fulvalene family with the molecular formula C_{10}H_{8}. It is of theoretical interest as one of the simplest non-benzenoid conjugated hydrocarbons. Fulvalene is an unstable isomer of the more common benzenoid aromatic compounds naphthalene and azulene. Fulvalene consists of two 5-membered rings, each with two double bonds, joined by yet a fifth double bond. It has D_{2h} symmetry.

== History ==
Biferrocene and bis(fulvalene)diiron (not shown) are complexes of the fulvalene dianion.

An earlier attempt at synthesis of fulvalene in 1951 by Pauson and Kealy resulted in the accidental discovery of ferrocene. Its synthesis was first reported in 1958 by E. A. Matzner, working under William von Eggers Doering. In this method, the cyclopentadienyl anion is coupled with iodine to the dihydrofulvalene. Double deprotonation of the dihydrofulvalene with n-butyllithium gives the dilithio derivative, which is oxidized by oxygen. Fulvalene was spectroscopically observed at −196 °C (77 K) from photolysis of diazocyclopentadiene, which induces dimerization of cyclopentadiene-derived carbenes. The compound was isolated in 1986 and was found to be nonaromatic. Above −50 °C (223 K) it dimerizes by a Diels–Alder reaction.

== Derivatives ==
Perchlorofulvalene (C_{4}Cl_{4}C)_{2} is quite stable in contrast to fulvalene itself.

== See also ==
- Fulvenes, (CH=CH)_{2}C=CH_{2} and substituted derivatives
- Tetrathiafulvalene, C_{2}H_{2}S_{2}C=CS_{2}C_{2}H_{2}
- Tetramethyltetraselenafulvalene, C_{10}H_{12}Se_{4}
