= Bicalicene =

trans-Bicalicene

Names
- IUPAC names (4aZ,8aZ)-Dicyclopenta[a,e]dicyclopropa[c,g][8]annulene; Dicyclopenta[a,e]dicyclopropa[c,g]cyclooctene

Identifiers
CAS Number	73091-52-8
3D model (JSmol)	Interactive image
ChemSpider	4423214
PubChem CID	5257656
UNII	494N9YP93C
- InChI: InChI=1S/C16H8/c1-3-9-10(4-1)14-8-16(14)12-6-2-5-11(12)15-7-13(9)15/h1-8H/b13-9-,14-10-,15-11-,16-12- Key: FVDGMBFXSFSQOU-NONDJZLBSA-N; InChI=1/C16H8/c1-3-9-10(4-1)14-8-16(14)12-6-2-5-11(12)15-7-13(9)15/h1-8H/b13-9-,14-10-,15-11-,16-12- Key: FVDGMBFXSFSQOU-NONDJZLBBM
- SMILES: C1=CC2=C3C=C3C4=CC=CC4=C5C=C5C2=C1

Properties
Chemical formula	C_{16}H_{8}
Molar mass	200.240 g·mol^{−1}
Melting point	125–130 °C (dec)
- Except where otherwise noted, data are given for materials in their standard state (at 25 °C [77 °F], 100 kPa). Infobox references

cis-Bicalicene

Names
- IUPAC name Dicyclopenta[a,c]dicyclopropa[e,g]cyclooctene

Identifiers
CAS Number	122605-73-6
3D model (JSmol)	Interactive image
PubChem CID	101619525
- InChI: InChI=1S/C16H8/c1-3-9-10-4-2-6-12(10)14-8-16(14)15-7-13(15)11(9)5-1/h1-8H Key: MIGVZWUAYKWALJ-UHFFFAOYSA-N
- SMILES: C1=CC2=C3C=C3C4=CC4=C5C=CC=C5C2=C1

Properties
Chemical formula	C_{16}H_{8}
Molar mass	200.240 g·mol^{−1}
- Except where otherwise noted, data are given for materials in their standard state (at 25 °C [77 °F], 100 kPa). Infobox references

Bicalicene is polycyclic hydrocarbon with chemical formula C_{16}H_{8}, composed of two cyclopentadiene and two cyclopropene rings linked into a larger eight-membered ring. There are two isomers: cis-bicalicene and trans-bicalicene. It is a dimer of calicene.

== Synthesis ==
Bicalicene is prepared by treatment of 1,2-bis(tert-butylthio)-3,3-dichlorocyclopropene with cyclopentadiene anion, followed by desulfurizing stannylation with tributyltin hydride, and then treatment with silica gel.

== Properties ==
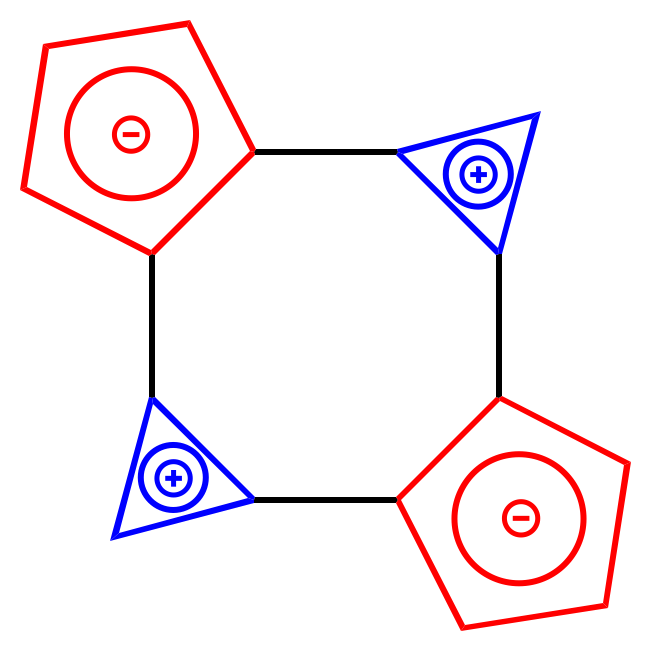
The four aromatic rings of trans-bicalicene

trans-Bicalicene is polycyclic aromatic hydrocarbon, which is unusual for a 16 π electron ring system. Viewed as a unified ring structure, Hückel's rule predicts it would be anti-aromatic (4n π electrons). Instead, however, the structure has a dominant partially-delocalized charge-separated structure consisting of four independently-aromatic (4n+2 π electron) rings: two as cyclopropenyl cations (two π electrons each) and two as cyclopentadienyl anions (six π electrons each).

cis-Bicalicene, by contrast, is an antiaromatic hydrocarbon. A resonance structure with four aromatic rings, analogous to the one that makes the trans isomer stable, would suffer from destabilizing charge effects, and other resonance structures have 4n rather than 4n+2 π electrons in at least one ring.
