= Bis(fulvalene)diiron =

Names
- Other names Biferrocenylene

Identifiers
| CAS Number | 11105-90-1 |
| 3D model (JSmol) | Interactive image |
| ChemSpider | 10157150 |
| PubChem CID | 11984650 |
- InChI: InChI=1S/2C10H8.2Fe/c2*1-2-6-9(5-1)10-7-3-4-8-10;;/h2*1-8H;;/q-6;-2;; Key: RQVWSKGUQRKYKR-UHFFFAOYSA-N
- SMILES: C1=C[C-](C=C1)[C-]2C=CC=C2.[Fe+2].[Fe+2].C1=C[C-](C=C1)[C-]2C=CC=C2

Properties
| Chemical formula | C_{20}H_{16}Fe_{2} |
| Molar mass | 368.038 g·mol^{−1} |
| Appearance | orange solid |
| Density | 1.76 g/cm^{3} |
- Except where otherwise noted, data are given for materials in their standard state (at 25 °C [77 °F], 100 kPa). Infobox references

Bis(fulvalene)diiron is the organoiron complex with the formula (C_{5}H_{4}-C_{5}H_{4})_{2}Fe_{2}. Structurally, the molecule consists of two ferrous centers sandwiched between fulvalene dianions. The compound is an orange solid with lower solubility in benzene than ferrocene. Its structure has been verified by X-ray crystallography. The compound has attracted some interest for its redox properties.

== Preparation ==
It was first prepared by Ullmann coupling of 1,1'-diiodoferrocene using copper but subsequent work produces the complex is 20-40% yield from dilithiofulvalene and ferrous chloride:

2 (C_{5}H_{4}Li)_{2} + 2 FeCl2 → (C_{5}H_{4}-C_{5}H_{4})_{2}Fe_{2} + 4 LiCl

== Related compounds ==
- Biferrocene
