= Heptalene =

Hydrocarbon compound

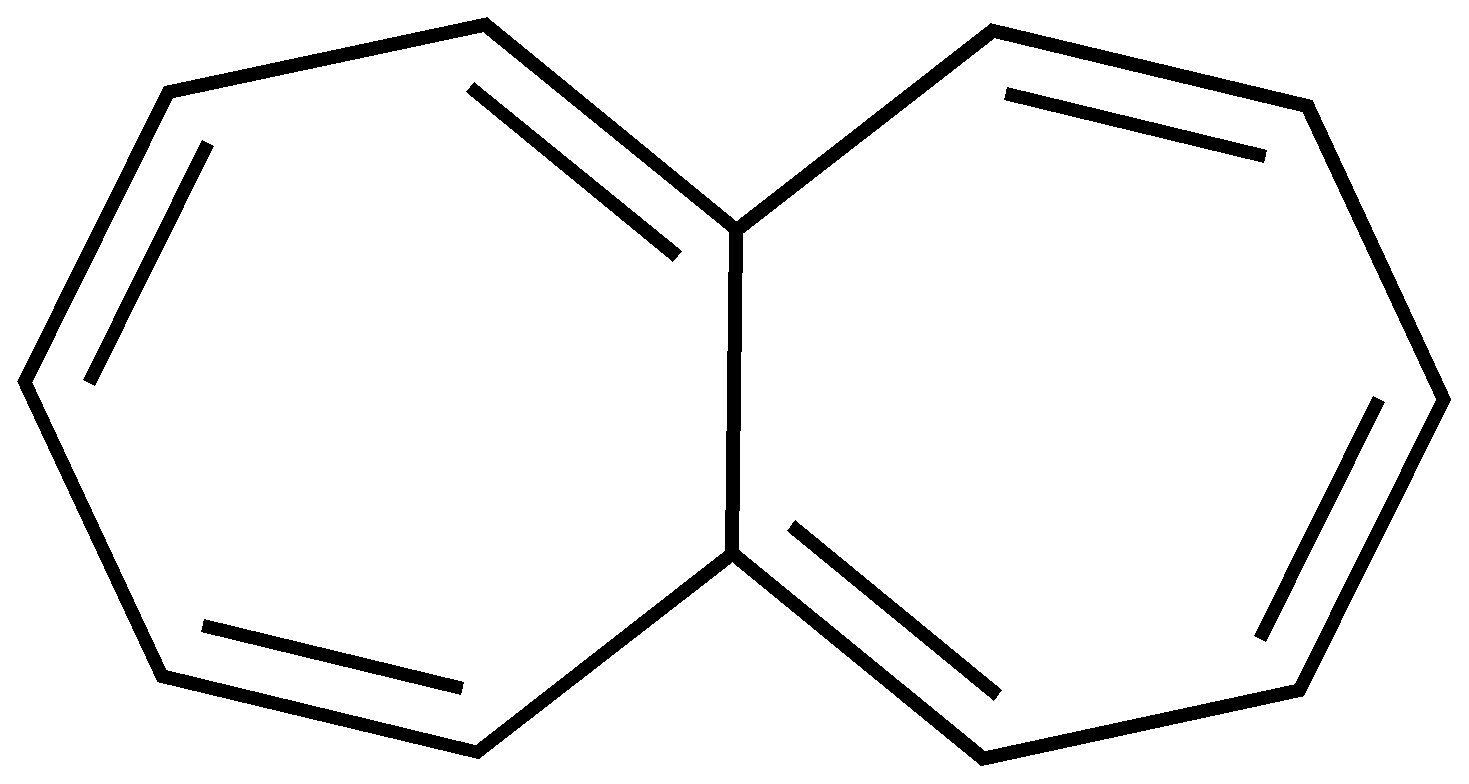
- Skeletal formula

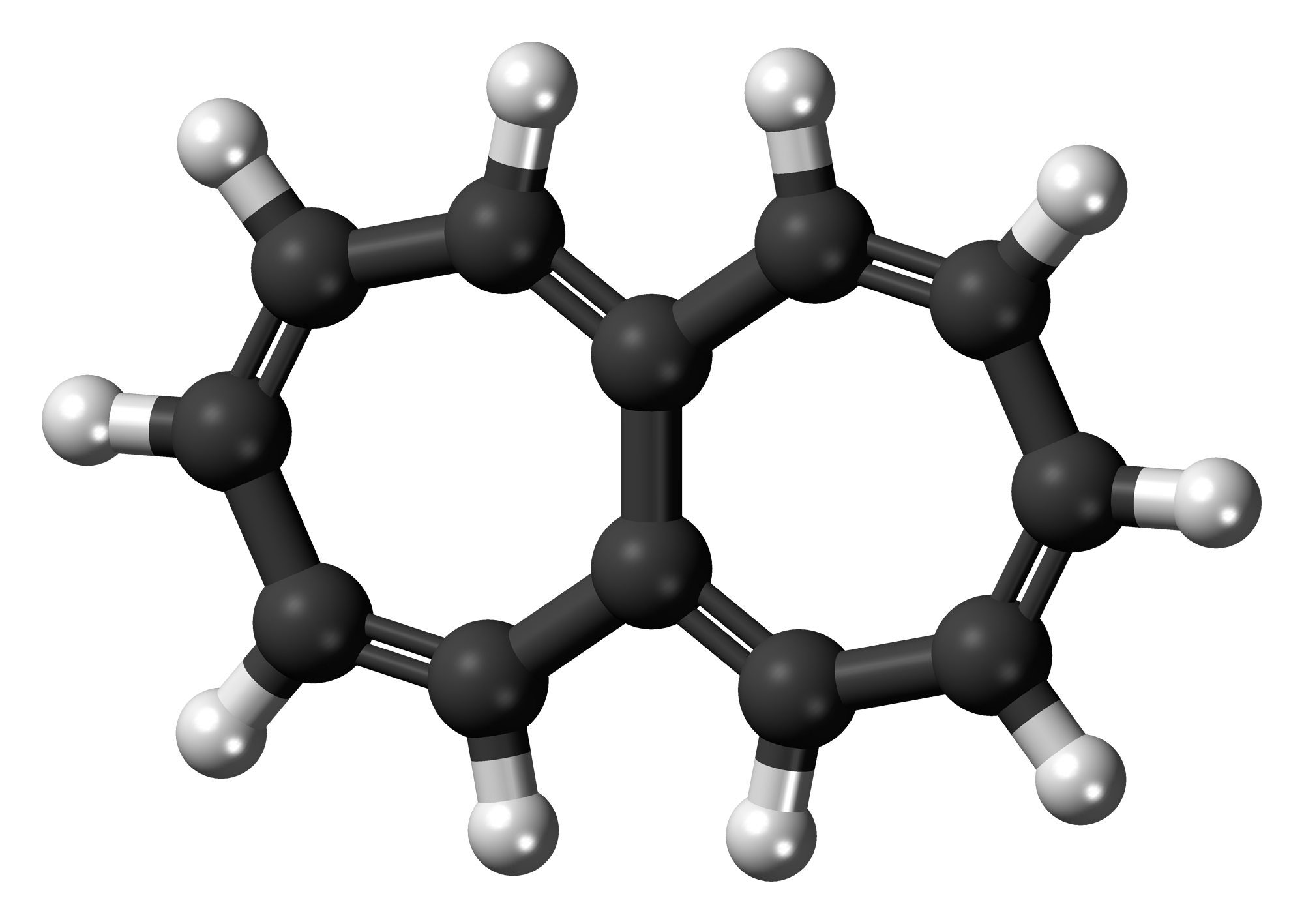
- Ball-and-stick model

Names
- Preferred IUPAC name Heptalene

Identifiers
CAS Number	257-24-9
3D model (JSmol)	Interactive image
ChemSpider	4574193
PubChem CID	5460725
UNII	MJX2GL6N86
CompTox Dashboard (EPA)	DTXSID10420114
- InChI: InChI=1S/C12H10/c1-3-7-11-9-5-2-6-10-12(11)8-4-1/h1-10H Key: DDTGNKBZWQHIEH-UHFFFAOYSA-N; InChI=1/C12H10/c1-3-7-11-9-5-2-6-10-12(11)8-4-1/h1-10H Key: DDTGNKBZWQHIEH-UHFFFAOYAV
- SMILES: C1=CC=C2C=CC=CC=C2C=C1

Properties
Chemical formula	C_{12}H_{10}
Molar mass	154.212 g·mol^{−1}
- Except where otherwise noted, data are given for materials in their standard state (at 25 °C [77 °F], 100 kPa). verify (what is ?) Infobox references

Heptalene is a polycyclic hydrocarbon with chemical formula C_{12}H_{10}, composed of two fused cycloheptatriene rings. It is an unstable, non-planar compound which is non-aromatic. The dianion, however, satisfies Hückel's rule, is thermally stable, and is planar.

== See also ==
- Benzocyclooctatetraene
- Butalene
- Pentalene
- Octalene
- Azulene
