= Sesquifulvalene =

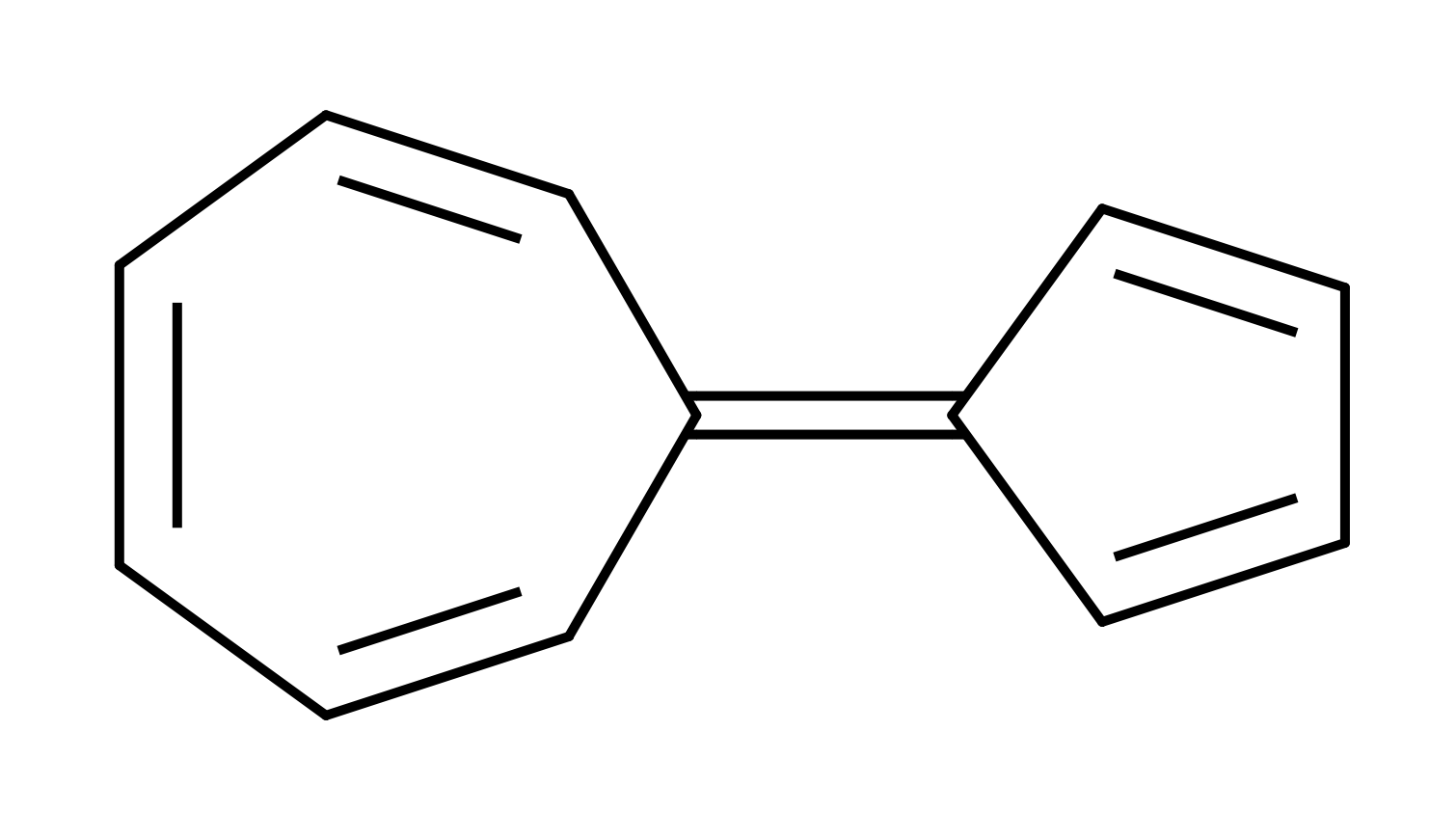

Names
- Preferred IUPAC name 7-(Cyclopenta-2,4-dien-1-ylidene)cyclohepta-1,3,5-triene
- Other names Pentaheptafulvalene

Identifiers
CAS Number	1961-84-8
3D model (JSmol)	Interactive image
ChemSpider	553644
PubChem CID	638082
CompTox Dashboard (EPA)	DTXSID701032988
- InChI: InChI=1S/C12H10/c1-2-4-8-11(7-3-1)12-9-5-6-10-12/h1-10H Key: JYRVSRMFQWYDGM-UHFFFAOYSA-N
- SMILES: C1=CC=CC(=C2C=CC=C2)C=C1

Properties
Chemical formula	C_{12}H_{10}
Molar mass	154.212 g·mol^{−1}
- Except where otherwise noted, data are given for materials in their standard state (at 25 °C [77 °F], 100 kPa). Infobox references

Sesquifulvalene or pentaheptafulvalene is a hydrocarbon in the fulvalene class with chemical formula C_{12}H_{10}. It is composed of linked cyclopentadiene and cycloheptatriene rings.

== Properties ==
In the ground state, which is a singlet state, the central double bond is polarized, with a partial positive charge on the carbon atom of heptagonal ring and a partial negative charge on the carbon atom of pentagonal ring. This shift makes each ring have closer to 4n+2 π electrons, in keeping with the Hückel's pattern of aromatic stability. However, in the lowest quintet state, the central double bond is polarized with a partial negative charge on the carbon atom of heptagonal ring and a partial positive charge on the carbon atom of pentagonal ring due to Baird's rule.

== See also ==
- Tropone
- Biphenyl
- Calicene
- Azulene
