= Thianthrene =

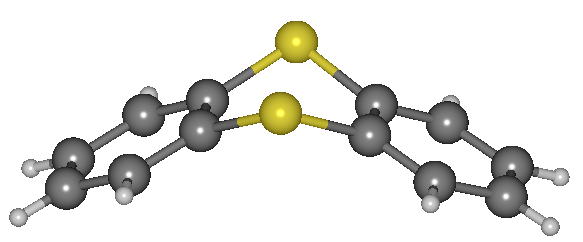

Names
- Preferred IUPAC name Thianthrene
- Other names Thianthren; 9,10-Dithiaanthracene; Di-o-phenylene disulfide

Identifiers
CAS Number	92-85-3
3D model (JSmol)	Interactive image
ChEMBL	ChEMBL488176
ChemSpider	6842
ECHA InfoCard	100.001.998
EC Number	202-197-0
PubChem CID	7109
UNII	4139V9M46H
CompTox Dashboard (EPA)	DTXSID6059071
- InChI: InChI=1S/C12H8S2/c1-2-6-10-9(5-1)13-11-7-3-4-8-12(11)14-10/h1-8H Key: GVIJJXMXTUZIOD-UHFFFAOYSA-N
- SMILES: S1c3c(Sc2c1cccc2)cccc3

Properties
Chemical formula	C_{12}H_{8}S_{2}
Molar mass	216.32 g·mol^{−1}
Melting point	151 to 155 °C (304 to 311 °F; 424 to 428 K)
Boiling point	364 to 366 °C (687 to 691 °F; 637 to 639 K)

Related compounds
Related compounds	Selenanthrene; Mesulfen
- Except where otherwise noted, data are given for materials in their standard state (at 25 °C [77 °F], 100 kPa). verify (what is ?) Infobox references

Thianthrene is a sulfur-containing heterocyclic chemical compound in which two benzene rings are connected by a 1,4-dithiin ring. It is notable for its ease of oxidation.

== Structure ==
Like other 1,4-dithiins but unlike its oxygen analog dibenzodioxin, the shape of thianthrene is not planar. It is bent, with a fold angle of 128° between the two benzo groups. The central six-atom ring adopts a boat conformation, as also found in thianthrene's parent heterocycle 1,4-dithiin and its selenium analog selenanthrene.

== Synthesis ==
Thianthrene was first synthesized by John Stenhouse by dry distillation of sodium benzenesulfonate. Thianthrene can be prepared by treating benzene with disulfur dichloride in the presence of aluminium chloride.

== Reactions ==
Thianthrene has an extensive redox chemistry. It is oxidized by sulfuric acid to a red radical cation. In water-free environments, the metastable thianthrenediium dication may also be observed.

Thianthrene^{•+} (5-thianthrenyl-5-ylium) has been characterized by electron paramagnetic resonance. Four different publications describe the crystal structure of thianthrene radical cation salts. The cation is nearly planar, depending on the particular salt. In addition to flattening the heterocycle, removal of an electron causes the C−S distances to contract by 3%. These salts have use as one-electron oxidants. The tetrafluoroborate salt is obtained by reacting thianthrene with nitrosonium tetrafluoroborate. It is safer than the perchlorate, a shock-sensitive explosive.

The radical cation reacts with water to give equimolar quantities of thianthrene and its S-oxide, which is hence the product of aqueous oxidation with reagents such as ferric nitrate. The S-oxide is a precursor to aryl thianthrenium salts, which are versatile synthetic intermediates.

The oxidation of thianthrene S-oxide has been used to measure the electrophilicity of oxygen-transfer reagents; electrophilic oxidation yields more cis- and trans- disulfoxides, whereas nucleophilic oxidation yields more of the sulfone. Oxides all the way up to the tetroxide are known.

Thianthrene also can function as a Lewis base.
