= Pentalene =

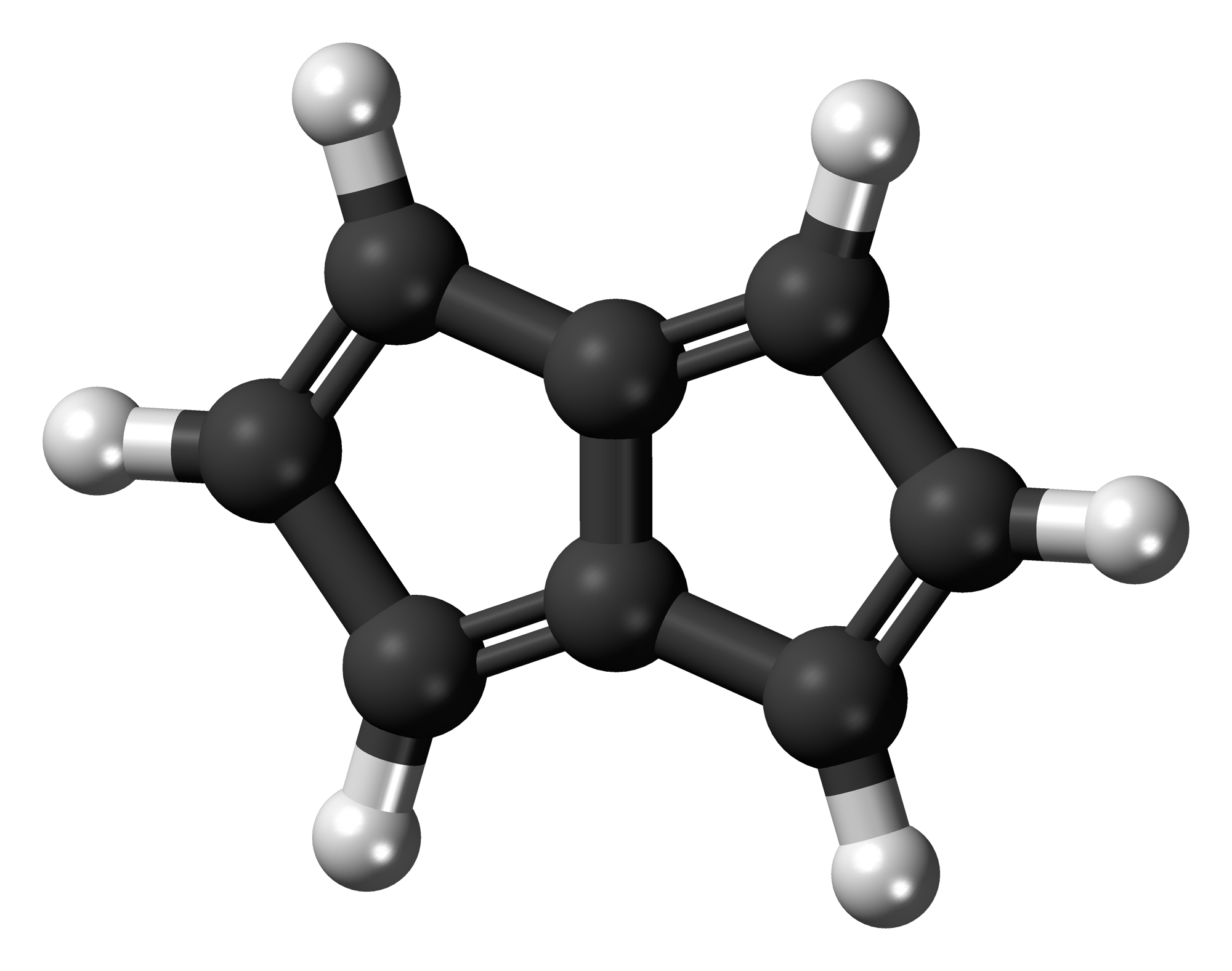

Names
- Preferred IUPAC name Pentalene
- Other names Bicyclooctatetraene

Identifiers
CAS Number	250-25-9
3D model (JSmol)	Interactive image
ChEBI	CHEBI:33074
ChemSpider	4574194
PubChem CID	5460726
UNII	E5A3KT7S2A
CompTox Dashboard (EPA)	DTXSID70420115
- InChI: InChI=1/C8H6/c1-3-7-5-2-6-8(7)4-1/h1-6H
- SMILES: C1=CC2=CC=CC2=C1

Properties
Chemical formula	C_{8}H_{6}
Molar mass	102.136 g·mol^{−1}
- Except where otherwise noted, data are given for materials in their standard state (at 25 °C [77 °F], 100 kPa). verify (what is ?) Infobox references

Pentalene is a polycyclic hydrocarbon composed of two fused cyclopentadiene rings. It has chemical formula C_{8}H_{6}. It is antiaromatic, because it has 4n π electrons where n is any integer. For this reason it dimerizes even at temperatures as low as −100 °C. The derivative 1,3,5-tri-tert-butylpentalene was synthesized in 1973. Because of the tert-butyl substituents this compound is thermally stable. Pentalenes can also be stabilized by benzannulation for example in the compounds benzopentalene and dibenzopentalene.

Dilithium pentalenide was isolated in 1962, long before pentalene itself in 1997. It is prepared from reaction of dihydropentalene (pyrolysis of dicyclopentadiene or cyclooctatetraene) with n-butyllithium in solution and forms a stable salt. In accordance with its structure proton NMR shows 2 signals in a 2 to 1 ratio. The addition of two electrons removes the antiaromaticity; it becomes a planar 10π-electron aromatic species and is thus a bicyclic analogue of the cyclooctatetraene (COT) dianion C_{8}H^{2−}_{8}.

The dianion can also be considered as two fused cyclopentadienyl rings, and has been used as a ligand in organometallic chemistry to stabilise many types of mono- and bimetallic complexes, including those containing multiple metal-metal bonds, and anti-bimetallics with extremely high levels of electronic communication between the centers.

== See also ==
- Cyclooctatetraene
- Benzocyclobutadiene
- Acepentalene
- Butalene
- Heptalene
- Octalene
