= Fulvenes =

Class of chemical compounds

Chemical structure of fulvene

Fulvenes are the class of hydrocarbon obtained by formally cross-conjugating one ring and methylidene through a common exocyclic double bond.

In addition to compounds with substituent group on the fulvene skeleton, structural analogs in this class include heteroatom replacements and variations of ring-size. Thus, methylenecyclopropene can be called triafulvene and cyclopropenone is an oxafulvene. Analogs in which certain ring carbons are replaced by other elements, sometimes entailing changes of the double-bonding pattern of the heterocyclic core as in dithiafulvene, lead to changes in the electronic properties of the ring.

== Preparation ==
Fulvenes are readily prepared by the condensation of cyclopentadiene with various aldehydes and ketones under strongly basic conditions, via a cyclopentadienyl anion intermediate:

C_{5}H_{6} + R_{2}C=O → C_{4}H_{4}C=CR_{2} + H_{2}O

Johannes Thiele is credited with discovering this reaction.

Modern synthesis of fulvenes employ buffer systems or other mild conditions.

== Properties ==
The cross-conjugation generally destabilizes the exocyclic double bond, as (per Hückel's rules) polarization of the π electrons would lead to an aromatic ring ion. Consequently, fulvenes add nucleo- and electrophiles easily. They also have a small HOMO–LUMO gap, typically leading to the eponymous visible coloration ("fulvus" is Latin for "yellow").

== Ligand in organometallic chemistry ==
Fulvenes are common ligands and ligand precursors in organometallic chemistry. 2,3,4,5-Tetramethylfulvene, abbreviated Me_{4}Fv, results from the deprotonation of cationic pentamethylcyclopentadienyl complexes. Some Me_{4}Fv complexes are called tuck-in complexes.

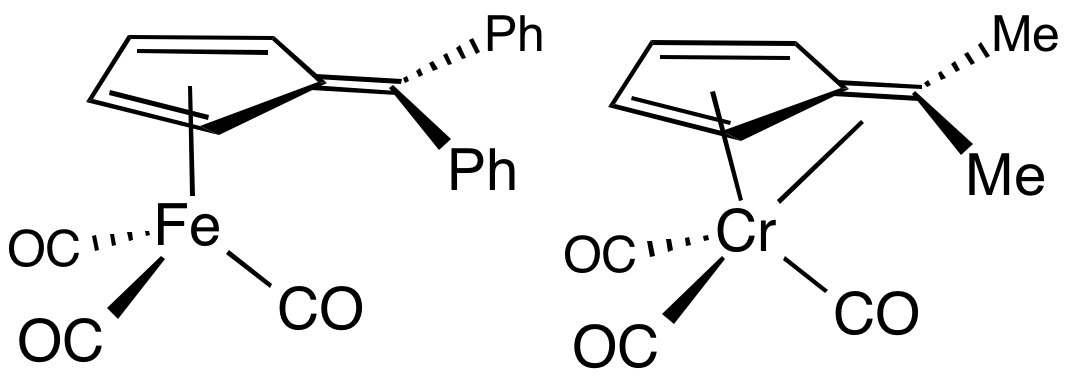
η^{4}- and (η^{2},η^{4})-fulvene complexes
