= Methylenecyclopropene =

Names
- Preferred IUPAC name 3-Methylidenecycloprop-1-ene
- Other names 3-Methylenecyclopropene; Triafulvene

Identifiers
CAS Number	4095-06-1
3D model (JSmol)	Interactive image
ChemSpider	121753
PubChem CID	138112
UNII	CA6K4MSR8T
CompTox Dashboard (EPA)	DTXSID40193945
- InChI: InChI=1S/C4H4/c1-4-2-3-4/h2-3H,1H2 Key: GOSMMPKSWSOPRZ-UHFFFAOYSA-N; InChI=1/C4H4/c1-4-2-3-4/h2-3H,1H2 Key: GOSMMPKSWSOPRZ-UHFFFAOYAD
- SMILES: C=C1C=C1

Properties
Chemical formula	C_{4}H_{4}
Molar mass	52.076 g·mol^{−1}
- Except where otherwise noted, data are given for materials in their standard state (at 25 °C [77 °F], 100 kPa). verify (what is ?) Infobox references

3-Methylenecyclopropene, also called methylenecyclopropene or triafulvene, is a hydrocarbon with chemical formula C_{4}H_{4}. It is a colourless gas that polymerizes readily as a liquid or in solution but is stable as a gas. This highly strained and reactive molecule was synthesized and characterized for the first time in 1984, and has been the subject of considerable experimental and theoretical interest. It is an example of a cross-conjugated alkene, being composed of cyclopropene with an exocyclic double bond attached.

== Description ==
Methylenecyclopropene is the smallest of the fulvenes (a family of unstable, cyclic molecules, conjugated transversally with an odd number of carbon atoms in the ring).

The structure of methylenecyclopropene has two interacting double bonds, which represents the simplest transversally conjugated π-bonding system. It is fundamentally not an alternant hydrocarbon. The value of its dipole moment (which is around four times that of pentafulvene) can be calculated by the Hückel method (HMO).

Its study has involved the use of isotopic isomers.

== Reactivity ==
Most fulvenes are typically non-aromatic in nature (based on spectroscopic data), having properties closer to alkenes. In the case of tria- and pentafulvene, the possibility of dipole forms of resonance suggests an aromatic character to the cyclic structure; furthermore, as opposed to pentafulvene, one of the triafulvene resonance structures has a negative charge on the methylidene carbon.

Similarly to heptafulvene (fulvene containing a 7-atom cyclic ring), triafulvene polymerizes easily at −20 °C and is stabilized by electron-accepting groups bonded to the methylidene carbon atom.

== See also ==
- Methylenecyclopropane
- Cyclopropene
- Cyclopropane
- Fulvene
- Cyclopropenone
- Methylene group
