= C5H5NO2 =

The molecular formula C_{5}H_{5}NO_{2} (molar mass: 111.10 g/mol) may refer to:

- 2,6-Dihydroxypyridine
- Methyl cyanoacrylate (MCA)
- N-Methylmaleimide
