= Radialene =

Class of chemical compounds

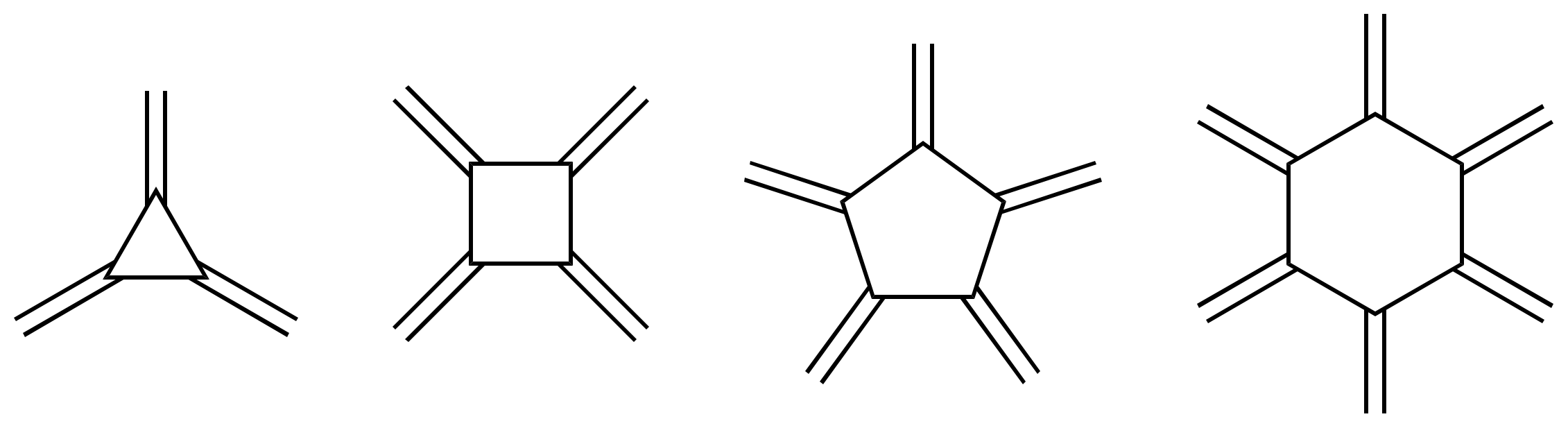
the first four radialenes

[n]Radialenes are alicyclic organic compounds containing n cross-conjugated exocyclic double bonds. The double bonds are commonly alkene groups but those with a carbonyl (C=O) group are also called radialenes. For some members the unsubstituted parent radialenes are elusive but many substituted derivatives are known.

Radialenes are related to open-chain dendralenes and also to compounds like butadiene and benzene which also consist of a ring of sp^{2} hybridized carbon atoms.

Radialenes are investigated in organic chemistry for their unusual properties and reactivity but have not ventured outside the laboratory. Reported uses are as experimental building blocks for novel organic conductors and ferromagnets. The first radialene called hexaethylidencyclohexane was synthesised in 1961.

== Conformation ==
[3] and [4]radialenes are expected to have a planar molecular geometry with all carbon atoms in the same plane. This is verified experimentally in hexamethyl[3]radialene and cyclobutanetetraonetetrakis(hydrazone). Decamethyl[5]radialene has a twist envelope geometry with C_{2} symmetry while a chair conformation is calculated for [6]radialene and found experimentally for hexa-(ethylidene)cyclohexane

Due to their specific pi-electron distributions, hydrocarbons such as perylene and triphenylene are not considered radialenes. One study describes a [6]radialene composed of thiophene units:

This compound is reported as planar with D_{3h} symmetry (X-ray diffraction) but not aromatic: the carbon-carbon bond lengths are unusually long (145 pm vs. 140 pm for benzene) and the calculated NICS value is close to zero.

An analogous [8]radialene which adopts a saddle conformation with D_{2d} symmetry is an intermediate in the synthesis of sulflower (C_{8}S_{8}):

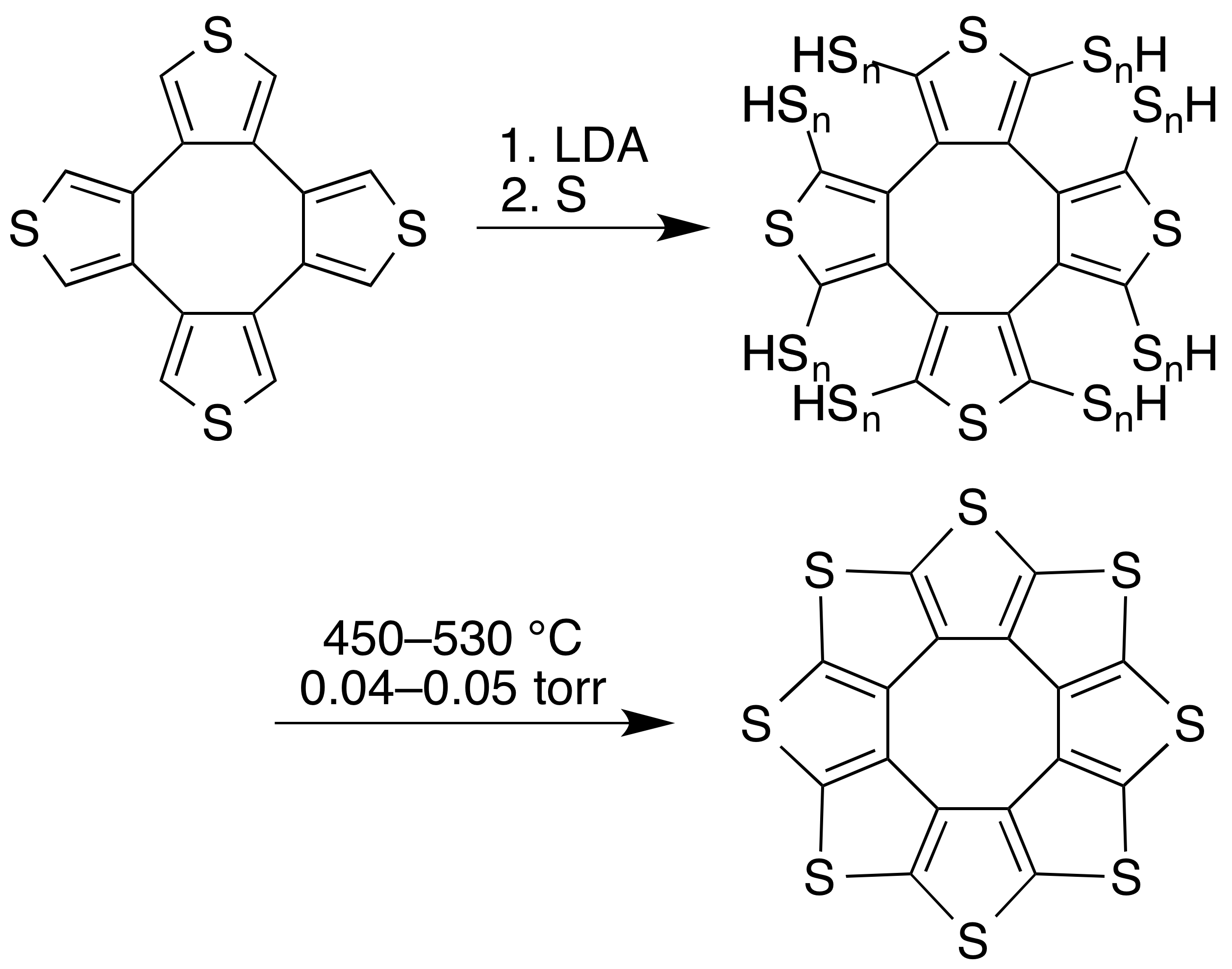

== Synthesis and properties ==
The parent [3], [4], [5] and [6]radialenes polymerize when in contact with oxygen.

=== [3]Radialenes ===
[3]Radialene or trimethylenecyclopropane was synthesised in 1965. Reported derivatives are triquinocyclopropanes, salts of trimethylenecyclopropane dianions, tris(thioxanthen-9-ylidene)cyclopropane, tris(fluoren-9-ylidene)cyclopropane and hexakis(trimethylsilylethynyl)[3]radialene. Phosphorus derivatives (based on 4,5,6-triphospha[3]radialene) have also been reported. Phospharadialenes have been investigated as quantum efficiency improvers in solar cells Hexakis[4-(diarylamino)phenyl][3]radialene derivatives have been investigated for their low oxidation potentials.

=== [4]Radialenes ===
The unsubstituted [4]radialene has been prepared in an elimination reaction of cis,trans,cis-tetra(bromomethyl)cyclobutane with sodium methoxide in ethanol.

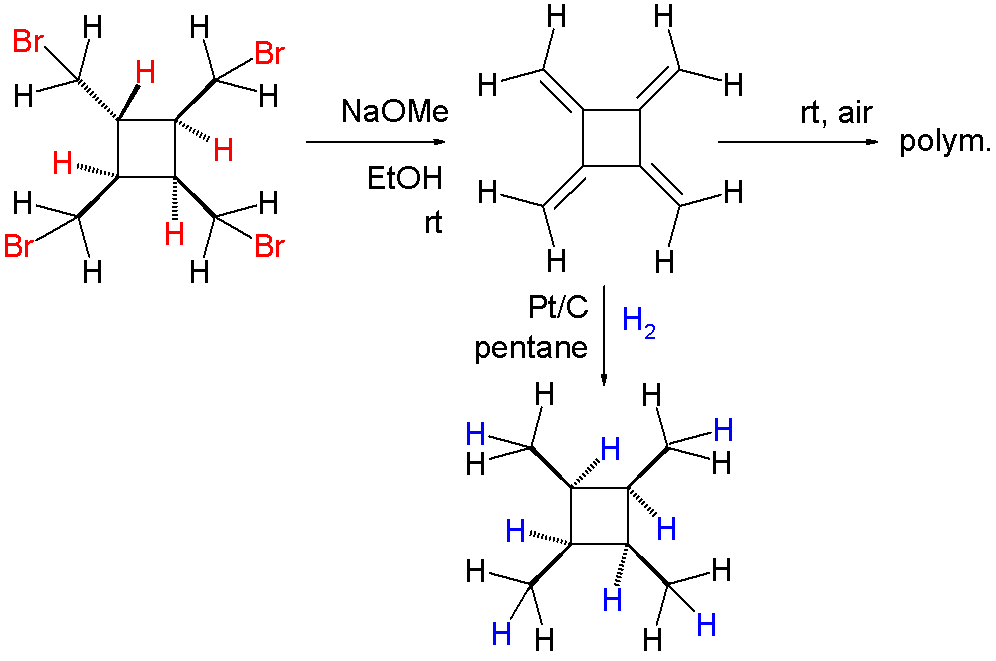
[4]radialene synthesis

Hydrogenation with platinum on carbon gives cis,cis,cis-tetramethylcyclobutane in accordance with the proposed structure.

=== [5]Radialenes ===
Successful low-temperature synthesis of the parent compound [5]radialene was reported in 2015.

=== [6]Radialenes ===
The parent [6]radialene is unstable and polymerises immediately on formation. It has been synthesised from 1,5,9-cyclododecatriyne, 1,3,6-tri(chloromethyl)mesitylene and tricyclobutabenzene.

Only substituted [6]radialenes exist as stable compounds. Stable derivatives are the hexamethyl substituted, dodecamethyl substituted and hexabromo substituted radialene.

A trisalkoxy-substituted radialene has also been reported, the central ring adopting a non-planar twist-boat conformation:

== Uses ==
Radialenes have been researched as a potential way to access complex synthetic molecules and in polymer synthesis.
