= 2,6-dihydroxypseudooxynicotine hydrolase =

Class of enzymes

Identifiers
- EC no.: 3.7.1.19

Databases
- BRENDA: enzyme data
- ExPASy: NiceZyme view
- KEGG: enzyme entry
- MetaCyc: metabolic pathway
- Rhea: reactions
- PDB structures: RCSB PDB PDBe PDBsum
Search
- PMC: articles
- PubMed: articles
- NCBI: proteins

2,6-dihydroxypseudooxynicotine hydrolase (EC 3.7.1.19) is an enzyme characterised from Arthrobacter species with systematic name 1-(2,6-dihydroxypyridin-3-yl)-4-(methylamino)butan-1-one hydrolase. It catalyses the hydrolysis of 2,6-dihydroxypseudooxynicotine to ,6-dihydroxypyridine and 4-(methylamino)butyric acid, a reaction that is part of the catabolism of nicotine:

2,6-dihydroxypseudooxynicotine
H_{2}O
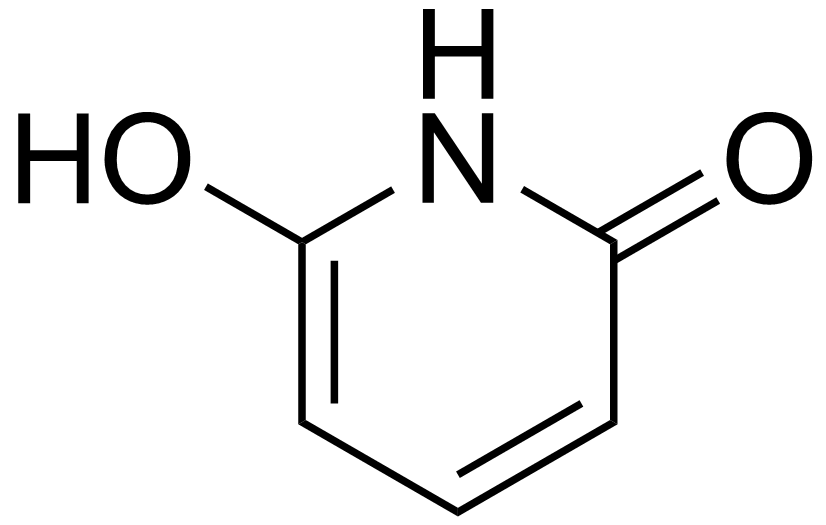
2,6-dihydroxypyridine
+
4-(methylamino)butyric acid

The enzyme has been suggested as part of a bioremediation process for nicotine removal near tobacco factories.
