= Dendralene =

Class of chemical compounds

A dendralene is a discrete acyclic cross-conjugated polyene. The simplest dendralene is buta-1,3-diene (1) or [2]dendralene followed by [3]dendralene (2), [4]dendralene (3) and [5]dendralene (4) and so forth. [2]dendralene (butadiene) is the only one not cross-conjugated.

The name dendralene is pulled together from the words dendrimer, linear and alkene. The higher dendralenes are of scientific interest because they open up a large array of new organic compounds from a relatively simple precursor especially by Diels-Alder chemistry. Their cyclic counterparts are aptly called radialenes.

== Synthesis ==
Vinylbutadiene ([3]dendralene) was first prepared in 1955 by pyrolysis of a triacetate:

This compound reacts with two equivalents of maleic anhydride in a tandem DA reaction:

With benzoquinone the reaction product was a linear polymer.

Several syntheses of substituted [3]dendralenes have been reported, one via an allene, one via a Horner–Wadsworth–Emmons reaction, one via a cross-coupling reaction and one from an allylic carbonate.

One synthetic route to [4]dendralene starts from chloroprene. This compound is converted to a Grignard reagent by action of magnesium metal which is then reacted with copper(I) chloride to an organocopper intermediate which is in turn dimerized using copper(II) chloride in an oxidative coupling reaction to give the butadiene dimer called [4]dendralene.

The gas-phase molecular structure of [4]dendralene has been reported

The [8]-dendralene compound was reported in 2009:

in a successive Kumada–Tamao–Corriu coupling and Negishi coupling.

A series of [9] to [12]-dendralenes has been reported in 2016

== Properties ==
Even-membered dendralenes (e.g. [6]dendralene, [8]dendralene) tend to behave as chains of decoupled and isolated diene units. The ultraviolet absorption maxima equal that of butadiene itself. The dendralenes with an odd number of alkene units are more reactive due to the presence of favorable s-cis diene conformations and Diels-Alder reactions take place more easily with a preference for the termini.

== Reactions ==
With simple dienophiles, dendralenes can give quick access to complex molecules in Diels-Alder reactions. Several reaction schemes have been reported

[4]dendralene shows a tandem Diels-Alder reaction with the dienophile N-methyl-maleimide (NMM). Complete site selectivity is possible with the addition of the Lewis acid methyldichloroaluminium. With one set of premixing and 2 equivalents of NMM, the central diene group is targeted to the monoadduct 3. With another set and a larger amount of dienophile, the terminal groups react and the reaction proceeds from the monoadduct to the trisadducts 2 and 2b.

One reaction variation is cyclopropanation to a compound class called ivyanes with a reported synthesis in a Simmons–Smith reaction (diethyl zinc / trifluoroacetic acid) of the first 6 members. These 1,1-oligocyclopropanes are stable (except when exposed to acids) and have a large heat of combustion with [6]ivyane exceeding that of cubane. The oligocyclopropane chains adopt a helical conformation. For [3]dendralene a photochemical cyclisation reaction has been reported

== Derivatives ==
A bicyclic [4]dendralene compound has been reported.
