= 2,6-dihydroxypyridine 3-monooxygenase =

Class of enzymes

Identifiers
- EC no.: 1.14.13.10
- CAS no.: 39279-38-4

Databases
- BRENDA: enzyme data
- ExPASy: NiceZyme view
- KEGG: enzyme entry
- MetaCyc: metabolic pathway
- Rhea: reactions
- PDB structures: RCSB PDB PDBe PDBsum
- Gene Ontology: AmiGO / QuickGO
Search
- PMC: articles
- PubMed: articles
- NCBI: proteins

2,6-dihydroxypyridine 3-monooxygenase (EC 1.14.13.10) is an enzyme that catalyzes the chemical reaction

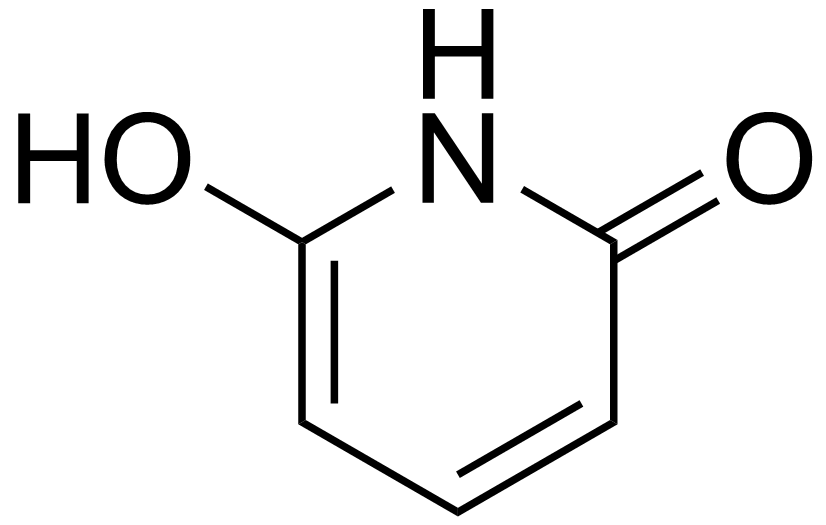
2,6-Dihydroxypyridine
+ NADH
O_{2} + H^{+}
H_{2}O
2,3,6-Trihydroxypyridine
+ NAD^{+}

The four substrates of this enzyme are 2,6-dihydroxypyridine, reduced nicotinamide adenine dinucleotide (NADH), oxygen, and a proton. Its products are 2,3,6-trihydroxypyridine, oxidised NAD^{+}, and water.

The enzyme is a flavin-containing monooxygenase that uses molecular oxygen as oxidant and incorporates one of its atoms into the starting material. The systematic name of this enzyme class is 2,6-dihydroxypyridine,NADH:oxygen oxidoreductase (3-hydroxylating). This enzyme is also called 2,6-dihydroxypyridine oxidase. It uses flavin adenine dinucleotide as a cofactor.
