= NMM =

NMM may refer to:

- FAA Location identifier for Naval Air Station Meridian
- Prefix for Italian ships in the Marina Militare

== Organisations ==
- National Minority Movement, a British organisation which attempted to organise a united front with the existing trade unions
- Navi Mumbai Metro, India
- Nikhil Manipuri Mahasabha, a Hindu nationalist political party

=== Museums ===
- National Music Museum, a musical instrument museum in Vermillion, South Dakota
- National Maritime Museum in Greenwich, England
- National Media Museum in Bradford, England

== Science and technology ==
- Nonhydrostatic Mesoscale Model, used by the WRF
- Network-Integrated Multimedia Middleware, a multimedia framework

=== Chemicals ===
- N-Methylmorpholine, an organic base in chemistry
- N-methyl mesoporphyrin IX, a hemin-related porphyrin
- N-Methylmaleimide, an organic compound
