= Ester pyrolysis =

Vacuum pyrolysis reaction

Ester pyrolysis in organic chemistry is a vacuum pyrolysis reaction converting esters containing a β-hydrogen atom into the corresponding carboxylic acid and the alkene. The reaction is an E_{i} elimination and operates in a syn fashion.

Examples include the synthesis of acrylic acid from ethyl acrylate at 590 °C, the synthesis of 1,4-pentadiene from 1,5-pentanediol diacetate at 575 °C or the construction of a cyclobutene framework at 700 °C

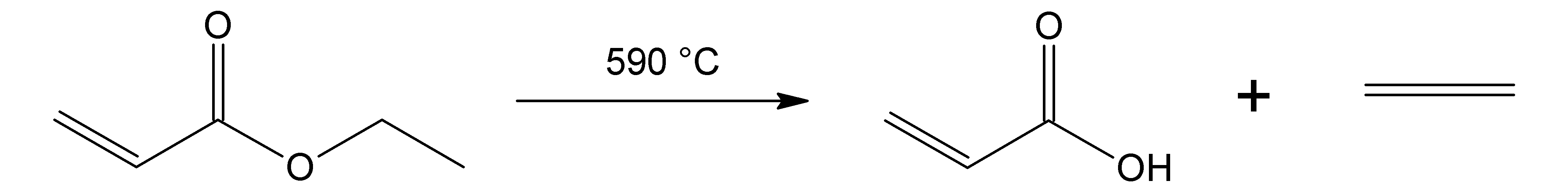
