= Fulvene =

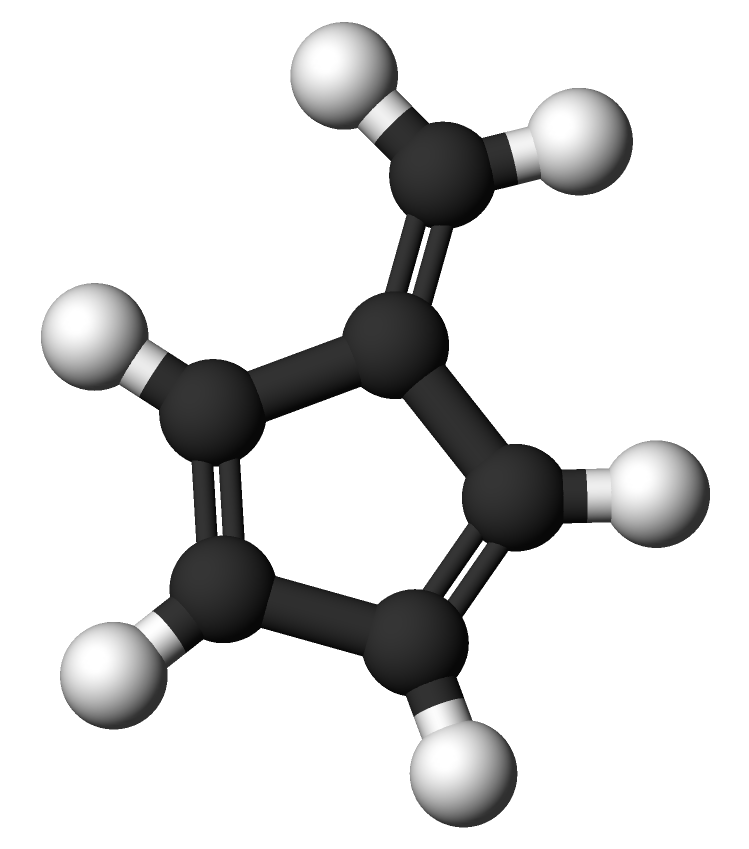

Names
- Preferred IUPAC name 5-Methylidenecyclopenta-1,3-diene
- Other names Fulvene; 5-Methylene-1,3-cyclopentadiene

Identifiers
CAS Number	497-20-1
3D model (JSmol)	Interactive image
ChEBI	CHEBI:51999
ChemSpider	120097
PubChem CID	136323
UNII	19W699IKIE
CompTox Dashboard (EPA)	DTXSID30897602
- InChI: InChI=1S/C6H6/c1-6-4-2-3-5-6/h2-5H,1H2 Key: PGTKVMVZBBZCKQ-UHFFFAOYSA-N; InChI=1/C6H6/c1-6-4-2-3-5-6/h2-5H,1H2 Key: PGTKVMVZBBZCKQ-UHFFFAOYAV
- SMILES: C=C1\C=C/C=C1

Properties
Chemical formula	C_{6}H_{6}
Molar mass	78.114 g·mol^{−1}
Magnetic susceptibility (χ)	−42.9·10^{−6} cm^{3}/mol
- Except where otherwise noted, data are given for materials in their standard state (at 25 °C [77 °F], 100 kPa). verify (what is ?) Infobox references

Fulvene (pentafulvene) is a hydrocarbon with the formula (CH=CH)_{2}C=CH_{2}. It is a prototype of a cross-conjugated hydrocarbon. Fulvene is rarely encountered, but substituted derivatives (fulvenes) are numerous. They are mainly of interest as ligands and precursors to ligands in organometallic chemistry.

Fulvene is an isomer of benzene, which when irradiated at 237 to 254 nm forms small amounts of fulvene along with benzvalene.

== See also ==
- Fulvalene
- Methylenecyclopropene
