= Hexaoxotricyclobutabenzene =

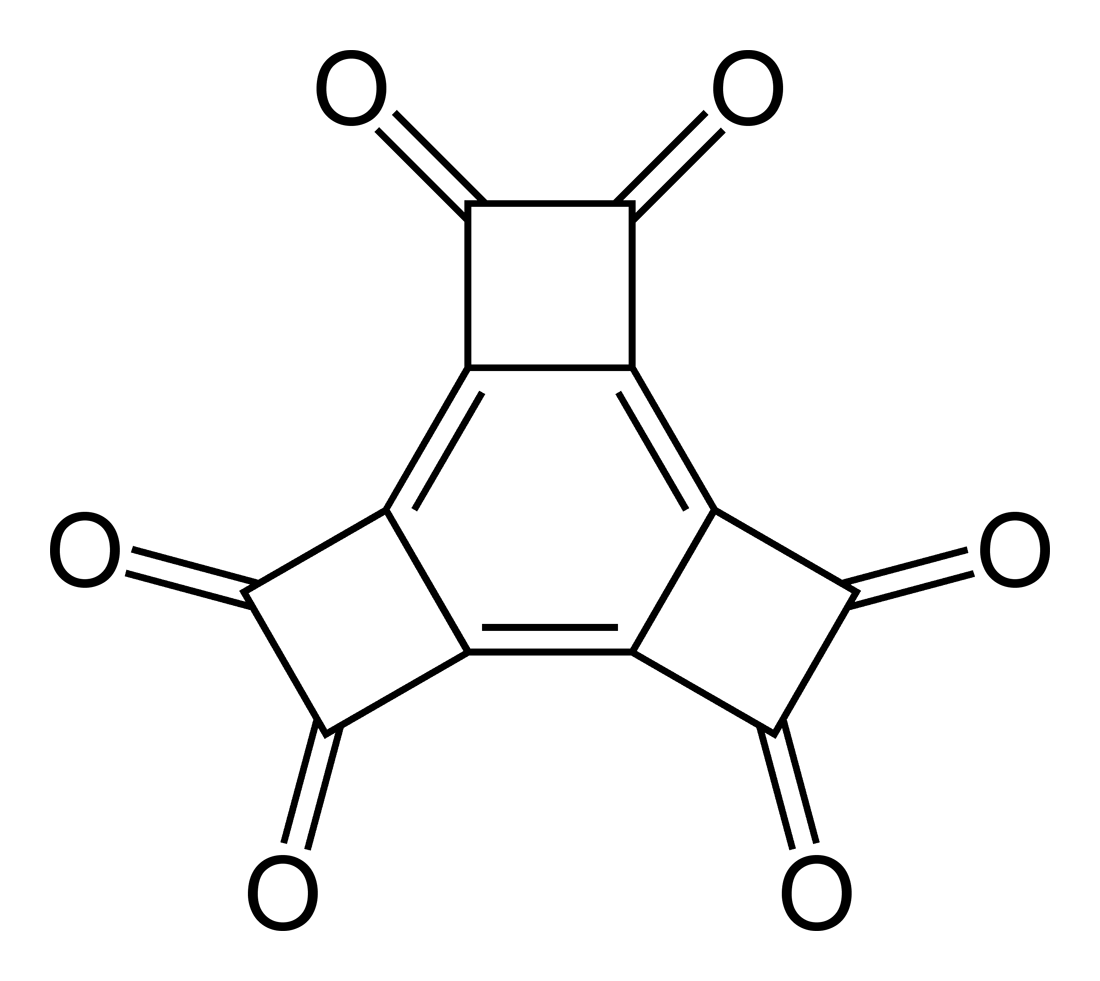
Structural formula of hexaoxotricyclobutabenzene
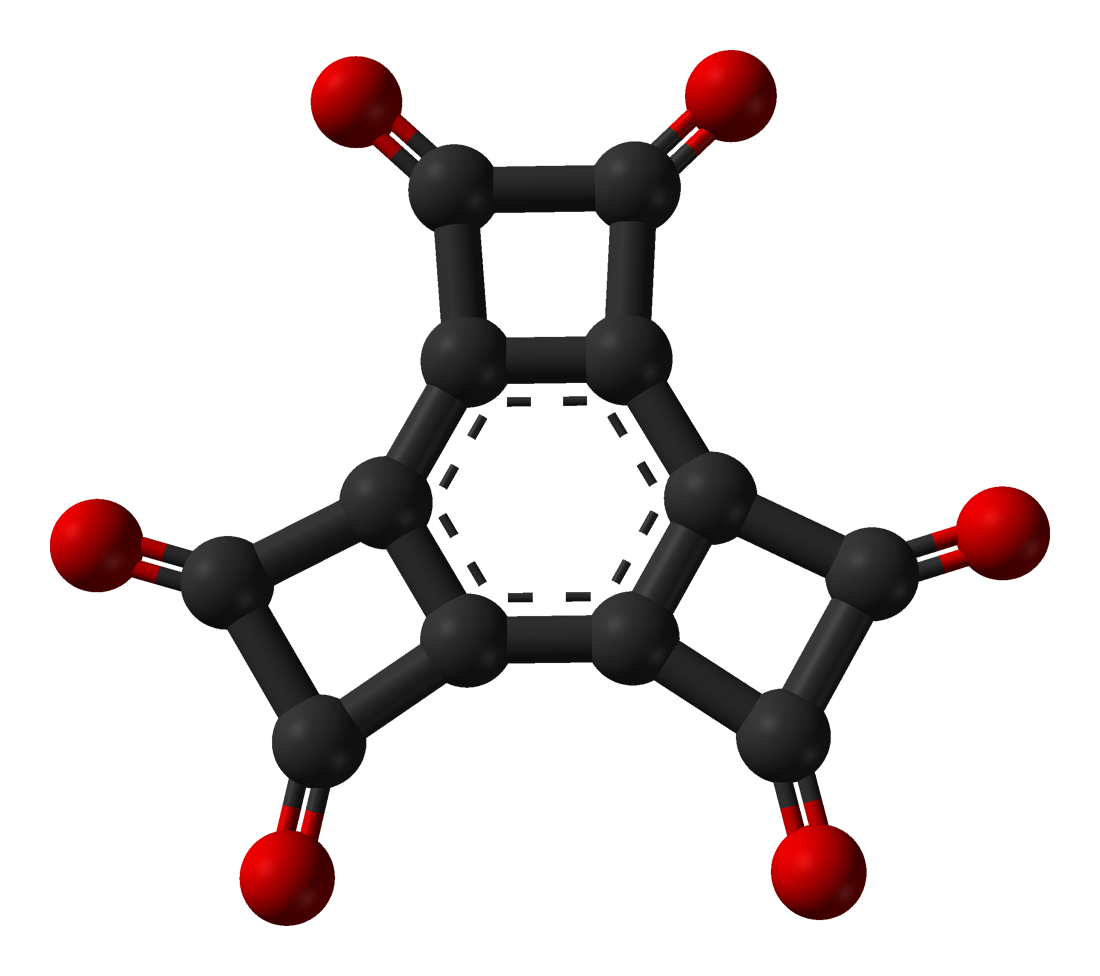
Ball and stick model of hexaoxotricyclobutabenzene

Names
- Preferred IUPAC name Tetracyclo[8.2.0.0^{2,5}.0^{6,9}]dodeca-1,5,9-triene-3,4,7,8,11,12-hexone
- Other names Hexaoxotricyclobutabenzene

Identifiers
| CAS Number | 144191-88-8 |
| 3D model (JSmol) | Interactive image |
| ChemSpider | 57567052 |
| PubChem CID | 60210025 |
| UNII | A2Y7TR37JU |
| CompTox Dashboard (EPA) | DTXSID80733884 |
- InChI: InChI=1S/C12O6/c13-7-1-2(8(7)14)4-6(12(18)11(4)17)5-3(1)9(15)10(5)16 Key: QRXXJVVGRWBSJV-UHFFFAOYSA-N
- SMILES: O=C1C(=O)C2=C3C(=O)C(=O)C3=C3C(=O)C(=O)C3=C12

Properties
| Chemical formula | C_{12}O_{6} |
| Molar mass | 240.12 g mol^{−1} |
- Except where otherwise noted, data are given for materials in their standard state (at 25 °C [77 °F], 100 kPa). verify (what is ?) Infobox references

Hexaoxotricyclobutabenzene is an organic compound with formula C_{12}O_{6}. It can be viewed as the sixfold ketone of tricyclobutabenzene.

It is an oxide of carbon, detected by ^{13}C NMR in 2006.
