= Tuck-in complex =

In organometallic chemistry, a tuck-in complex usually refers to derivatives of Cp* ligands wherein a methyl group is deprotonated and the resulting methylene attaches to the metal. The C_{5}–CH_{2}–M angle is acute. The term "tucked in" was coined to describe derivatives of organotungsten complexes. Although most "tucked-in" complexes are derived from Cp* ligands, other pi-bonded rings undergo similar reactions.

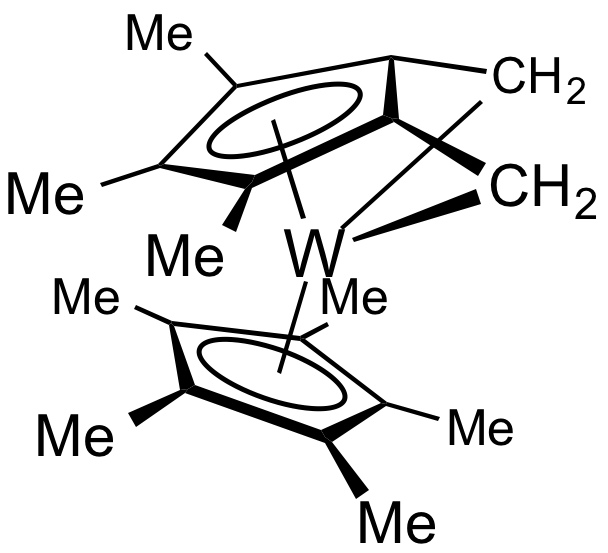
Double tuck-in derivative of decamethyltungstocene.

== Scope and bonding ==
The "tuck-in" process is related to ortho-metalation in the sense that it is an intramolecular cyclometalation. Tuck-in complexes derived from Cp* ligands are derivatives of tetramethylfulvene, sometimes abbreviated Me_{4}Fv. A variety of complexes are known for Me_{4}Fv and related ligands. In these complexes, the Fv can serve as a 4-electron or as a 6-electron ligand.

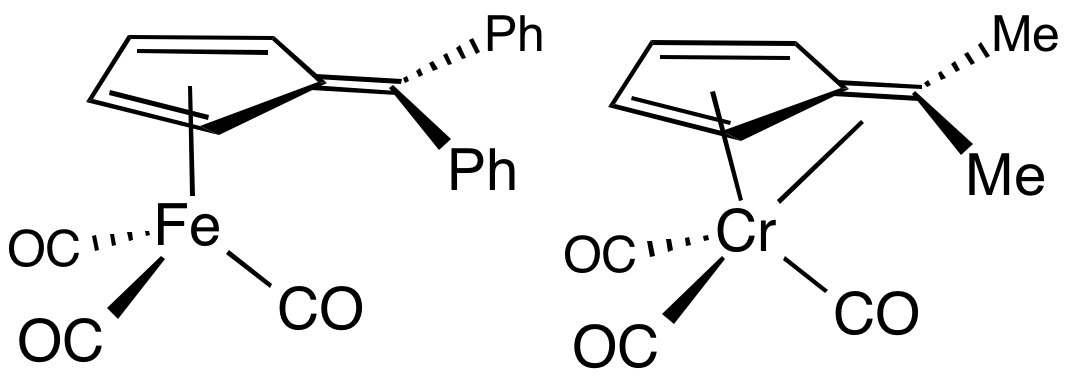
η^{4}- and η^{6}-fulvene complexes.

== Examples ==
The original example proceeded via sequential loss of two equivalents of H_{2} from decamethyltungstocene dihydride, Cp*_{2}WH_{2}. The first dehydrogenation step affords a simple tuck-in complex:

(C_{5}Me_{5})_{2}WH_{2} → (C_{5}Me_{5})(η^{6}-C_{5}Me_{4}CH_{2})WH + H_{2}

The second dehydrogenation step affords a double tuck-in complex:

(C_{5}Me_{5})(η^{6}-C_{5}Me_{4}CH_{2})WH → (C_{5}Me_{5})(η^{7}-C_{5}Me_{3}(CH_{2})_{2})W + H_{2}

In organouranium chemistry, both tuck-in and tuck-over complexes are recognized, for example in the dihydrido diuranium complex [Cp*_{3}(η^{7}-C_{5}Me_{3}(CH_{2}))U_{2}H_{2}]. In this complex the two methylene groups bind to different uranium centers. The tuck-over mode is binding of the Cp* methylene to a metal center elsewhere in the molecule rather than the one coordinated to that Cp* ligand.

== Reactions ==
Tuck-in complexes retain nucleophilicity at the methylene carbon. They can be activated by Lewis acids to generate active catalysts for use in Ziegler–Natta catalysis. The Lewis acid attaches to the CH_{2} group, exposing a vacant site on the electrophilic Zr(IV) centre.
