= Tricyclobutabenzene =

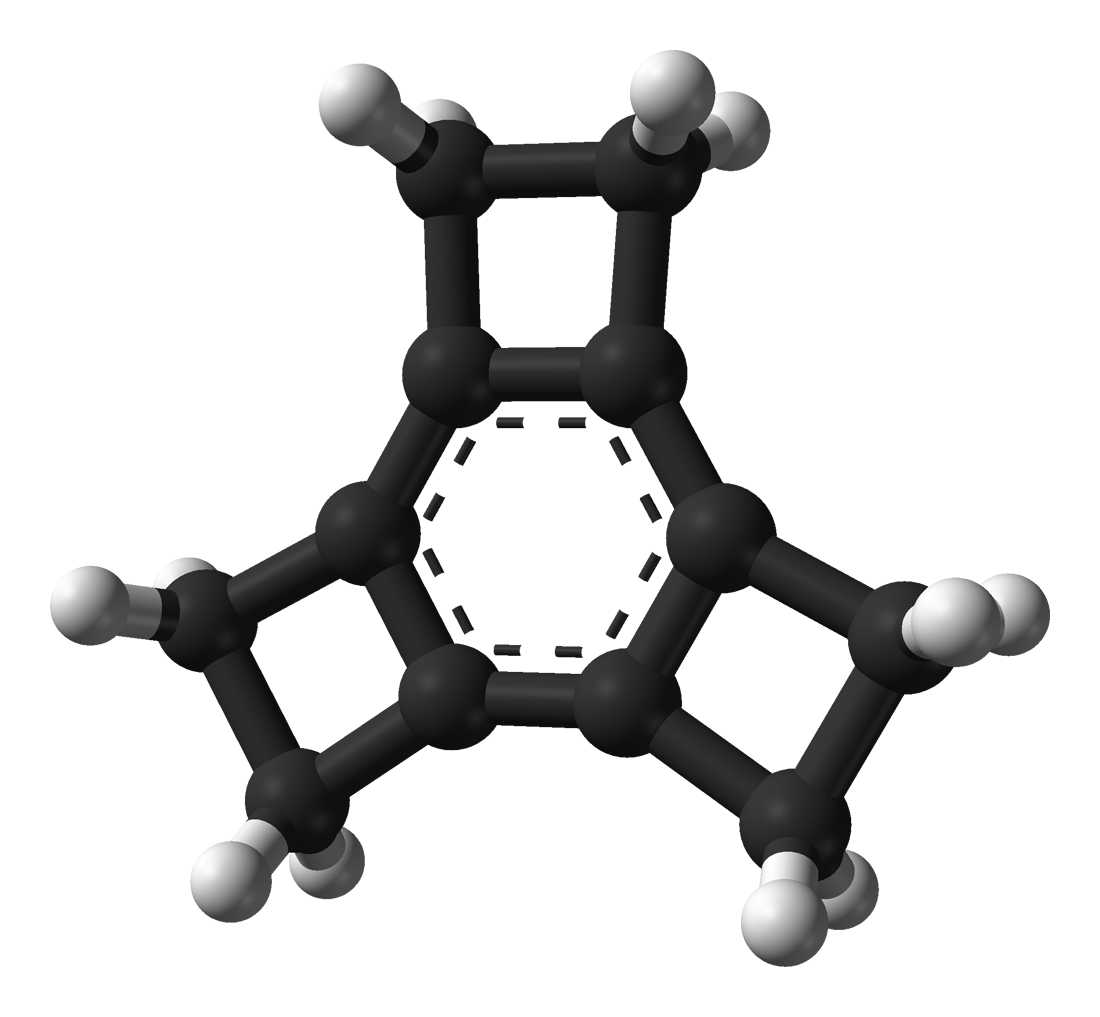

Names
- Preferred IUPAC name Tetracyclo[8.2.0.0^{2,5}.0^{6,9}]dodeca-1,5,9-triene

Identifiers
CAS Number	60323-52-6
3D model (JSmol)	Interactive image
ChemSpider	126777
PubChem CID	143698
CompTox Dashboard (EPA)	DTXSID70209083
- InChI: InChI=1S/C12H12/c1-2-8-7(1)9-3-4-11(9)12-6-5-10(8)12/h1-6H2 Key: MTPUNWSZJLTTLU-UHFFFAOYSA-N; InChI=1/C12H12/c1-2-8-7(1)9-3-4-11(9)12-6-5-10(8)12/h1-6H2 Key: MTPUNWSZJLTTLU-UHFFFAOYAI
- SMILES: c12c4c(c3c(c1CC2)CC3)CC4

Properties
Chemical formula	C_{12}H_{12}
Molar mass	156.228 g·mol^{−1}
- Except where otherwise noted, data are given for materials in their standard state (at 25 °C [77 °F], 100 kPa). verify (what is ?) Infobox references

Tricyclobutabenzene is an aromatic hydrocarbon consisting of a benzene core with three cyclobutane rings fused onto it. This compound and related compounds are studied in the laboratory because they often display unusual conformations and because of their unusual reactivity. Tricyclobutabenzenes are isomers of radialenes and form an equilibrium with them.

The parent tricyclobutabenzene (C_{12}H_{12}) was first synthesised in 1979 by the following sequence: This compound is stable up to 250 °C (482 °F).

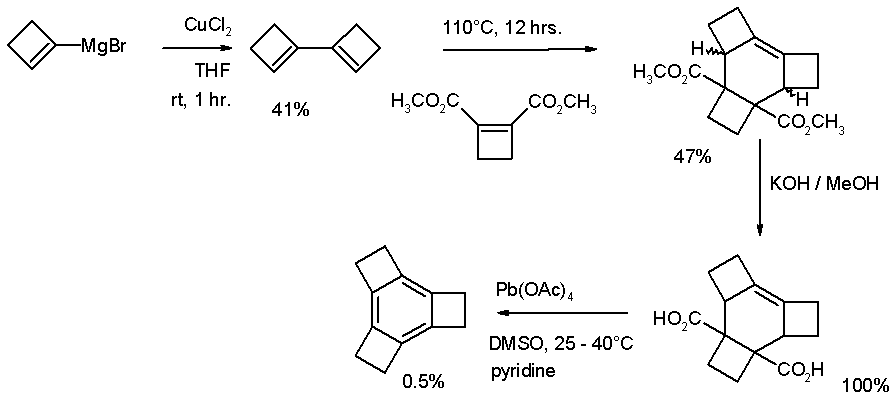

A polyoxygenated tricyclobutabenzene with an extraordinary bond length of 160 pm for the bond connecting two carbonyl groups by the following sequence:

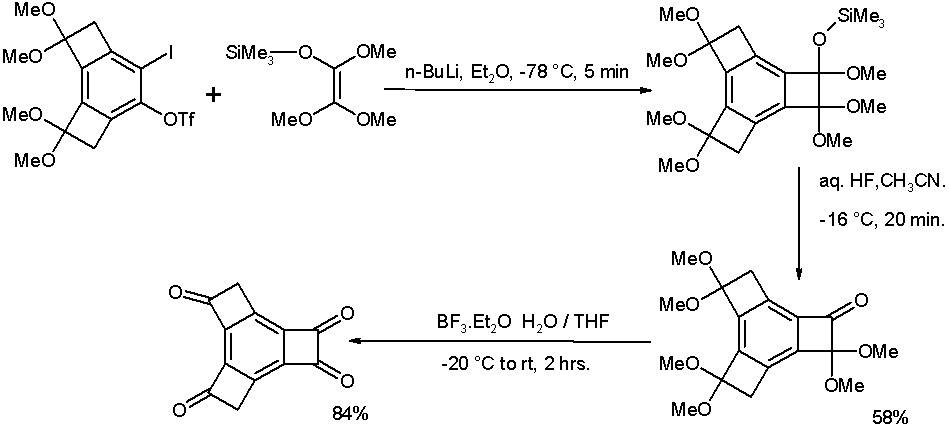

An ordinary bond of this type is only 148 pm and for comparison the C-C bond in isatin is 154 pm long. On the other hand, no change is recorded in the aromatic bond length alternation.

Similar chemistry yielded the six-fold ketone hexaoxotricyclobutabenzene C_{12}O_{6}, which happens to be a novel oxide of carbon. A key starting material is the iodo triflate depicted below which is a benzotriyne synthon.

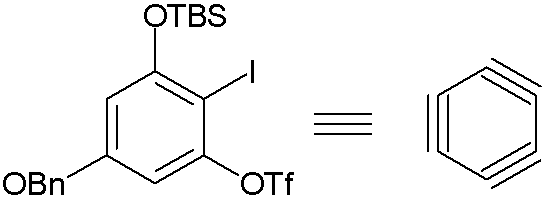

== See also ==
- Biphenyl
- Triphenyl
- Terpyridine
- Terthiophene
- Naphthalene where the rings are fused
