= Carbon sulfide =

Carbon sulfide may refer to:

- Carbon disulfide
- Carbon monosulfide
- Carbon subsulfide
- Sulflower
- Cyclohexanehexathione
