= Dewar reactivity number =

Chemical reactivity index

In Hückel theory, a Dewar reactivity number, also known as Dewar number, is a measure of the reactivity in aromatic systems. It is used to quantify the difference in energy between the π-system of the original molecule and the intermediate having the incoming electrophile or nucleophile attached. It can be used to study important transformations such as the nitration of conjugated systems from a theoretical perspective.

== Computation ==
The change in energy during the reaction can be derived by allowing the orbitals nearby the site i of attack to interact with the incoming molecule. A secular determinant can be formulated resulting in the equation:

$\Delta E=2\beta (a_{r}+a_{s})=\beta N_i$

where β is the Huckel interaction parameter and a_{r} and a_{s} are the coefficients of the highest energy molecular orbital at nearby sites r and s respectively. Dewar's reactivity number is then defined as $N_i=2(a_{r}+a_{s})$.

Clearly, the smaller the value of N_{i}, the less the destabilization energy in going towards the transition state and the more reactive the site. Thus, by computation of the molecular orbital coefficients it is possible to evaluate Dewar's number for all the sites and establish which one will be the most reactive. This has been shown to correlate well with experimental results.

The method is particularly efficient for alternant hydrocarbons in which the coefficients of the non-bonding orbitals involved are very easy to calculate.
