= Alternant hydrocarbon =

An alternant hydrocarbon is any conjugated hydrocarbon system which does not possess an odd-membered ring. For such systems it is possible to undertake a starring process, in which the carbon atoms are divided into two sets: all the carbons in one set are marked with a star such that no two starred or unstarred atoms are bonded to each other. Here the starred set contains the highest number of atoms. When this condition is met, the secular determinant in the Hückel approximation has a simpler form, since cross-diagonal elements between atoms in the same set are necessarily 0.

Alternant hydrocarbons display three very interesting properties:

- The molecular orbital energies for the π system are paired, that is for an orbital of energy $E=\alpha +x\beta$ there is one of energy $E=\alpha-x\beta$.
- The coefficients of two paired molecular orbitals are the same at the same site, except for a sign change in the unstarred set.
- The population or electron density at all sites is equal to unity in the ground state, so the distribution of π electrons is uniform across the whole molecule.

Moreover, if the alternant hydrocarbon contains an odd number of atoms then there must be an unpaired orbital with zero bonding energy (a non-bonding orbital). For this orbital, the coefficients on the atomic sites can be written down without calculation: the coefficient on all the orbitals belonging to the smaller (unstarred) set are 0, and the sum of the coefficients of the (starred) orbitals around them must also be 0. Simple algebra allows the assignment of all coefficients and then normalize them. This procedure permits the prediction of reactivity patterns and can be exploited to calculate Dewar's reactivity numbers for all sites.
