= Sulflower =

Chemical compound

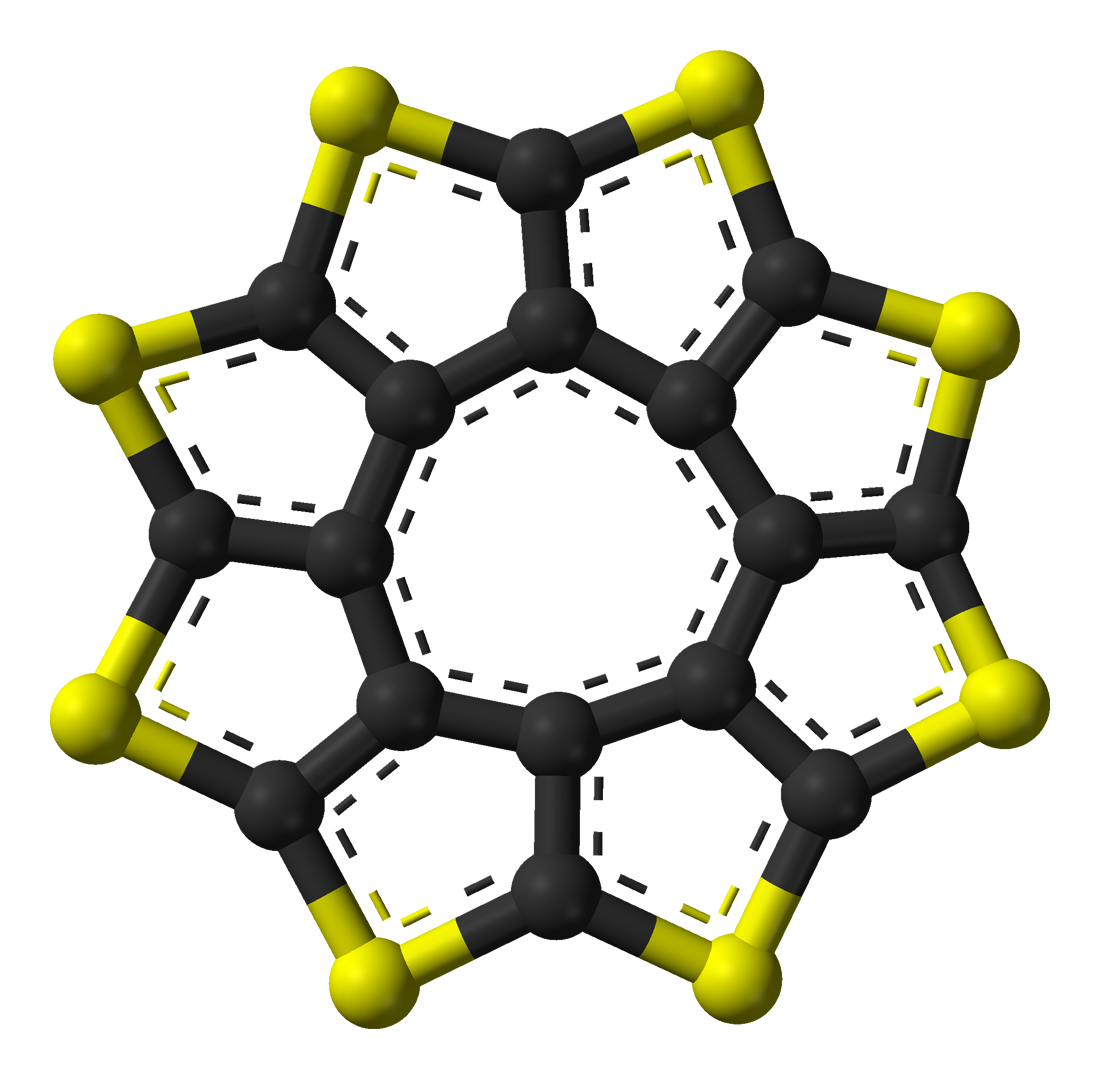
Ball-and-stick model
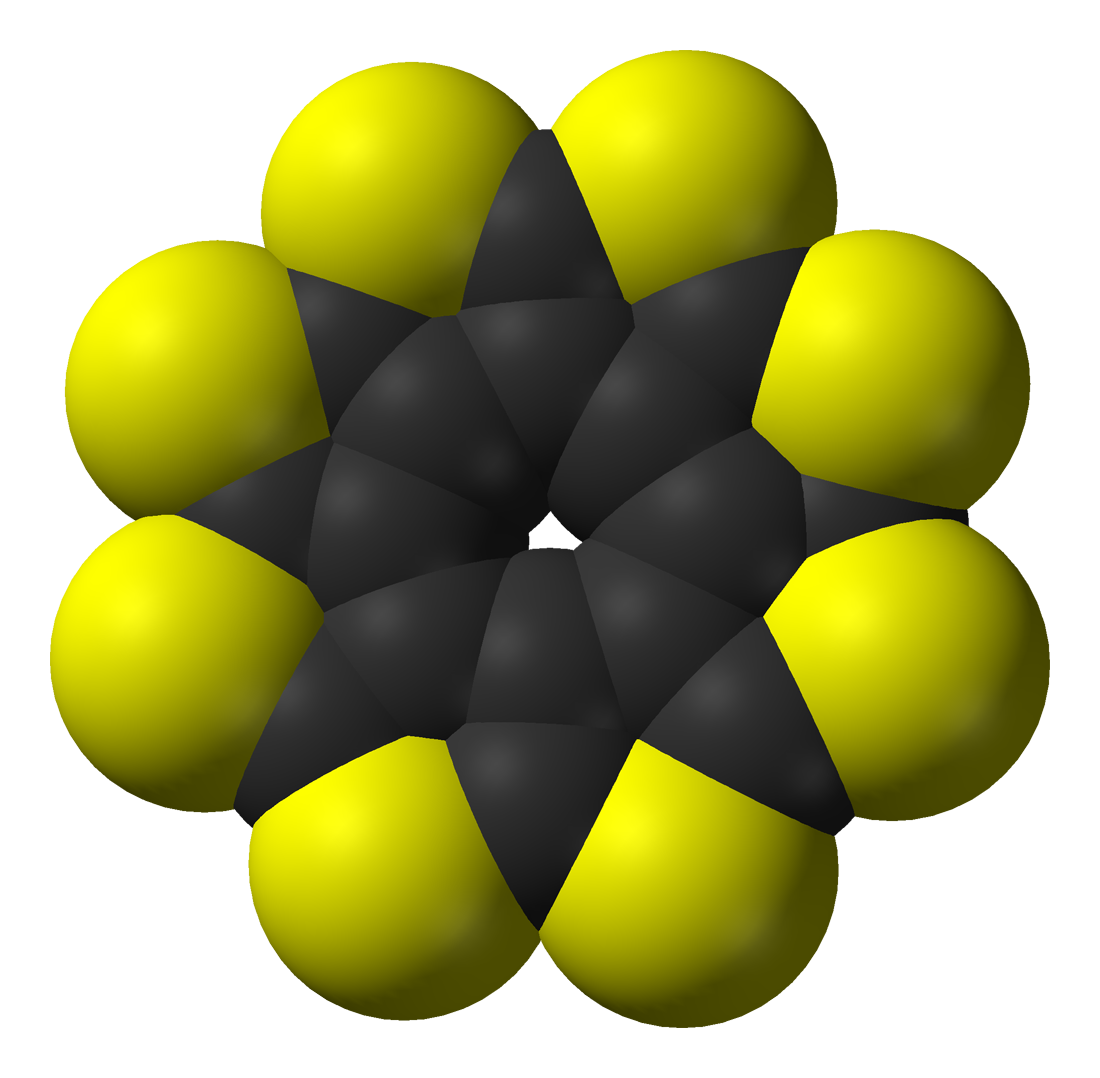
Space-filling model

Names
- Preferred IUPAC name 1,12:3,4:6,7:9,10-Tetrasulfanocycloocta[1,2-c:3,4-c′:5,6-c′′:7,8-c′′′]tetrathiophene
- Other names Octathio[8]circulene

Identifiers
CAS Number	921210-36-8
3D model (JSmol)	Interactive image
ChemSpider	21267678
PubChem CID	101427667
UNII	57MKZ3XDB5
CompTox Dashboard (EPA)	DTXSID00891950
- InChI: InChI=1S/C16S8/c17-9-1-2-4-6-8-7-5-3(1)11(18-9)20-13(5)22-15(7)24-16(8)23-14(6)21-12(4)19-10(2)17 Key: SNTHAZVSUIFTDO-UHFFFAOYSA-N
- SMILES: c12c3c4c5c6c7c8c1c9sc2sc3sc4sc5sc6sc7sc8s9

Properties
Chemical formula	C_{16}S_{8}
Molar mass	448.66 g·mol^{−1}
Appearance	Dark red powder
- Except where otherwise noted, data are given for materials in their standard state (at 25 °C [77 °F], 100 kPa). Infobox references

Sulflower (a portmanteau of sulfur and sunflower) is a stable heterocyclic octacirculene based on thiophene. Sulflower does not contain any hydrogen. With molecular formula (C_{2}S)_{8} the compound is considered a type of carbon sulfide. The molecule is flat and together with the 9-membered homologue is at a local strain energy minimum.

Crystal structure
Stacking of sulflower molecules in the crystal structure	Packing of sulflower molecules in the crystal structure

Its synthesis (a variation of the Ferrario reaction) is based on deprotonation of a tetrathiophene with lithium diisopropylamide followed by reaction with elemental sulfur to a sulfur-substituted intermediate followed by vacuum pyrolysis.

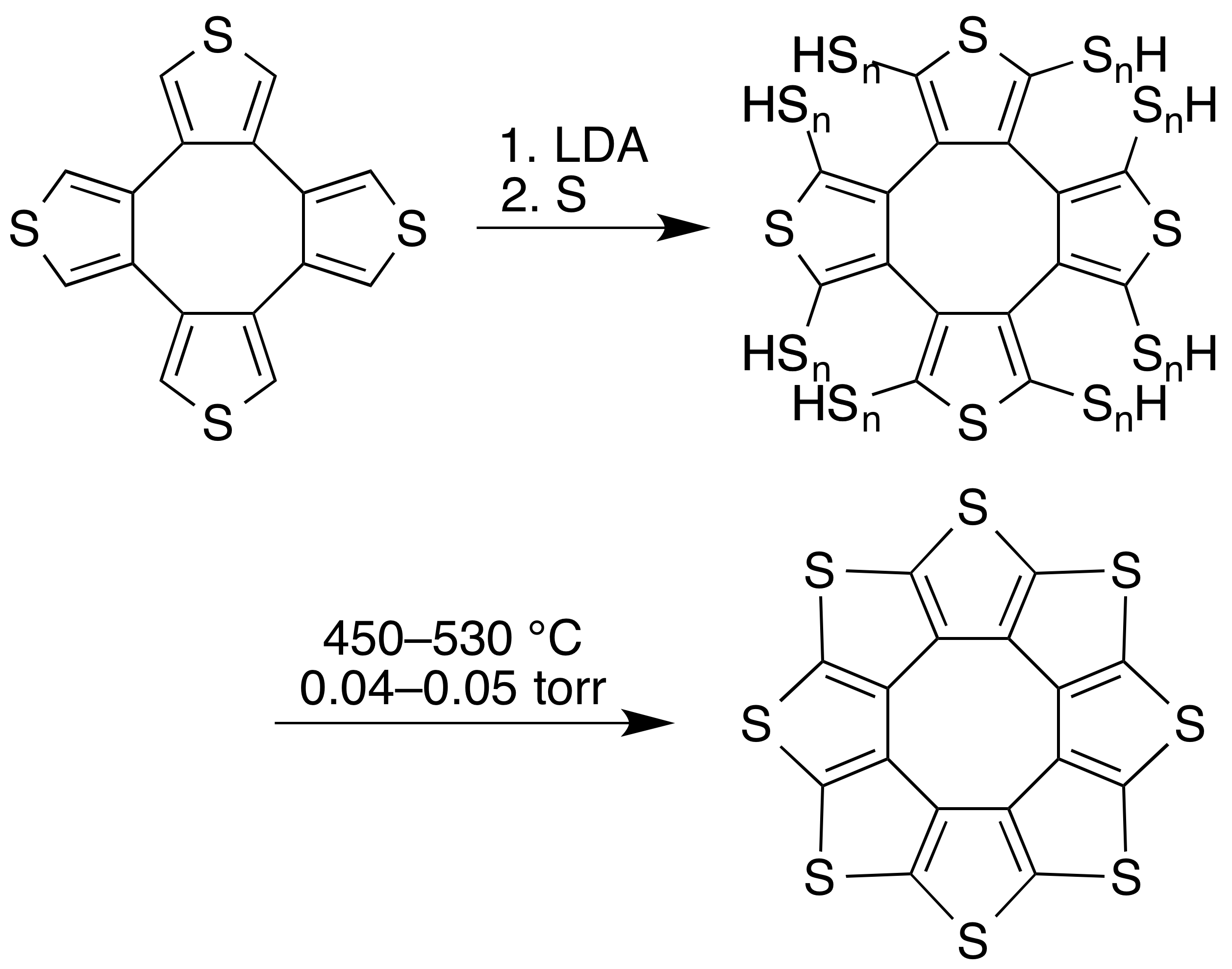
Sulflower synthesis

The sulflower molecule has a planar structure with D_{8h} symmetry, i.e., all eight sulfur atoms as well as the two faces of the molecule are indistinguishable. Because of its planar structure, it is predicted to be able to store many hydrogen molecules between the stacks. The conformation of the H_{2} molecule is calculated to be "standing up" over the five membered rings. Detailed DFT calculations have been performed on these molecules.
