= Alkene =

Hydrocarbon compound containing one or more C=C bonds

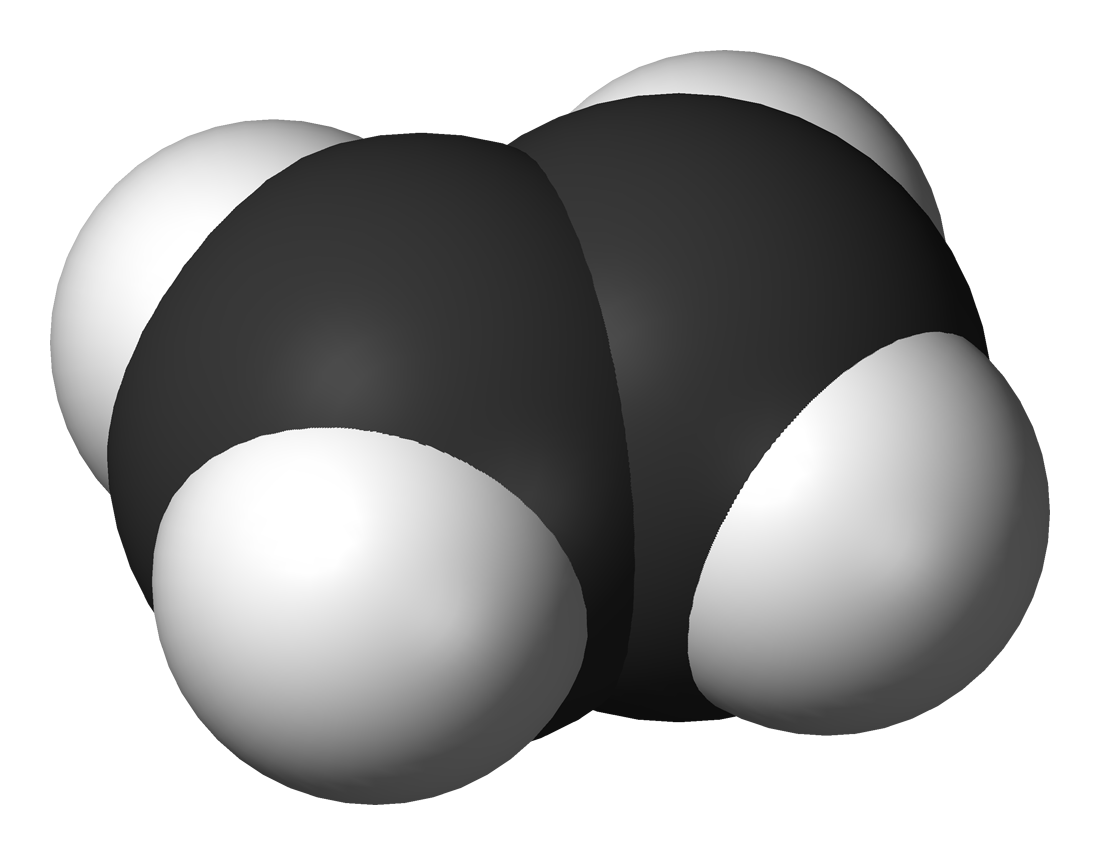
A 3D model of ethylene, the simplest alkene

In organic chemistry, an alkene, or olefin, is a hydrocarbon containing one or more carbon–carbon double bonds. The double bond may be internal or at the terminal position. Terminal alkenes are also known as α-olefins.

The International Union of Pure and Applied Chemistry (IUPAC) recommends using the name "alkene" only for acyclic hydrocarbons with just one double bond; alkadiene, alkatriene, etc., or polyene for acyclic hydrocarbons with two or more double bonds; cycloalkene, cycloalkadiene, etc. for cyclic ones; and "olefin" for the general class – cyclic or acyclic, with one or more double bonds.

Acyclic alkenes having only one double bond (known as mono-enes) form a homologous series of hydrocarbons with the general formula C_{n}H_{2n}, where n is at least two, which is two fewer hydrogens than the corresponding alkane (C_{n}H_{2n+2}). When n is four or more, as in butene, there are isomers that are distinguished by the connectivity of the carbon skeleton and by the position and conformation of the double bond.

Alkenes are generally colorless non-polar compounds, somewhat similar to alkanes but more reactive. The first few members of the series are gases or liquids at room temperature. They are produced industrially by steam cracking and dehydrogenation of hydrocarbons from natural-gas condensate and petroleum. They are used to produce polymers such as polyethylene and as precursors to many industrial chemicals. The simplest alkene, ethylene (C_{2}H_{4}) (or "ethene" in the IUPAC nomenclature) is the organic compound produced on the largest scale industrially.

Aromatic compounds are often drawn as cyclic alkenes, but their structure and properties are sufficiently distinct that they are not classified as alkenes or olefins. Hydrocarbons with two successive double bonds (C=C=C) are called allenes—the simplest such compound is itself called allene—and those with three or more successive double bonds (C=C=C=C, C=C=C=C=C, etc.) are called cumulenes.

== Structure and bonding ==
=== Bonding ===
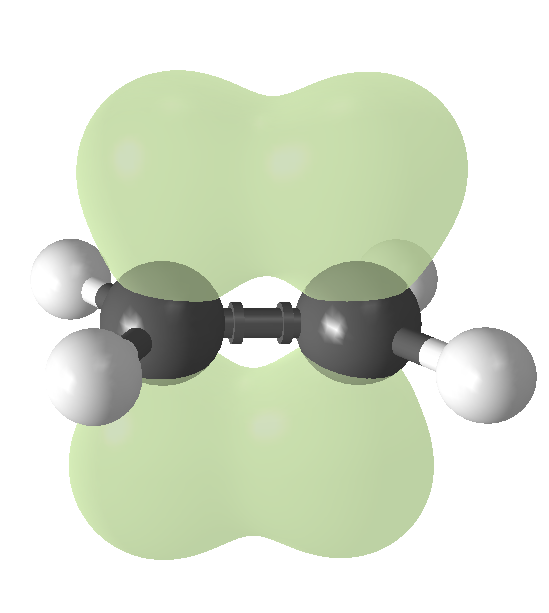
Ethylene (ethene), showing the pi bond in green

A carbon–carbon double bond consists of a sigma bond and a pi bond. This double bond is stronger than a single covalent bond: 611 kJ/mol vs. 347 kJ/mol. Double bonds are shorter than single bonds with an average bond length of 1.33 Å (133 pm) vs 1.53 Å for a typical C-C single bond.

In one bonding model, the carbon atom of the double bond is sp^{2} hybridized. The sp^{2} orbitals form sigma bonds to three atoms (the other carbon atom and two hydrogen atoms). The unhybridized 2p atomic orbital, which lie perpendicular to the plane of the three sp^{2} orbitals, combine to form the pi bond. This bond lies outside the main C–C axis, with half of the bond on one side of the molecule and a half on the other. With a strength of 65 kcal/mol, the pi bond is significantly weaker than the sigma bond.

Rotation about the carbon–carbon double bond is restricted because it incurs an energetic cost to break the alignment of the p orbitals on the two carbon atoms. Consequently cis or trans isomers interconvert so slowly that they can be freely handled at ambient conditions without isomerization. More complex alkenes may be named with the E–Z notation for molecules with three or four different substituents (side groups). For example, of the isomers of butene, the two methyl groups of (Z)-but-2-ene (a.k.a. cis-2-butene) appear on the same side of the double bond, and in (E)-but-2-ene (a.k.a. trans-2-butene) the methyl groups appear on opposite sides. These two isomers of butene have distinct properties.

=== Shape ===
As predicted by the VSEPR model of electron pair repulsion, the molecular geometry of alkenes includes bond angles about each carbon atom in a double bond of about 120°. The angle may vary because of steric strain introduced by nonbonded interactions between functional groups attached to the carbon atoms of the double bond. For example, the C–C–C bond angle in propylene is 123.9°.

For bridged alkenes, Bredt's rule states that a double bond cannot occur at the bridgehead of a bridged ring system unless the rings are large enough. Following Fawcett and defining S as the total number of non-bridgehead atoms in the rings, bicyclic systems require S ≥ 7 for stability and tricyclic systems require S ≥ 11.

=== Isomerism ===
In organic chemistry, the prefixes cis- and trans- are used to describe the positions of functional groups attached to carbon atoms joined by a double bond. In Latin, cis and trans mean "on this side of" and "on the other side of" respectively. Therefore, if the functional groups are both on the same side of the carbon chain, the bond is said to have cis- configuration, otherwise (i.e. the functional groups are on the opposite side of the carbon chain), the bond is said to have trans- configuration.

structure of cis-2-butene

structure of trans-2-butene

(E)-But-2-ene

(Z)-But-2-ene

For there to be cis- and trans- configurations, there must be a carbon chain, or at least one functional group attached to each carbon that is the same for both. E- and Z- configuration can be used instead in a more general case where all four functional groups attached to carbon atoms in a double bond are different. E- and Z- are abbreviations of German words zusammen (together) and entgegen (opposite). In E- and Z-isomerism, each functional group is assigned a priority based on the Cahn–Ingold–Prelog priority rules. If the two groups with higher priority are on the same side of the double bond, the bond is assigned Z- configuration, otherwise (i.e. the two groups with higher priority are on the opposite side of the double bond), the bond is assigned E- configuration. Cis- and trans- configurations do not have a fixed relationship between E- and Z-configurations.

== Isomerism ==
Alkenes having four or more carbon atoms can exist as structural isomers. Most alkenes are also isomers of cycloalkanes. Acyclic alkene structural isomers with only one double bond follow:

- C_{2}H_{4}: ethylene only
- C_{3}H_{6}: propylene only
- C_{4}H_{8}: 3 isomers: 1-butene, 2-butene, and isobutylene
- C_{5}H_{10}: 5 isomers: 1-pentene, 2-pentene, 2-methyl-1-butene, 3-methyl-1-butene, 2-methyl-2-butene
- C_{6}H_{12}: 13 isomers: 1-hexene, 2-hexene, 3-hexene, 2-methyl-1-pentene, 3-methyl-1-pentene, 4-methyl-1-pentene, 2-methyl-2-pentene, 3-methyl-2-pentene, 4-methyl-2-pentene, 2,3-dimethyl-1-butene, 3,3-dimethyl-1-butene, 2,3-dimethyl-2-butene, 2-ethyl-1-butene

In addition to structural isomerism, many of these molecules exhibit stereoisomerism, including cis–trans isomerism about the double bond, and many larger cases are chiral (they exist as enantiomers) arising from asymmetric carbon atoms. The number of isomers increases rapidly with additional carbon atoms.

== Nomenclature ==
Although the nomenclature is not followed widely, according to IUPAC, an alkene is an acyclic hydrocarbon with just one double bond between carbon atoms. Olefins comprise a larger collection of cyclic and acyclic alkenes as well as dienes and polyenes.

To form the root of the IUPAC names for straight-chain alkenes, change the -an- infix of the parent to -en-. For example, CH_{3}-CH_{3} is the alkane ethANe. The name of CH_{2}=CH_{2} is therefore ethENe.

For straight-chain alkenes with 4 or more carbon atoms, that name does not completely identify the compound. For those cases, and for branched acyclic alkenes, the following rules apply:

1. Find the longest carbon chain in the molecule. If that chain does not contain the double bond, name the compound according to the alkane naming rules. Otherwise:
2. Number the carbons in that chain starting from the end that is closest to the double bond.
3. Define the location k of the double bond as being the number of its first carbon.
4. Name the side groups (other than hydrogen) according to the appropriate rules.
5. Define the position of each side group as the number of the chain carbon it is attached to.
6. Write the position and name of each side group.
7. Write the names of the alkane with the same chain, replacing the "-ane" suffix by "k-ene".

The position of the double bond is often inserted before the name of the chain (e.g. "2-pentene"), rather than before the suffix ("pent-2-ene").

The positions need not be indicated if they are unique. Note that the double bond may imply a different chain numbering than that used for the corresponding alkane: (H_{3}C)_{3}C–CH_{2}–CH_{3} is "2,2-dimethyl pentane", whereas (H_{3}C)_{3}C–CH=CH_{2} is "3,3-dimethyl 1-pentene".

More complex rules apply for polyenes and cycloalkenes.

Naming substituted hex-1-enes

=== Cis–trans isomerism ===
If the double bond of an acyclic mono-ene is not the first bond of the chain, the name as constructed above still does not completely identify the compound, because of cis–trans isomerism. Then one must specify whether the two single C–C bonds adjacent to the double bond are on the same side of its plane, or on opposite sides. For monoalkenes, the configuration is often indicated by the prefixes cis- (from Latin "on this side of") or trans- ("across", "on the other side of") before the name, respectively; as in cis-2-pentene or trans-2-butene.

The difference between cis- and trans- isomers

More generally, cis–trans isomerism will exist if each of the two carbons of in the double bond has two different atoms or groups attached to it. Accounting for these cases, the IUPAC recommends the more general E–Z notation, instead of the cis and trans prefixes. This notation considers the group with highest CIP priority in each of the two carbons. If these two groups are on opposite sides of the double bond's plane, the configuration is labeled E (from the German entgegen meaning "opposite"); if they are on the same side, it is labeled Z (from German zusammen, "together"). This labeling may be taught with mnemonic "Z means 'on ze zame zide'".

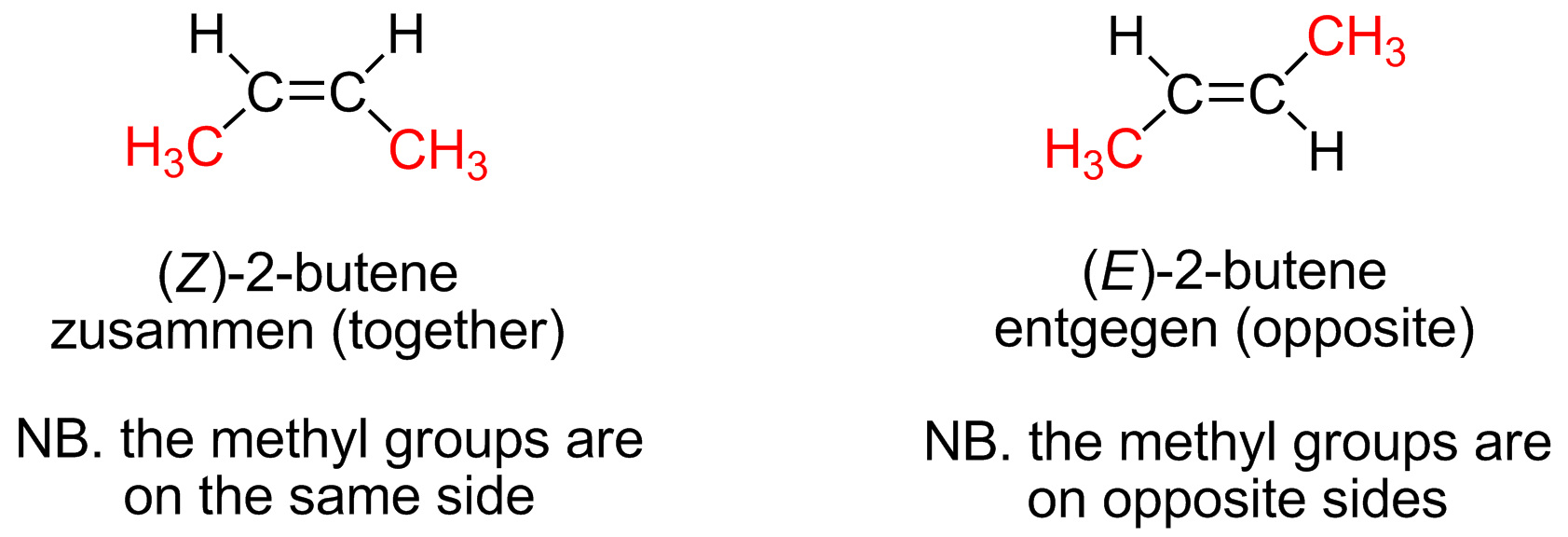
The difference between E and Z isomers

=== Groups containing C=C double bonds ===
IUPAC recognizes two names for hydrocarbon groups containing carbon–carbon double bonds, the vinyl group and the allyl group.

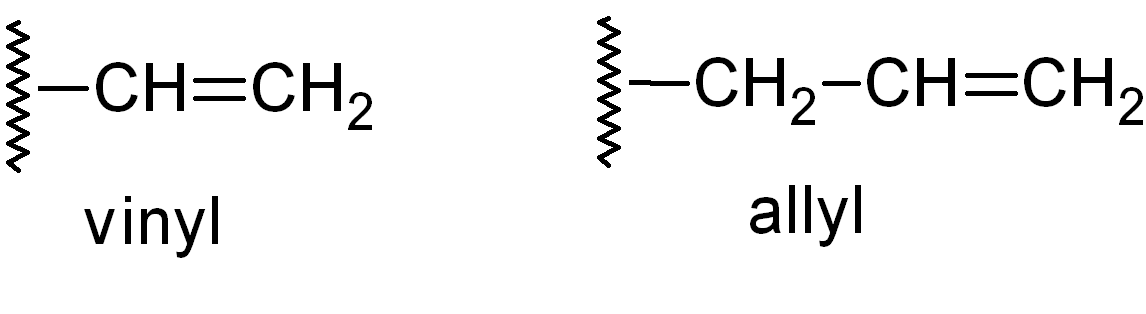

== Physical properties ==
Many of the physical properties of alkenes and alkanes are similar: they are colorless, nonpolar, and combustible. The physical state depends on molecular mass: like the corresponding saturated hydrocarbons, the simplest alkenes (ethylene, propylene, and butene) are gases at room temperature. Linear alkenes of approximately five to nineteen carbon atoms are liquids, and higher alkenes are waxy solids. The melting point of the solids also increases with increase in molecular mass.

Alkenes generally have stronger smells than their corresponding alkanes. Ethylene has a sweet and musty odor. Strained alkenes, in particular, like norbornene and trans-cyclooctene are known to have strong, unpleasant odors, a fact consistent with the stronger π complexes they form with metal ions including copper.

=== Boiling and melting points ===
Below is a list of the boiling and melting points of various alkenes with the corresponding alkane and alkyne analogues.

Melting and boiling points in °C
Number of carbons		Alkane	Alkene	Alkyne
2	Name	ethane	ethylene	acetylene
2	Melting point	−183	−169	−80.7
2	Boiling point	−89	−104	−84.7
3	Name	propane	propylene	propyne
3	Melting point	−190	−185	−102.7
3	Boiling point	−42	−47	−23.2
4	Name	butane	1-butene	1-butyne
4	Melting point	−138	−185.3	−125.7
4	Boiling point	−0.5	−6.2	8.0
5	Name	pentane	1-pentene	1-pentyne
5	Melting point	−130	−165.2	−90.0
5	Boiling point	36	29.9	40.1

=== Infrared spectroscopy ===
In the IR spectrum, the stretching/compression of C=C bond gives a peak at 1670–1600 cm^{−1}. The band is weak in symmetrical alkenes. The bending of C=C bond absorbs between 1000 and 650 cm^{−1} wavelength

=== NMR spectroscopy ===
In ^{1}H NMR spectroscopy, the hydrogen bonded to the carbon adjacent to double bonds has a δ_{H} of 4.5–6.5 ppm. The double bond will also deshield the hydrogen attached to the carbons adjacent to sp^{2} carbons, and this generates δ_{H}=1.6–2 ppm peaks. Cis/trans isomers are distinguishable due to different J-coupling effect. Cis vicinal hydrogens will have coupling constants in the range of 6–14 Hz, whereas the trans will have coupling constants of 11–18 Hz.

In their ^{13}C NMR spectra, double bonds also deshield the carbons, making them have low field shift. C=C double bonds usually have chemical shift of about 100–170 ppm.

=== Combustion ===
Like most other hydrocarbons, alkenes combust to give carbon dioxide and water.

The combustion of alkenes release less energy than burning same molarity of saturated ones with same number of carbons. This trend can be clearly seen in the list of standard enthalpy of combustion of hydrocarbons.

Combustion energies of various hydrocarbons
Number of carbons	Substance	Type	Formula	H_{c}^{ø} (kJ/mol)
2	ethane	saturated	C_{2}H_{6}	−1559.7
2	ethylene	unsaturated	C_{2}H_{4}	−1410.8
2	acetylene	unsaturated	C_{2}H_{2}	−1300.8
3	propane	saturated	CH_{3}CH_{2}CH_{3}	−2219.2
3	propene	unsaturated	CH_{3}CH=CH_{2}	−2058.1
3	propyne	unsaturated	CH_{3}C≡CH	−1938.7
4	butane	saturated	CH_{3}CH_{2}CH_{2}CH_{3}	−2876.5
4	1-butene	unsaturated	CH_{2}=CH−CH_{2}CH_{3}	−2716.8
4	1-butyne	unsaturated	CH≡C-CH_{2}CH_{3}	−2596.6

== Reactions ==
Alkenes are relatively stable compounds, but are more reactive than alkanes. Most reactions of alkenes involve additions to this pi bond, forming new single bonds. Alkenes serve as a feedstock for the petrochemical industry because they can participate in a wide variety of reactions, prominently polymerization and alkylation. Except for ethylene, alkenes have two sites of reactivity: the carbon–carbon pi-bond and the presence of allylic CH centers. The former dominates but the allylic sites are important too.

=== Addition to the unsaturated bonds ===
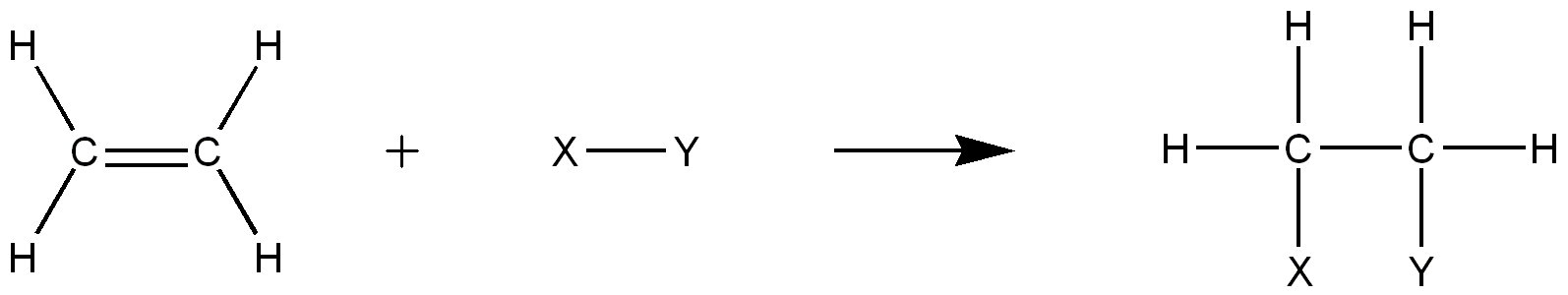
typical electrophilic addition reaction of ethylene

Hydrogenation involves the addition of H_{2} "across" the double bond. The hydrogenation of styrene to form ethylbenzene is described as this equation:

C_{6}H_{5}CH=CH_{2} + H_{2} → C_{6}H_{5}CH_{2}−CH_{3}

Hydrogenation reactions usually require transition metal catalysts such as palladium on carbon or PtO_{2}. The total number of hydrogens that can be added to an unsaturated hydrocarbon depends on its degree of unsaturation.

Comparable to hydrogenation is halogenation, the addition of a halogen molecule, such as Br_{2}, resulting in a dihaloalkane. The bromination of ethylene forms 1,2-dibromoethane:

CH_{2}=CH_{2} + Br_{2} → CH_{2}Br−CH_{2}Br

Unlike hydrogenation, halogenation reactions do not require catalysts. The reaction occurs in two steps, with a halonium ion as an intermediate.

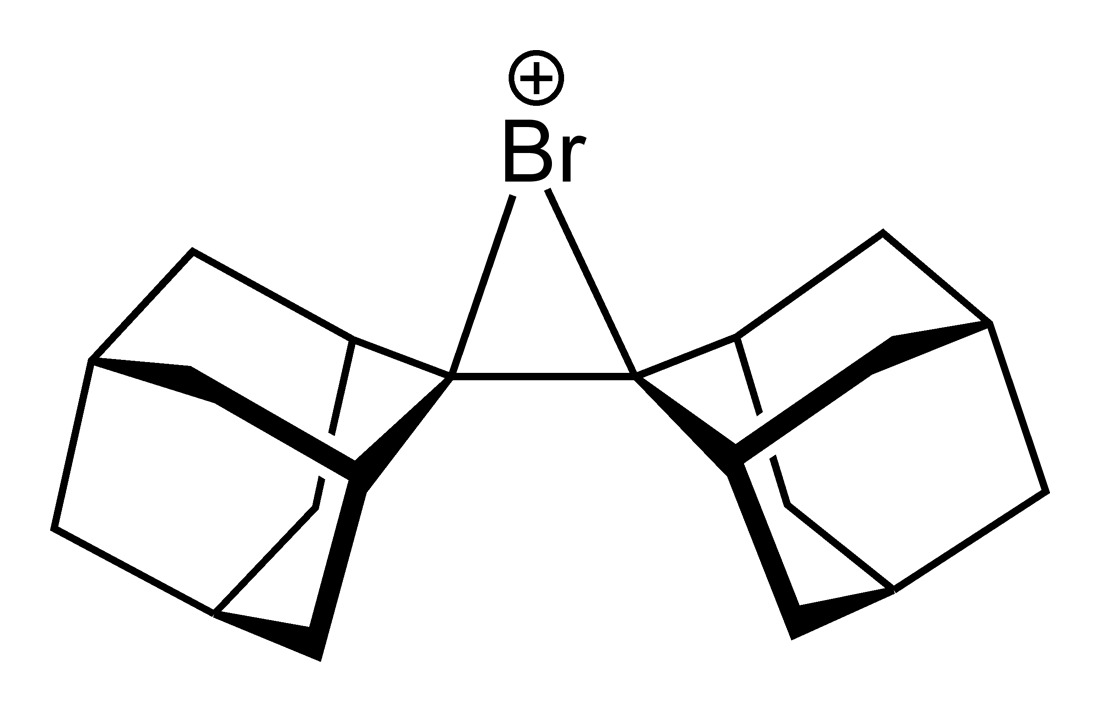
Structure of a bromonium ion

Bromine test is used to test the saturation of hydrocarbons. The bromine test can also be used as an indication of the degree of unsaturation for unsaturated hydrocarbons. Bromine number is defined as gram of bromine able to react with 100g of product.

The π bonds of alkenes hydrocarbons are also susceptible to hydration. The reaction usually requires strong acid as catalyst. The first step in hydration often involves formation of a carbocation. The net result of the reaction will be an alcohol. The reaction equation for hydration of ethylene is:

H_{2}C=CH_{2} + H_{2}O→H_{3}C-CH_{2}OH

Example of hydrohalogenation: addition of HBr to an alkene

Hydrohalogenation involves addition of H−X to unsaturated hydrocarbons. This reaction results in new C−H and C−X σ bonds. The formation of the intermediate carbocation is selective and follows Markovnikov's rule. The hydrohalogenation of alkene will result in haloalkane. The reaction equation of HBr addition to ethylene is:

H_{2}C=CH_{2} + HBr → H_{3}C−CH_{2}Br

=== Cycloaddition ===
a Diels-Alder reaction

Alkenes add to dienes to give cyclohexenes. This conversion is an example of a Diels-Alder reaction. Such reaction proceed with retention of stereochemistry. The rates are sensitive to electron-withdrawing or electron-donating substituents. When irradiated by UV-light, alkenes dimerize to give cyclobutanes. Another example is the Schenck ene reaction, in which singlet oxygen reacts with an allylic structure to give a transposed allyl peroxide:

=== Oxidation ===
Alkenes react with percarboxylic acids and even hydrogen peroxide to yield epoxides:

RCH=CH_{2} + RCO_{3}H → RCHOCH_{2} + RCO_{2}H

For ethylene, the epoxidation is conducted on a very large scale industrially using oxygen in the presence of silver-based catalysts:

C_{2}H_{4} + 1/_{2} O_{2} → C_{2}H_{4}O

Alkenes react with ozone, leading to the scission of the double bond. The process is called ozonolysis. Often the reaction procedure includes a mild reductant, such as dimethylsulfide (SMe_{2}):

RCH=CHR' + O_{3} + SMe_{2} → RCHO + R'CHO + O=SMe_{2}
R_{2}C=CHR' + O_{3} → R_{2}CHO + R'CHO + O=SMe_{2}

When treated with a hot concentrated, acidified solution of KMnO_{4}, alkenes are cleaved to form ketones and/or carboxylic acids. The stoichiometry of the reaction is sensitive to conditions. This reaction and the ozonolysis can be used to determine the position of a double bond in an unknown alkene.

The oxidation can be stopped at the vicinal diol rather than full cleavage of the alkene by using osmium tetroxide, cold and basic KMnO_{4}, or other oxidants:

$$\ce{R'CH=CR2 + 1/2 O2  + H2O  -> R'CH(OH)-C(OH)R2}$$

This reaction is called dihydroxylation.

In the presence of an appropriate photosensitiser, such as methylene blue and light, alkenes can undergo reaction with reactive oxygen species generated by the photosensitiser, such as hydroxyl radicals, singlet oxygen or superoxide ion. Reactions of the excited sensitizer can involve electron or hydrogen transfer, usually with a reducing substrate (Type I reaction) or interaction with oxygen (Type II reaction). These various alternative processes and reactions can be controlled by choice of specific reaction conditions, leading to a wide range of products. A common example is the [4+2]-cycloaddition of singlet oxygen with a diene such as cyclopentadiene to yield an endoperoxide:

Alkenes can be efficiently converted into alkynes using selenanthrene-5-oxide and triflic anhydride.

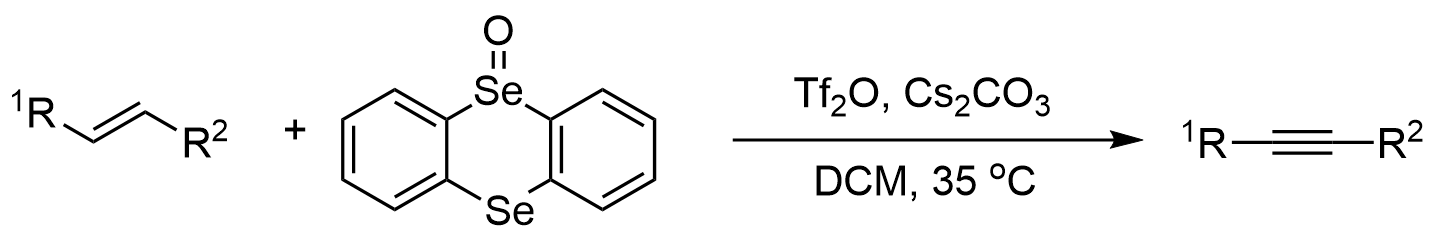

=== Polymerization ===
Terminal alkenes are precursors to polymers via processes termed polymerization. Some polymerizations are of great economic significance, as they generate the plastics polyethylene and polypropylene. Polymers from alkene are usually referred to as polyolefins although they contain no olefins. Polymerization can proceed via diverse mechanisms. Conjugated dienes such as buta-1,3-diene and isoprene (2-methylbuta-1,3-diene) also produce polymers, one example being natural rubber.

=== Allylic substitution ===
The presence of a C=C π bond in unsaturated hydrocarbons weakens the dissociation energy of the allylic C−H bonds. Thus, these groupings are susceptible to free radical substitution at these C-H sites as well as addition reactions at the C=C site. In the presence of radical initiators, allylic C-H bonds can be halogenated. The presence of two C=C bonds flanking one methylene, i.e., doubly allylic, results in particularly weak HC-H bonds. The high reactivity of these situations is the basis for certain free radical reactions, manifested in the chemistry of drying oils.

=== Metathesis ===
Alkenes undergo olefin metathesis, which cleaves and interchanges the substituents of the alkene. A related reaction is ethenolysis:

$$\overset{\text{diisobutene}}{\ce{(CH3)3C-CH=C(CH3)2}} + {\color{red}\ce{CH2=CH2}} \longrightarrow \overset{\text{neohexane}}{\ce{(CH3)3C-CH=}{\color{red}\ce{CH2}}} +  \ce{(CH3)2C=}{\color{red}\ce{CH2}}$$

=== Metal complexes ===
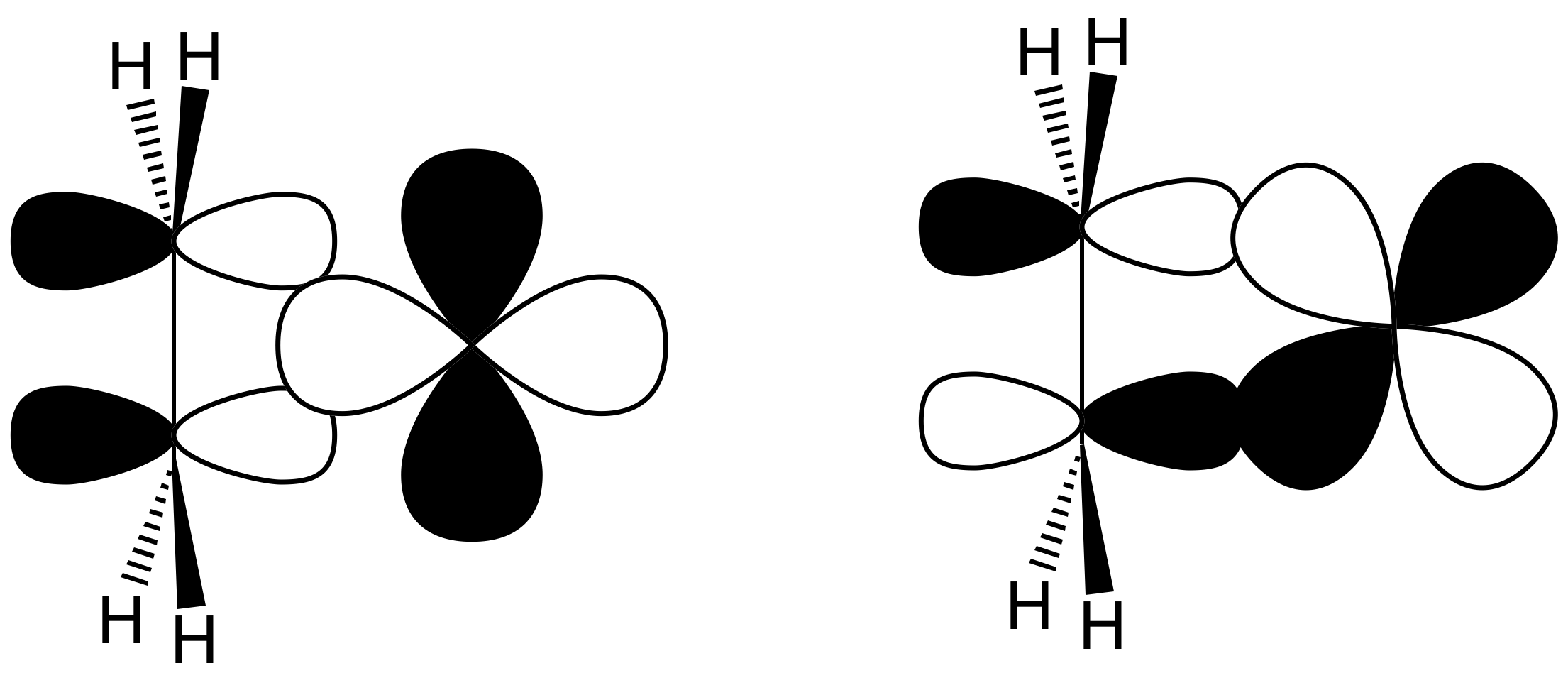
The Dewar-Chatt-Duncanson model for alkene-metal bonding.

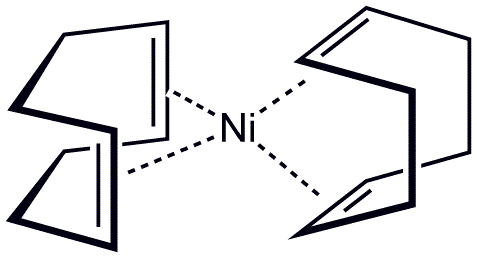
Structure of bis(cyclooctadiene)nickel(0), a metal–alkene complex

In transition metal alkene complexes, alkenes serve as ligands for metals. In this case, the π electron density is donated to the metal d orbitals. The stronger the donation is, the stronger the back bonding from the metal d orbital to π* anti-bonding orbital of the alkene. This effect lowers the bond order of the alkene and increases the C-C bond length. One example is the complex PtCl_{3}(C_{2}H_{4})]^{−}. These complexes are related to the mechanisms of metal-catalyzed reactions of unsaturated hydrocarbons.

=== Reaction overview ===
Reaction name	Product	Comment
Hydrogenation	alkanes	addition of hydrogen
Hydroalkenylation	alkenes	hydrometalation / insertion / beta-elimination by metal catalyst
Halogen addition reaction	1,2-dihalide	electrophilic addition of halogens
Hydrohalogenation (Markovnikov)	haloalkanes	addition of hydrohalic acids
Anti-Markovnikov hydrohalogenation	haloalkanes	free radicals mediated addition of hydrohalic acids
Hydroamination	amines	addition of N−H bond across C−C double bond
Hydroformylation	aldehydes	industrial process, addition of CO and H_{2}
Hydrocarboxylation and Koch reaction	carboxylic acid	industrial process, addition of CO and H_{2}O
Carboalkoxylation	ester	industrial process, addition of CO and alcohol
Alkylation	ester	industrial process: alkene alkylating carboxylic acid with silicotungstic acid the catalyst
Sharpless bishydroxylation	diols	oxidation, reagent: osmium tetroxide, chiral ligand
Woodward cis-hydroxylation	diols	oxidation, reagents: iodine, silver acetate
Ozonolysis	aldehydes or ketones	reagent: ozone
Olefin metathesis	alkenes	two alkenes rearrange to form two new alkenes
Diels–Alder reaction	cyclohexenes	cycloaddition with a diene
Pauson–Khand reaction	cyclopentenones	cycloaddition with an alkyne and CO
Hydroboration–oxidation	alcohols	reagents: borane, then a peroxide
Oxymercuration-reduction	alcohols	electrophilic addition of mercuric acetate, then reduction
Prins reaction	1,3-diols	electrophilic addition with aldehyde or ketone
Paterno–Büchi reaction	oxetanes	photochemical reaction with aldehyde or ketone
Epoxidation	epoxide	electrophilic addition of a peroxide
Cyclopropanation	cyclopropanes	addition of carbenes or carbenoids
Hydroacylation	ketones	oxidative addition / reductive elimination by metal catalyst
Hydrophosphination	phosphines	
Dehydrogenation	alkynes	cycloaddition with a selenanthrene reagent/elimination by base

== Synthesis ==
=== Industrial methods ===
Alkenes are produced by hydrocarbon cracking. Raw materials are mostly natural-gas condensate components (principally ethane and propane) in the US and Mideast and naphtha in Europe and Asia. Alkanes are broken apart at high temperatures, often in the presence of a zeolite catalyst, to produce a mixture of primarily aliphatic alkenes and lower molecular weight alkanes. The mixture is feedstock and temperature dependent, and separated by fractional distillation. This is mainly used for the manufacture of small alkenes (up to six carbons).

Cracking of n-octane to give pentane and propene

Related to this is catalytic dehydrogenation, where an alkane loses hydrogen at high temperatures to produce a corresponding alkene. This is the reverse of the catalytic hydrogenation of alkenes.

Dehydrogenation of butane to give butadiene and isomers of butene

This process is also known as reforming. Both processes are endothermic and are driven towards the alkene at high temperatures by entropy.

Catalytic synthesis of higher α-alkenes (of the type RCH=CH_{2}) can also be achieved by a reaction of ethylene with the organometallic compound triethylaluminium in the presence of nickel, cobalt, or platinum.

=== Elimination reactions ===
One of the principal methods for alkene synthesis in the laboratory is the elimination reaction of alkyl halides, alcohols, and similar compounds. Most common is the β-elimination via the E2 or E1 mechanism. A commercially significant example is the production of vinyl chloride.

The E2 mechanism provides a more reliable β-elimination method than E1 for most alkene syntheses. Most E2 eliminations start with an alkyl halide or alkyl sulfonate ester (such as a tosylate or triflate). When an alkyl halide is used, the reaction is called a dehydrohalogenation. For unsymmetrical products, the more substituted alkenes (those with fewer hydrogens attached to the C=C) tend to predominate (see Zaitsev's rule). Two common methods of elimination reactions are dehydrohalogenation of alkyl halides and dehydration of alcohols. A typical example is shown below; note that if possible, the H is anti to the leaving group, even though this leads to the less stable Z-isomer.

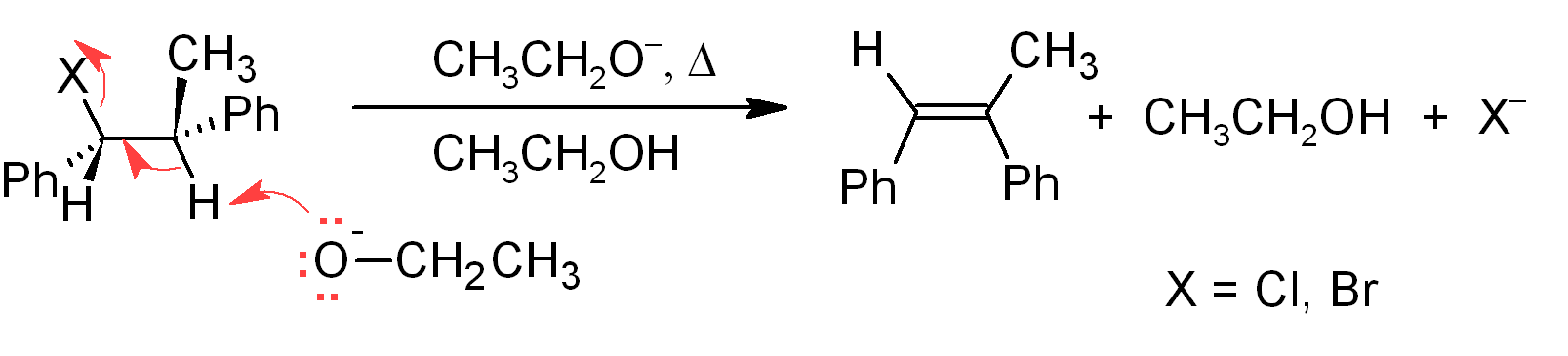
An example of an E2 Elimination

Alkenes can be synthesized from alcohols via dehydration, in which case water is lost via the E1 mechanism. For example, the dehydration of ethanol produces ethylene:

CH_{3}CH_{2}OH → H_{2}C=CH_{2} + H_{2}O

An alcohol may also be converted to a better leaving group (e.g., xanthate), so as to allow a milder syn-elimination such as the Chugaev elimination and the Grieco elimination. Related reactions include eliminations by β-haloethers (the Boord olefin synthesis; also a selenium-based elimination discussed below) and esters (ester pyrolysis). A thioketone and a phosphite ester combined (the Corey-Winter olefination) or diphosphorus tetraiodide will deoxygenate glycols to alkenes.

Alkenes can be prepared indirectly from alkyl amines. The amine or ammonia is not a suitable leaving group, so the amine is first either alkylated (as in the Hofmann elimination) or oxidized to an amine oxide (the Cope reaction) to render a smooth elimination possible. The Cope reaction is a syn-elimination that occurs at or below 150 °C, for example:

Synthesis of cyclooctene via Cope elimination

The Hofmann elimination is unusual in that the less substituted (non-Zaitsev) alkene is usually the major product.

Alkenes are generated from α-halosulfones in the Ramberg–Bäcklund reaction, via a three-membered ring sulfone intermediate.

cis alkenes can be manufactured from trans alkenes through oxidation to the (anti) bromohydrin and then treatment with selenocyanate anion. After the anion displaces bromide with inversion of configuration, the resulting compound rearranges and eliminates cyanate and selenium through cyclic intermediates.

=== Synthesis from carbonyl compounds ===
Another important class of methods for alkene synthesis involves construction of a new carbon–carbon double bond by coupling or condensation of a carbonyl compound (such as an aldehyde or ketone) to a carbanion or its equivalent. Pre-eminent is the aldol condensation. Knoevenagel condensations are a related class of reactions that convert carbonyls into alkenes.Well-known methods are called olefinations. The Wittig reaction is illustrative, but other related methods are known, including the Horner–Wadsworth–Emmons reaction.

The Wittig reaction involves reaction of an aldehyde or ketone with a Wittig reagent (or phosphorane) of the type Ph_{3}P=CHR to produce an alkene and Ph_{3}P=O. The Wittig reagent is itself prepared easily from triphenylphosphine and an alkyl halide.

A typical example of the Wittig reaction

Related to the Wittig reaction is the Peterson olefination, which uses silicon-based reagents in place of the phosphorane. This reaction allows for the selection of E- or Z-products. If an E-product is desired, another alternative is the Julia olefination, which uses the carbanion generated from a phenyl sulfone. The Takai olefination based on an organochromium intermediate also delivers E-products. A titanium compound, Tebbe's reagent, is useful for the synthesis of methylene compounds; in this case, even esters and amides react.

A pair of ketones or aldehydes can be deoxygenated to generate an alkene. Symmetrical alkenes can be prepared from a single aldehyde or ketone coupling with itself, using titanium metal reduction (the McMurry reaction). If different ketones are to be coupled, a more complicated method is required, such as the Barton–Kellogg reaction.

A single ketone can also be converted to the corresponding alkene via its tosylhydrazone, using sodium methoxide (the Bamford–Stevens reaction) or an alkyllithium (the Shapiro reaction).

=== Synthesis from alkenes ===
The formation of longer alkenes via the step-wise polymerisation of smaller ones is appealing, as ethylene (the smallest alkene) is both inexpensive and readily available, with hundreds of millions of tonnes produced annually. The Ziegler–Natta process allows for the formation of very long chains, for instance those used for polyethylene. Where shorter chains are wanted, as they for the production of surfactants, then processes incorporating a olefin metathesis step, such as the Shell higher olefin process are important.

Olefin metathesis is also used commercially for the interconversion of ethylene and 2-butene to propylene. Rhenium- and molybdenum-containing heterogeneous catalysis are used in this process:

CH_{2}=CH_{2} + CH_{3}CH=CHCH_{3} → 2 CH_{2}=CHCH_{3}

Transition metal catalyzed hydrovinylation is another important alkene synthesis process starting from alkene itself. It involves the addition of a hydrogen and a vinyl group (or an alkenyl group) across a double bond.

=== Synthesis from alkynes ===
Reduction of alkynes is a useful method for the stereoselective synthesis of disubstituted alkenes. If the cis-alkene is desired, hydrogenation in the presence of Lindlar's catalyst (a heterogeneous catalyst that consists of palladium deposited on calcium carbonate and treated with various forms of lead) is commonly used, though hydroboration followed by hydrolysis provides an alternative approach. Reduction of the alkyne by sodium metal in liquid ammonia gives the trans-alkene.

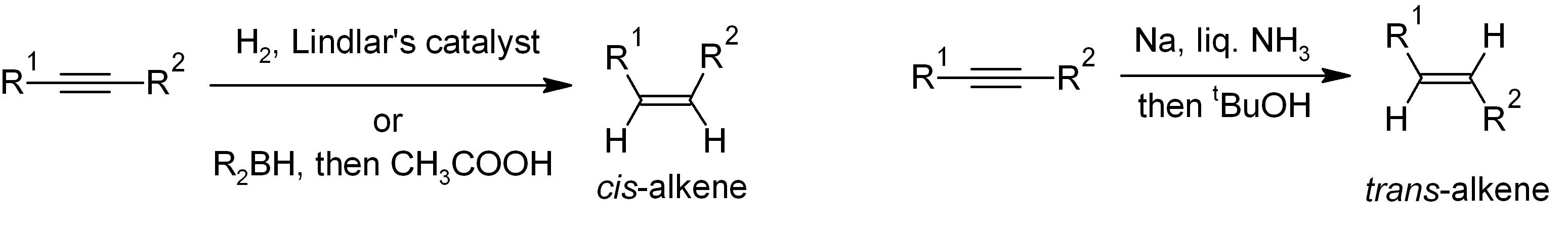
Synthesis of cis- and trans-alkenes from alkynes

For the preparation multisubstituted alkenes, carbometalation of alkynes can give rise to a large variety of alkene derivatives.

=== Rearrangements and related reactions ===
Alkenes can be synthesized from other alkenes via rearrangement reactions. Besides olefin metathesis (described above), many pericyclic reactions can be used such as the ene reaction and the Cope rearrangement.

Cope rearrangement of divinylcyclobutane to cyclooctadiene

In the Diels–Alder reaction, a cyclohexene derivative is prepared from a diene and a reactive or electron-deficient alkene.

== Application ==
Unsaturated hydrocarbons are widely used to produce plastics, medicines, and other useful materials.

Name	Structure	Use
Ethylene		Monomers for synthesizing polyethylene
1,3-butadiene		For manufacturing synthetic rubber
vinyl chloride		Precursor to PVC
styrene		precursor to polystyrene

== Occurrence ==
Alkenes are prevalent in nature. Plants are the main natural source of alkenes in the form of terpenes. Many of the most vivid natural pigments are terpenes; e.g. lycopene (red in tomatoes), carotene (orange in carrots), and xanthophylls (yellow in egg yolk). The simplest of all alkenes, ethylene is a signaling molecule that influences the ripening of plants.

The Curiosity rover discovered on Mars long chain alkanes with up to 12 consecutive carbon atoms. They could be derived from either abiotic or biological sources.

Selected unsaturated compounds in nature

Limonene, a monoterpene.

Humulene, a sesquiterpene.

Taxadiene, a diterpene, precursor to the diterpenoid taxol, an anticancer agent.

Squalene, a triterpene and universal precursor to natural steroids.

== See also ==
- Aromatic hydrocarbon ("Arene")
- Alpha-olefin
- Annulene
- Dendralene
- Radialene
- Nitroalkene

== Nomenclature links ==
- Rule A-3. Unsaturated Compounds and Univalent Radicals IUPAC Blue Book.
- Rule A-4. Bivalent and Multivalent Radicals IUPAC Blue Book.
- Rules A-11.3, A-11.4, A-11.5 Unsaturated monocyclic hydrocarbons and substituents IUPAC Blue Book.
- Rule A-23. Hydrogenated Compounds of Fused Polycyclic Hydrocarbons IUPAC Blue Book.
