= 2,6-Dihydroxypyridine =

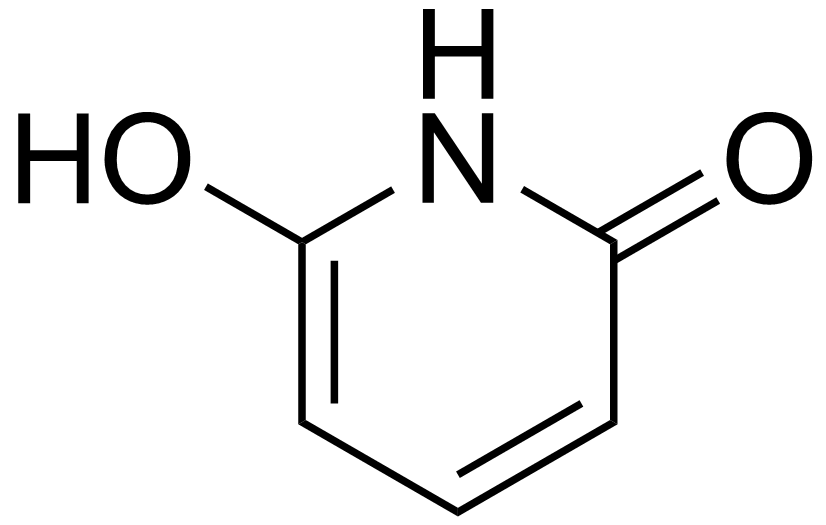

Names
- Preferred IUPAC name 6-Hydroxypyridin-2(1H)-one
- Other names 2 (1H)-Pyridinone 6-Hydroxy-2(1H)-pyridone; 6-hydroxy- (7CI,8CI); 1-Deazauracil; 2-Hydroxy-6-pyridinone 6-Hydroxy-2-pyridone

Identifiers
CAS Number	626-06-2; 10357-84-3 (HCl)
3D model (JSmol)	Interactive image; Interactive image
ChEBI	CHEBI:17681
ChemSpider	62580
ECHA InfoCard	100.009.935
KEGG	C03056
PubChem CID	69371
UNII	54009B6TXP
CompTox Dashboard (EPA)	DTXSID90211643
- InChI: InChI=1S/C5H5NO2/c7-4-2-1-3-5(8)6-4/h1-3H,(H2,6,7,8) Key: WLFXSECCHULRRO-UHFFFAOYSA-N; InChI=1/C5H5NO2/c7-4-2-1-3-5(8)6-4/h1-3H,(H2,6,7,8) Key: WLFXSECCHULRRO-UHFFFAOYAW
- SMILES: C1=CC(=O)NC(=C1)O; O=C1/C=C\C=C(\O)N1

Properties
Chemical formula	C_{5}H_{5}NO_{2}
Molar mass	111.100 g·mol^{−1}
Appearance	colorless crystalline
Density	1.379 ± 0.06 g/cm^{3}
Melting point	190–191 °C (374–376 °F; 463–464 K)
Boiling point	387.2 ± 42.0 °C (729.0 ± 75.6 °F; 660.3 ± 42.0 K)
Solubility in water	Soluble (41g/L)
- Except where otherwise noted, data are given for materials in their standard state (at 25 °C [77 °F], 100 kPa). verify (what is ?) Infobox references

2,6-Dihydroxypyridine is an alkaloid with the molecular formula C_{5}H_{3}N(OH)_{2}. It is a colorless solid. 2,6-Dihyroxypyridine is an intermediate in the degradation of nicotine.

== Preparation ==
2,6-Dihydroxypyridine is an intermediate in the degradation of nicotine by the aerobic bacterium Arthrobacter nicotinovorans. The following reaction shows the formation of the intermediate from L-nicotine of tobacco.

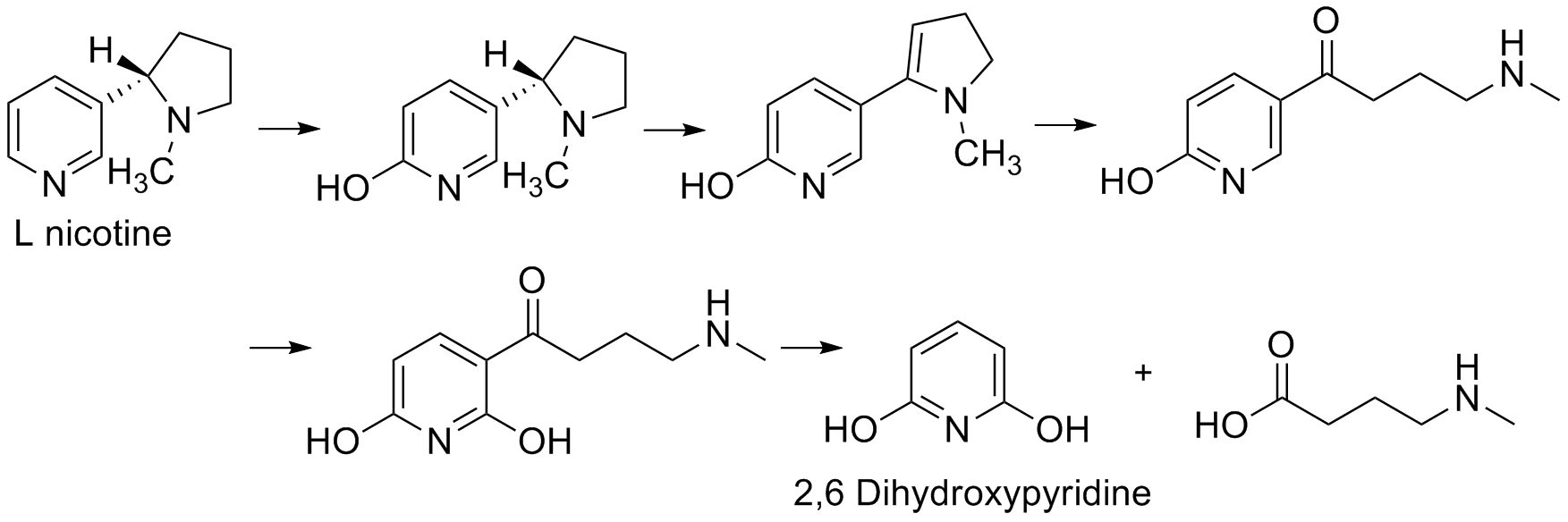

The figure represents the pathway for the degradation of L-nicotine by A. nicotinovorans to 2,6-dihydroxypyridine

Another reaction of 2,6-dihydroxypyridine highlights its function as a substrate for oxygenase. One example is the enzyme monooxygenase, which oxidizes the substrate by transferring one oxygen atom of O2 to the substrate. The other oxygen atom is reduced to water. The product of the oxidase reaction was determined to be 2,3,6-tri-hydroxypyridine because of the results of the stoichiometry as well as the results of the ultraviolet spectrum. This reaction can be shown by the following equation:

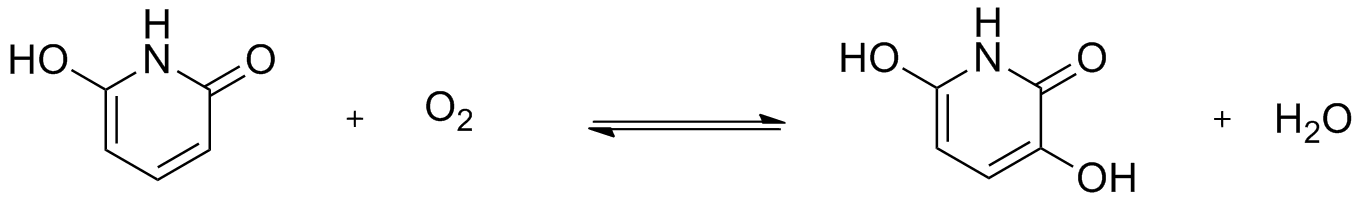

Arthrobacter oxydans, when grown on agar plates, were most active in the oxidation of 2,6-dihydroxypyridine.

== Structure and properties ==
2,6-Dihydroxypyridine in principle can exist in five tautomers:

The distribution of these tautomers is solvent-dependent. Studies show that tautomer II is most common in ethanol, water, and DMSO.

== Other Applications ==
2,6-Dihydroxypyridine has been investigated in an oxidation method of dyeing hair. The process utilizes 2,6-dihydroxypyridine as a coupling agent, and 2,4,5,6-tetraaminopyrimidine as a primary intermediate. This oxidation method intensifies the color of the dyed hair for several days.

== Main Reactions ==
2,6-dihydroxypyridine is a key intermediate in the degradation of nicotine by certain bacteria. The enzyme 2,6-dihydroxypyridine-3-hydroxylase, which is produced in Escherichia coli, is responsible for catalyzing the sixth step of nicotine degradation in the bacterium Arthrobacter nicotinovoran. 2,6-dihydroxypyridine is hydroxylated by hydroperoxy-FAD. This reaction yields 2,3,6-tri-hydroxypyridine. This is shown in the following reaction:

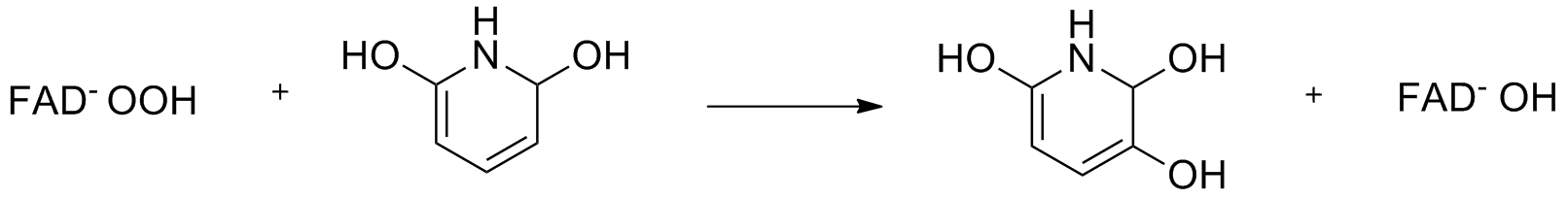

2,6-dihydroxypyridine hydroxylase is a dimeric flavoprotein, with one bound FAD molecule attached. The reaction is NADH-dependent and the enzyme only accepts 2,6-dihydroxypyridine as a substrate. Furthermore, the enzyme is inhibited by 2,6-dimethoxypyridine and 2,3-dihydroxypyridine.
