= Cross-conjugation =

Cross-conjugation is a special type of conjugation in a molecule, when in a set of three pi bonds only two pi bonds interact with each other by conjugation, while the third one is excluded from interaction.

Whereas a normal conjugated system such as a polyene typically has alternating single and double bonds along consecutive atoms, a cross-conjugated system has an alkene unit bonded to one of the middle atoms of another conjugated chain through a single bond. In classical terms, one of the double-bonds branches off rather than continuing consecutively: the main chain is conjugated, and part of that same main chain is conjugated with the side group, but all parts are not conjugated together as strongly. Examples of cross-conjugation can be found in molecules such as benzophenone, divinylketones, p-quinones, dendralenes, radialenes, fullerene, and Indigo dye. The type of conjugation affects reactivity and molecular electronic transitions.
