= N-Methylmaleimide =

Names
- Preferred IUPAC name 1-Methyl-1H-pyrrole-2,5-dione

Identifiers
CAS Number	930-88-1
3D model (JSmol)	Interactive image
ChemSpider	63446
ECHA InfoCard	100.012.024
EC Number	213-226-1
PubChem CID	70261
UNII	P0TFZ8R21Y
CompTox Dashboard (EPA)	DTXSID30239240
- InChI: InChI=1S/C5H5NO2/c1-6-4(7)2-3-5(6)8/h2-3H,1H3 Key: SEEYREPSKCQBBF-UHFFFAOYSA-N; InChI=1/C5H5NO2/c1-6-4(7)2-3-5(6)8/h2-3H,1H3 Key: SEEYREPSKCQBBF-UHFFFAOYAQ
- SMILES: CN1C(=O)C=CC1=O

Properties
Chemical formula	C_{5}H_{5}NO_{2}
Molar mass	111.100 g·mol^{−1}
Melting point	96 °C (205 °F; 369 K)
- Except where otherwise noted, data are given for materials in their standard state (at 25 °C [77 °F], 100 kPa). verify (what is ?) Infobox references

N-Methylmaleimide (NMM) is a naturally-occurring organic compound with the formula of C_{5}H_{5}NO_{2}.

== Spectrum ==
The ^{1}H NMR spectrum of N-methylmaleimide contains two signals: one for the hydrogen atoms of the methyl group and one for the vinylic hydrogen atoms.

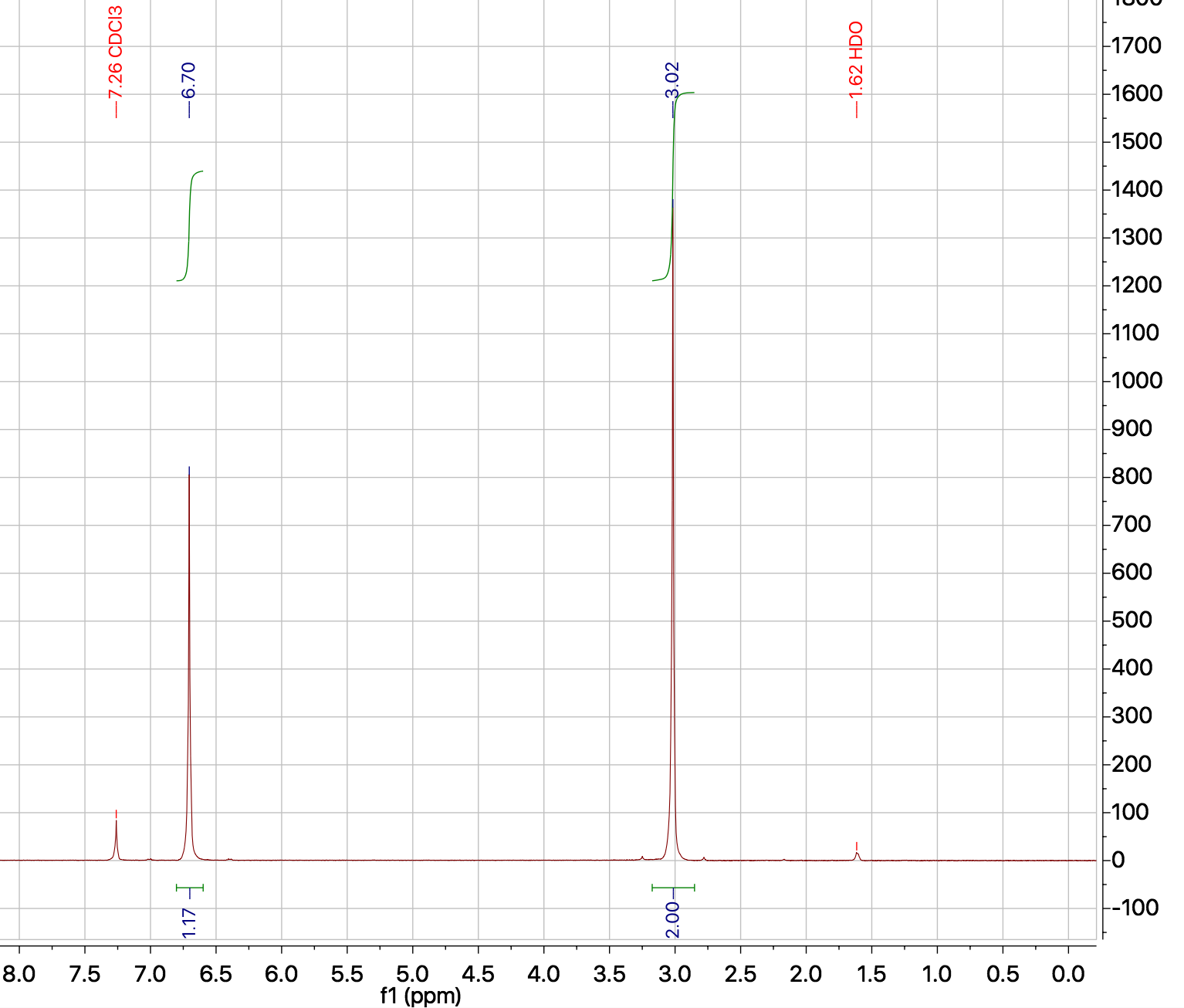
^{1}H NMR spectrum for N-methylmaleimide
