= International Association for Cannabinoid Medicines =

Global medical cannabis doctors' group

IACM
- International Association for Cannabinoid Medicines
- Founded: 2000
- Founder: Franz-Josef „Franjo“ Grotenhermen
- Type: German non-profit registry of Cologne
- Purpose: "Advance knowledge on cannabis, cannabinoids, the endocannabinoid system, and related topics especially with regard to their therapeutic potential"
- Location: Cologne, Germany
- Origins: Germany
- Region served: International
- Key people: Roger Pertwee, Manuel Guzman, Bonni Goldstein, Daniele Piomelli, Francisco Guimaraes, Kirsten Müller-Vahl, Ethan Russo, Raphael Mechoulam, Franjo Grotenhermen, Ilya Reznik, Raquel Peyraube, Carola Pérez, Michael Krawitz, Clare Hodges
- Website: cannabis-med.org and iacmpatients.com
- Formerly called: International Association for Cannabis as a Medicine

The International Association for Cannabinoid Medicines (IACM), formerly known as the International Association for Cannabis as a Medicine, is a non-profit scientific society founded in Cologne in 2000 and dedicated to the advancement of knowledge of cannabis and cannabinoid medicines among medical professionals. IACM is one of the few global non-profit medical societies or associations (Note: A Medical Society is a specific type of trade association for medical professionals.) related to cannabis and Cannabinoids, along with the Society of Cannabis Clinicians and the International Cannabinoid Research Society.

== History ==
The IACM was founded in 2000 as the International Association for Cannabis as a Medicine by a group of members of the German Association for Cannabis as Medicine (Arbeitsgemeinschaft Cannabis als Medizin).

The chairmanship of the board of IACM has been held by different researchers along the years:

- Franjo Grotenhermen (2000–2003)
- Raphael Mechoulam (2003–2005)
- Roger Pertwee (2005–2007)
- Kirsten Müller-Vahl (2007–2009)
- Ethan Russo (2009–2011)
- William Notcutt (2011–2013)
- Daniela Parolaro (2013–2015)
- Mark Ware (2015–2017)
- Manuel Guzmán (2017–2019)
- Kirsten Müller-Vahl (2019–2021)
- Kirsten Müller-Vahl and Manuel Guzmán (2019–present)

== Work ==
The IACM has been known for holding updated lists of medical effects, possible clinical indications of cannabis products and side effects, which are seen by some as a reference.

In June 2018, IACM took part in the open session of the World Health Organization's Expert Committee on Drug Dependence meeting related to medical cannabis and joined an official civil society statement in December 2020 to the United Nations Commission on Narcotic Drugs which resulted in the change of international scheduling of cannabis.

During the COVID-19 pandemic, the Board of IACM issued a statement saying that "there is no evidence that individual cannabinoids [...] or cannabis preparations protect against infection with the SARS-CoV2 virus or could be used to treat COVID-19" while mentioning that the IACM-Bulletin reported on several occasions on laboratory studies suggesting that cannabinoids may have antiviral or antibacterial effects.

== Publications ==
IACM publishes a bi-weekly Bulletin in various languages.

Between 2001 and 2004, IACM edited the scholarly Journal of Cannabis Therapeutics published by Haworth Press. Since 2019, IACM has been one of the official societies of the journal Cannabis and Cannabis Research published by Mary Ann Liebert.

IACM only conducted one own clinical study: a cross-sectional survey completed by 953 participants from 31 countries about their methods of administration of medical cannabis.

== Conferences ==
Starting in 2001 in Berlin, the IACM has been holding biannual scientific conferences in Cologne in 2003, Leiden in 2015, Cologne in 2007 and 2009, Bonn in 2011, Cologne in 2013, Sestri Levante in 2015, Cologne in 2017, Berlin in 2019, and the 20th anniversary conference of 2020 planned to be held in Mexico City took place online due to the COVID-19 pandemic.

The association gives the IACM Awards to "outstanding clinicians and scientists for their major contributions to cannabinoid research and/or to the re-introduction of cannabis into modern medicine." In 2014, IACM former chairman and board member Prof. Raphael Mechoulam was given a special award.

== Patient Council ==
IACM has had patient representatives since 2001, elected as members of the Board of Directors of the organization. In 2019, IACM created the IACM Patient Council, launched in 2022, whose purpose is to bring together groups of medical patient using cannabis and cannabinoids, in order for them to share their experience. The statutory articles of IACM describe the Patient Council as follows:

The IACM Patient Council consists of patients, caregivers of patients and nominees from IACM Partner Organisations, who want to support the work of the IACM. The number of members may be limited by the Board of Directors. Members counsel the board with regard to patient issues. Members of the IACM Patient Council may organize their own activities within the framework of the IACM and its conferences.

List of IACM patient representatives
Title	Period	Name	Country	Organization
IACM patient representative	2001–2011	Clare Hodges	UK	Alliance for Cannabis Therapeutics
IACM patient representative	2011–2019	Michael Krawitz	USA	Veterans for Medical Cannabis Access
IACM patient representative	2011–2019	Alison Myrden	Canada	Law Enforcement Action Partnership
IACM patient representative	2011–2019	Sarah Martin	UK	n/a
IACM patient representative	2017–2019	Sébastien Béguerie	France	Union Francophone pour les Cannabinoïdes en Médecine
IACM patient representative	2017–2019	Maximilian Plenert	Germany	Deutscher Hanfverband
Manager of the IACM patient council	2019–present	Carola Pérez	Spain	Observatorio Español del Cannabis Medicinal

== See also ==
- Cannabis Science
