= Cannabis and Cannabinoid Research =

- Discipline: Cannabis, medical marijuana, endocannabinoid system
- Language: English
- Edited by: Daniele Piomelli

Publication details
- History: 2016–present
- Publisher: Mary Ann Liebert
- Frequency: Quarterly
- Open access: Delayed
- Impact factor: 5.764

Standard abbreviations
- ISO 4: Cannabis Cannabinoid Res.

Indexing
- CODEN: CCRAEP
- ISSN: 2578-5125 (print); 2378-8763 (web)
- LCCN: 2018200571
- JSTOR: 23788763
- OCLC no.: 908209431

Links
- Journal homepage

Cannabis and Cannabinoid Research is a quarterly peer-reviewed academic journal published by Mary Ann Liebert since 2016 and "dedicated to the scientific, medical, and psychosocial exploration of clinical cannabis, cannabinoids, and the biochemical mechanisms of endocannabinoids". The editor-in-chief is Daniele Piomelli (University of California, Irvine). It is the official journal of the Association of Cannabis Specialists, the International Association for Cannabinoid Medicines, and the International Cannabinoid Research Society.
