= Society of Cannabis Clinicians =

American cannabis education non-profit

Society of Cannabis Clinicians (SCC)
- Founded: 1999
- Founder: Tod H. Mikuriya
- Type: 501(c)(3)
- Origins: California
- Region served: Global
- Key people: Tod H. Mikuriya; Jeffrey Hergenrather; Genester Wilson King; Stephen Robinson; David Frederick Hepburn; Dustin Sulak; Fred Gardner
- Website: cannabisclinicians.org
- Formerly called: California Cannabis Research Medical Group (CCRMG)

The Society of Cannabis Clinicians (SCC) is a 501(c)(3) non-profit organization registered in the United States, dedicated to educating healthcare professionals about the medical use of cannabis. Its mission is to unite into one association members of the various medical specialties and allied professionals with this common purpose. SCC is one of the oldest active organization of its kind, and one of the few global non-profit medical societies (Note: A Medical Society is a specific type of trade association for medical professionals.) related to cannabis and cannabinoids, along with the International Cannabinoid Research Society and the International Association for Cannabinoid Medicines.

== History ==
The group was first established in 1999 by California-based psychiatrist Tod Mikuriya, MD as a project of the California Cannabis Research Medical Group to facilitate voluntary medical standards for physician-approved cannabis under California law (HSC §11362.5).

=== Early years: the California Cannabis Research Medical Group ===
The California Cannabis Research Medical Group (CCRMG) was established as a 501c3 non-profit by Tod Mikuriya in 1999, to help physicians share and exchange data about cannabis use by their patients, essentially in California around the San Francisco area. The CCRMG members published their research findings, such as president Jeffrey Hergenrather's survey of patients with Crohn's disease, in the unconventional Journal of Cannabis in Clinical Practice O'Shaughnessy, and developed an online research archive. CCMRG maintained the William B. O'Shaughnessy Archives.

=== After 2004: Society of Cannabis Clinicians ===
After 2004, SCC progressively took over the CCRMG as it started expanding beyond California, as other US States opened access to medical cannabis.

In 2015, SCC launched a Medical Cannabis Continuing Education program, worth 12 CME credits, which in sequential order, a series of 12 courses designed to take a practicing clinician from the basics of the plant, its history and the underlying physiologic (endocannabinoid) system to the pharmacology and clinical practice of medical cannabis.

=== 2020s: Internationalization ===
In 2019, SCC started an International Committee and launched several national chapters outside the United States, claiming presence in 21 countries and three active chapters.

In 2020, the SCC submitted contributions to the UN High Commissioner for Human Rights during the COVID-19 pandemic in relation with access to medical cannabis and the rights of people who use drugs. SCC also contributed to the United Nations Commission on Narcotic Drugs in relation with the recommendations of the World Health Organization to withdraw cannabis and cannabis resin from Schedule IV of the Single Convention on Narcotic Drugs.

In 2021, SCC engaged in the field of veterinary medicine with the launch of an International Veterinary Cannabis Alliance.

== Organisation and activities ==
SCC members hold quarterly meetings of physicians and allied professionals featuring presentations by clinicians, researchers, and legal experts in the medical cannabis field.

The society runs five thematic committees (Editorial, Education, International, Outreach, and Research) for members to share their areas of expertise in the fields that relate to the medical uses of cannabis and cannabinoids.
