= Fred Gardner (activist) =

American political organizer and author

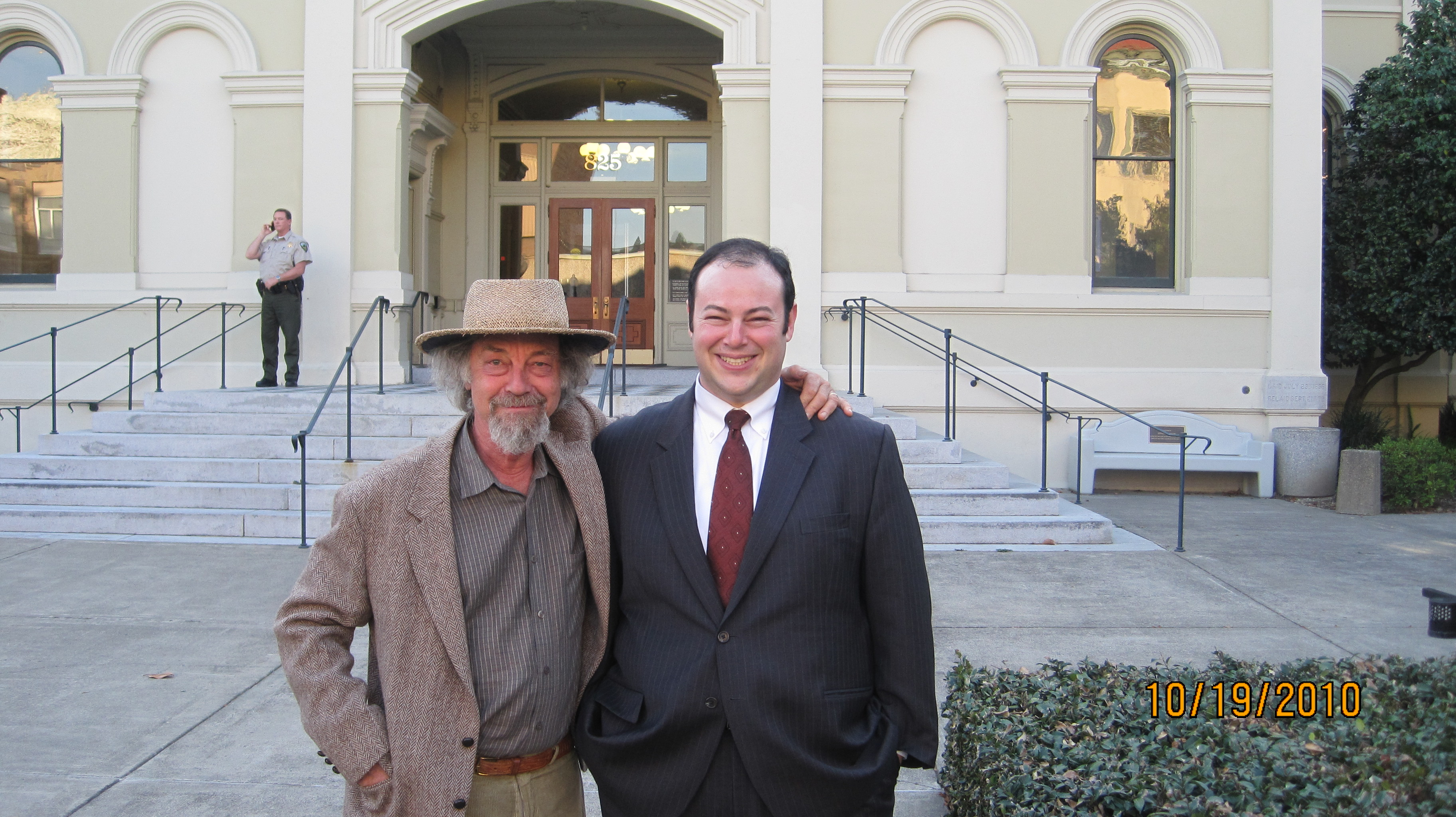
Fred with Abe, his second youngest son.

Fred Gardner is an American political organizer and author best known for his opposition to the Vietnam War and his writings about the medical marijuana movement in the United States.

== Biography ==
Gardner received his bachelor's degree from Harvard in 1963. He has been an editor at Scientific American and Ramparts, a private detective, a songwriter, an author, a freelance journalist, one of the credited screenwriters for Zabriskie Point directed by Michelangelo Antonioni, the owner of Variety Home Video, the editor of Synapse (the UCSF Medical Center weekly), Public Information Officer for the San Francisco District Attorney's Office, and the editor of O'Shaughnessy's Journal of Cannabis in Clinical Practice.

In the fall of 1967, Gardner, with Donna Mickleson and Deborah Rossman, started a coffeehouse in Columbia, South Carolina, that became a hang-out for GIs, an alternative USO called the UFO (United Freedom Organization). Gardner covered the court martial of 27 GIs charged with mutiny at the Presidio of San Francisco in October 1968 and wrote a book about the case, The Unlawful Concert, published by Viking in 1970 and reissued by Gryphon Press in 2005. In April 1970, Gardner worked as a stage manager for Free The Army (FTA) tour with actors Jane Fonda and Donald Sutherland. This traveling road show for soldiers was meant to counter USO shows put on by Bob Hope.

As a journalist in the 1970s, Gardner helped break the story that the US government was funding the spraying of paraquat by helicopter to defoliate Mexican marijuana fields. Farmers had been harvesting plants before the poison could work, selling it, and US consumers were inhaling paraquat-laced pot.

Gardner also helped expose the hidden ownership of Erhard Seminars Training, and Eli Lilly ’s strategy of marketing Prozac by publicizing the prevalence of clinical depression. In 1999, he foresaw and wrote about the medical and political significance of cannabidiol (CBD), a non-psychoactive compound in cannabis that may have diverse medical benefits.

O’Shaughnessy’s was launched by Gardner in 2003 at the urging of Tod Mikuriya, founder of the Society of Cannabis Clinicians. It is distributed by SCC doctors to their patients. An offshoot of O’Shaughnessy’s, Project CBD, expedited demand for and production of CBD-dominant cannabis in the U.S.

Gardner is a frequent and long-time contributor to CounterPunch and the Anderson Valley Advertiser.

Gardner lives in Alameda, California, with his wife Marci. He has six sons and a daughter.

== See also ==
- G.I. coffeehouses
