= David Frederick Hepburn =

- Born: August 5, 1958; Canada
- Education: University of Ottawa
- Occupation: Doctor of Medicine
- Known for: medical director of the 1994 Commonwealth Games in gymnastics
- Works: The Doctor Is In(sane)
- Awards: Columnist of the Year
- Website: drdavehepburn.com

David Frederick Hepburn (born August 5, 1958) is a Canadian author and a retired medical doctor. He was a Canadian naval surgeon in the Persian Gulf War in 1991. He is the author of the book Doctor is In(sane) and he also writes columns by the names "Dave Barry of medicine" and the "Patch Adams of the podium" which are published simultaneously in Canada and the United States, as well as a radio show called "WiseQuack." He received the "Columnist of the Year" award for both the Arizona Newspaper Association and the Canadian Community Newspaper Association.

Hepburn is a recipient of the Canadian Community Newspaper Association columnist of the year award as well as the Arizona Newspaper Association columnist of the year. " He advocates for broader use of medical marijuana and cannabinoids. He is a member of the Society of Cannabis Clinicians (SCC), International Association for Cannabinoid Medicines (IACM), the Canadian Consortium for the Investigation of Cannabinoids (CCIC) and Physicians for Medical Cannabis (PMC).

== Early years ==
Dr. Hepburn was born in Canada. He earned his Doctorate in Medicine at the University of Ottawa on 1986. He served his rotating internship at the Royal Jubilee Hospital in 1987 at Victoria, British Columbia and eventually moved into private practice at NGO.

== Medical and professional career ==
Hepburn was a Canadian naval surgeon in the Persian Gulf War in 1991. He was the medical director of the 1994 Commonwealth Games in gymnastics, and the former team doctor to national rugby teams, as well as junior and professional hockey teams. From 1995 to 1999 he worked at the General Practice department at the Esquimalt Medical Treatment Center. In 1999 he started working at the Yates & Quadra Medical. On 2005, he served as Clinical Instructor for Nurse Practitioners from B.C., two years later he started working as Clinical Faculty at UBC School of Medicine.

== Published work ==
- The Doctor Is In(sane): Indispensable Advice from Dr. Dave
