= C14H14 =

The molecular formula C_{14}H_{14} (molar mass: 182.26 g/mol, exact mass: 182.1096 u) may refer to:

- Bibenzyl
- Cyclotetradecaheptaene, or [14]annulene
