= Piomelli =

Piomelli is an Italian surname. Notable people with the surname include:

- Daniele Piomelli (fl. 1983), American neuroscientist
- M. Rosaria Piomelli (born 1937), American architect
