= Annulyne =

Conjugated hydrocarbon ring molecules with at least one triple bond

In organic chemistry, annulynes or dehydroannulenes are conjugated monocyclic hydrocarbons with alternating single and double bonds in addition to at least one triple bond.

Annulynes

They are related to annulenes, which only have alternating single and double bonds. The smallest member of this class is [4]annulyne but is never observed because the molecule carries too much angle strain. The next member is [6]annulyne or benzyne which is a reactive intermediate well known in organic chemistry. [8]annulyne is known to exist but quickly dimerizes or trimerizes; the compound has been trapped as its radical anion and observed by EPR spectroscopy. [10]annulyne, like [4]annulyne, only exists in theory.

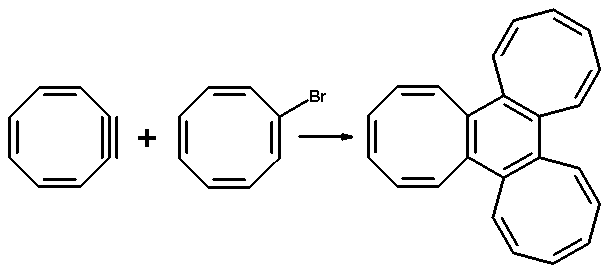
[8]Annulyne trimerization in presence of base

[12]annulyne has been observed in 2005 by Stevenson et al. in solution by NMR spectroscopy at room temperature. Reaction of 1,5-hexadiyne and potassium tert-butoxide was reported to yield two isomers 5,9-di-trans-[12]-annulyne and 3,11-di-trans-[12]annulyne in a 1:1 ratio. The proposed reaction sequence involved an unspecified electron transfer reaction. A third single isomer 3,9-di-trans-[12]annulyne could be obtained in three steps from hexabromocyclododecane.

Unlike other annulynes, the [12]annulyne isomers were found to be very stable and did not self-condense. These annulynes reacted with potassium metal to form radical anions and dianions. The NMR chemical shifts of two internal protons of the dianion were negative and attributed to an aromatic ring current. The external proton next to the triple bond had a chemical shift of nearly 14, attributed to the positive charge of the potassium cation coordinated to it.

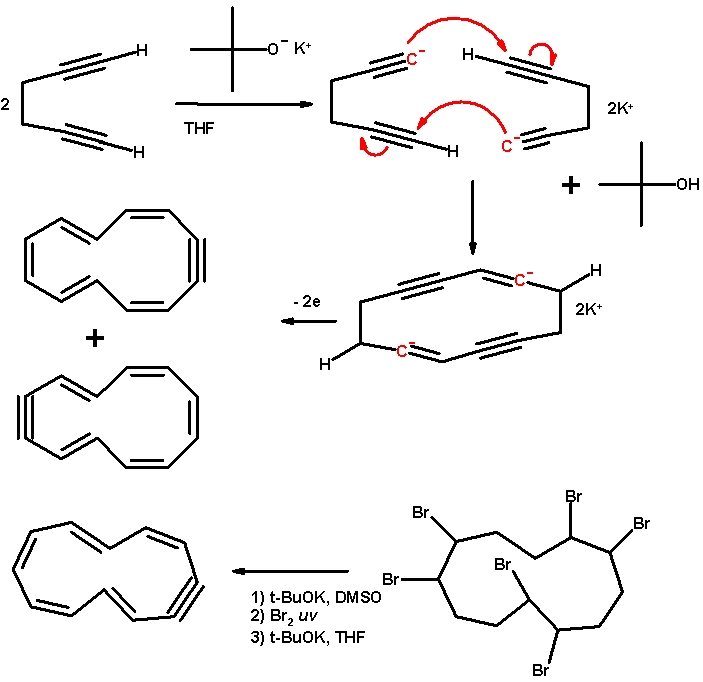
Proposed [12]Annulyne synthesis from 1,5-hexadiyne, Stevenson 2005

Two new [12]annulyne isomers were reported in 2008 by the same group.

The Stevenson findings were challenged by Christl and Hopf in 2009. They were unable to conceive a plausible mechanism and argued that based on the available spectroscopic data the products formed were in fact two linear 1,3-hexadien-5-yne isomers and not macrocycles. Computational analysis of this compound suggests valence isomerization to biphenyl is very exothermic but also with a high kinetic barrier.

[14]annulyne was reported in 1962 by Jackman et al.

== Other annulynes ==
Dehydroannulenes with more than one triple bond were pioneered by Franz Sondheimer whose research group reported bisdehydro[12]annulene in 1962 and 1,5,9-tridehydro[12]annulene in 1966. A dehydrobenzo[14]annulene was reported in 2001 by Boydston and Haley

== Applied research areas ==
Certain two-dimensional carbon networks containing a repeating dehydroannulene motif have been investigated for potential optoelectronics applications.
