= Cyclooctadecanonaene =

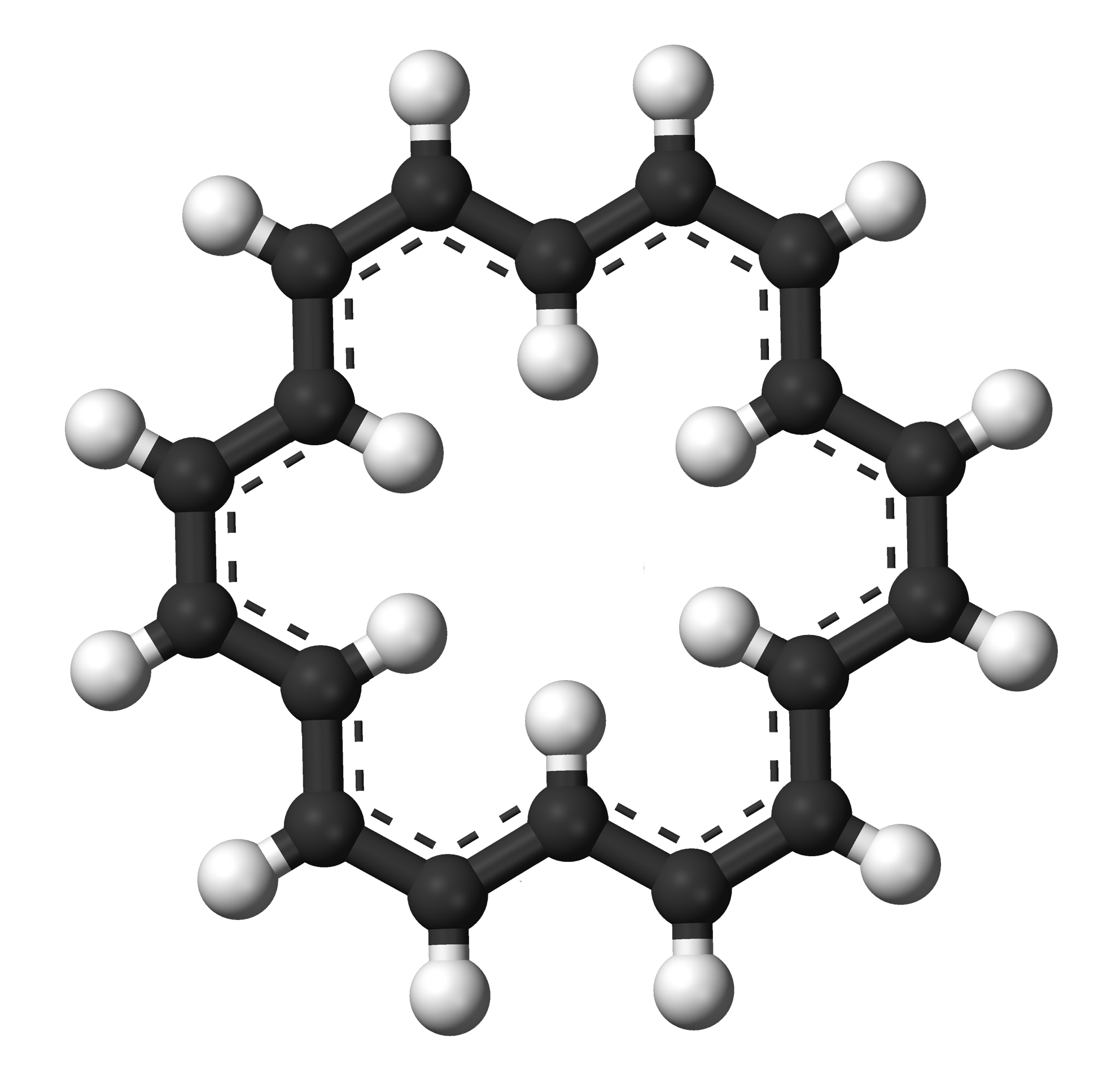

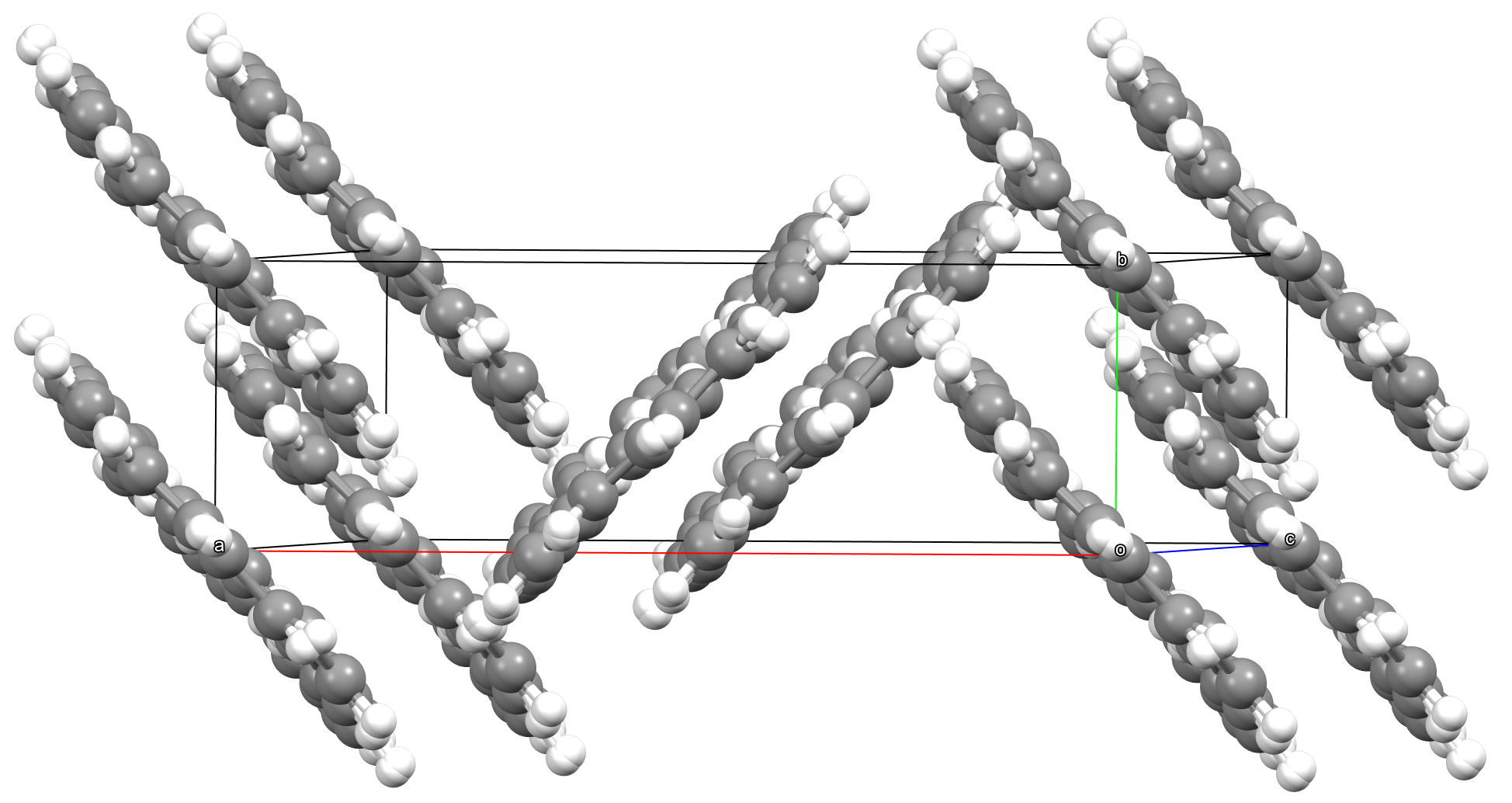
- "Herringbone" crystal structure of [18]annulene

Names
- Preferred IUPAC name (1Z,3E,5E,7Z,9E,11E,13Z,15E,17E)-Cyclooctadeca-1,3,5,7,9,11,13,15,17-nonaene

Identifiers
CAS Number	2040-73-5
3D model (JSmol)	Interactive image
ChemSpider	120988
PubChem CID	137294
UNII	W4JYP9W5EU
- InChI: InChI=1S/C18H18/c1-2-4-6-8-10-12-14-16-18-17-15-13-11-9-7-5-3-1/h1-18H/b2-1-,3-1+,4-2+,5-3+,6-4+,7-5-,8-6-,9-7+,10-8+,11-9+,12-10+,13-11-,14-12-,15-13+,16-14+,17-15+,18-16+,18-17- Key: STQWAGYDANTDNA-DWSNDWDZSA-N; InChI=1/C18H18/c1-2-4-6-8-10-12-14-16-18-17-15-13-11-9-7-5-3-1/h1-18H/b2-1-,3-1+,4-2+,5-3+,6-4+,7-5-,8-6-,9-7+,10-8+,11-9+,12-10+,13-11-,14-12-,15-13+,16-14+,17-15+,18-16+,18-17- Key: STQWAGYDANTDNA-DWSNDWDZBB
- SMILES: C1=CC=CC=CC=CC=CC=CC=CC=CC=C1

Properties
Chemical formula	C_{18}H_{18}
Molar mass	234.3 g·mol^{−1}
Appearance	red-brown crystals
Density	1.134 g/cm^{3} (calc.)

Structure
Space group	monoclinic, P2_{1}/a
Lattice constant	a = 1.4984 (5) nm, b = 0.4802(2) nm, c = 1.0260(3) nm α = 90°, β = 111.52(1)°, γ = 90°
Formula units (Z)	2
- Except where otherwise noted, data are given for materials in their standard state (at 25 °C [77 °F], 100 kPa). verify (what is ?) Infobox references

Cyclooctadecanonaene or [18]annulene is an organic compound with chemical formula C_{18}H_{18}. It belongs to the class of highly conjugated compounds known as annulenes and is aromatic. The usual isomer that [18]annulene refers to is the most stable one, containing six interior hydrogens and twelve exterior ones, with the nine formal double bonds in the cis,trans,trans,cis,trans,trans,cis,trans,trans configuration. It is reported to be a red-brown crystalline solid.

== Aromaticity ==
Notably, [18]annulene is the first annulene after benzene ([6]annulene) to be fully aromatic: its π-system contains 4n + 2 electrons (n = 4), and it is large enough to comfortably accommodate six hydrogen atoms in its interior, allowing it to adopt a planar shape, thus satisfying Hückel's rule. The discovery of aromatic stabilization for [18]annulene is historically significant for confirming earlier theoretical predictions based on molecular orbital theory, since simple versions of valence bond theory did not readily explain the 4n + 2 rule.

The ^{1}H NMR of this compound exhibits hallmarks of a system with an aromatic ring current, with the 12H signal of exterior hydrogens at 9.25 ppm, while the 6H signal of interior hydrogens resonates at a remarkable −2.9 ppm in THF-d_{8} at −60 °C. On the other hand, a single signal at 5.45 ppm (the weighted average of the two individual signals) is observed at 120 °C. This is consistent with rapid exchange of exterior and interior hydrogens at that temperature. The bond lengths in [18]annulene are in between those of single and double carbon–carbon bond, with two bond lengths observed crystallographically: 138.9 pm (concave edges) and 140.7 pm (convex edges) which are indicative of significant delocalization. The favorability of delocalization is, in turn, interpreted as evidence for aromaticity. For comparison, these values are close to bond length of benzene (140 pm).

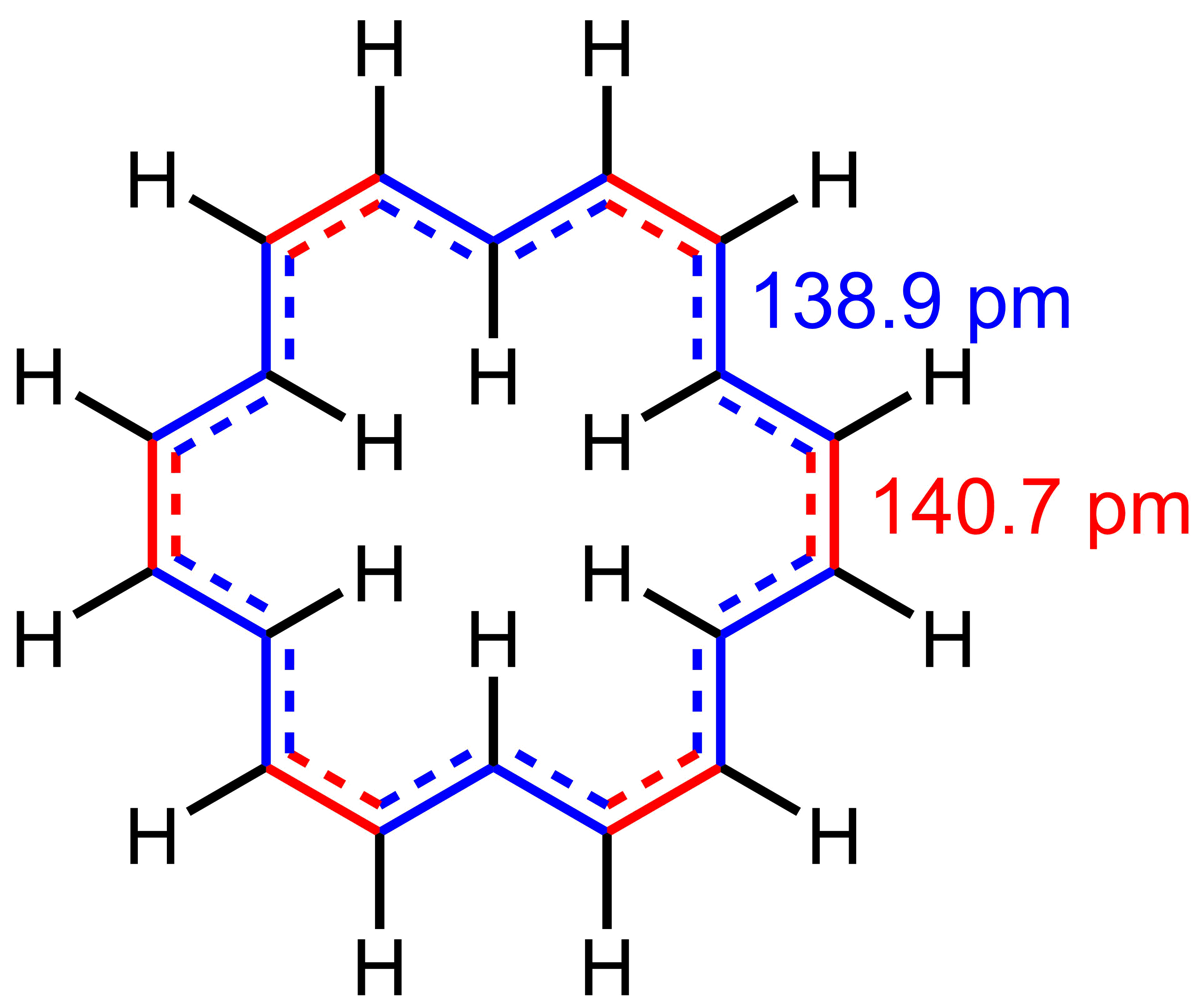
The bond lengths of [18]annulene are around 139 to 141 pm, indicating delocalization and a bond order between 1 and 2. In general, carbon-carbon single bonds and double bonds are 154 pm and 134 pm, respectively, while benzene, with a bond order of 1.5, the bond-length is 140 pm.

Based on the enthalpy of hydrogenation, the overall resonance energy has been estimated to be 37 kcal/mol. This is about the same as that of benzene; however, this energy is spread out over 18 atoms instead of 6, so [18]annulene experiences a weaker stabilization than benzene. In terms of reactivity, it is somewhat more air- and light-stable than [14]annulene and [10]annulene, which are, respectively, weakly aromatic and nonaromatic due to transannular interactions. Nevertheless, it rapidly undergoes electrophilic additions, much like other polyenes, and attempts to effect Friedel–Crafts type reactions on [18]annulene failed.

Despite the usual interpretation of [18]annulene as an 18-electron aromatic system, a 2014 theoretical study suggested that [18]annulene may be thought of as having only three completely delocalized π bonds associated with its aromaticity, while the other six π bonds represent conjugated three-center-two-electron (3c–2e) π bonds on the periphery of the molecule.

== Synthesis ==
The compound was first synthesised by Franz Sondheimer. The original synthesis (3 steps, 0.5–0.6% yield) is via the Eglinton reaction (oxidative coupling) of 1,5-hexadiyne with copper(II) acetate in pyridine to its cyclic trimer, followed by deprotonation and isomerization to conjugated cyclopolyenynes using potassium tert-butoxide in tert-butanol, concluding with the hydrogenation of remaining alkyne linkages using Lindlar catalyst. Similar synthetic approaches can be used to obtain other large-ring annulenes. In particular, tetramerization of 1,5-hexadiyne, a side-reaction, yields precursors to [24]annulene.

== See also ==
- Superbenzene
