= Cannabis in Israel =

- Location of Israel (dark green)
- Medicinal: Legal
- Recreational: Illegal

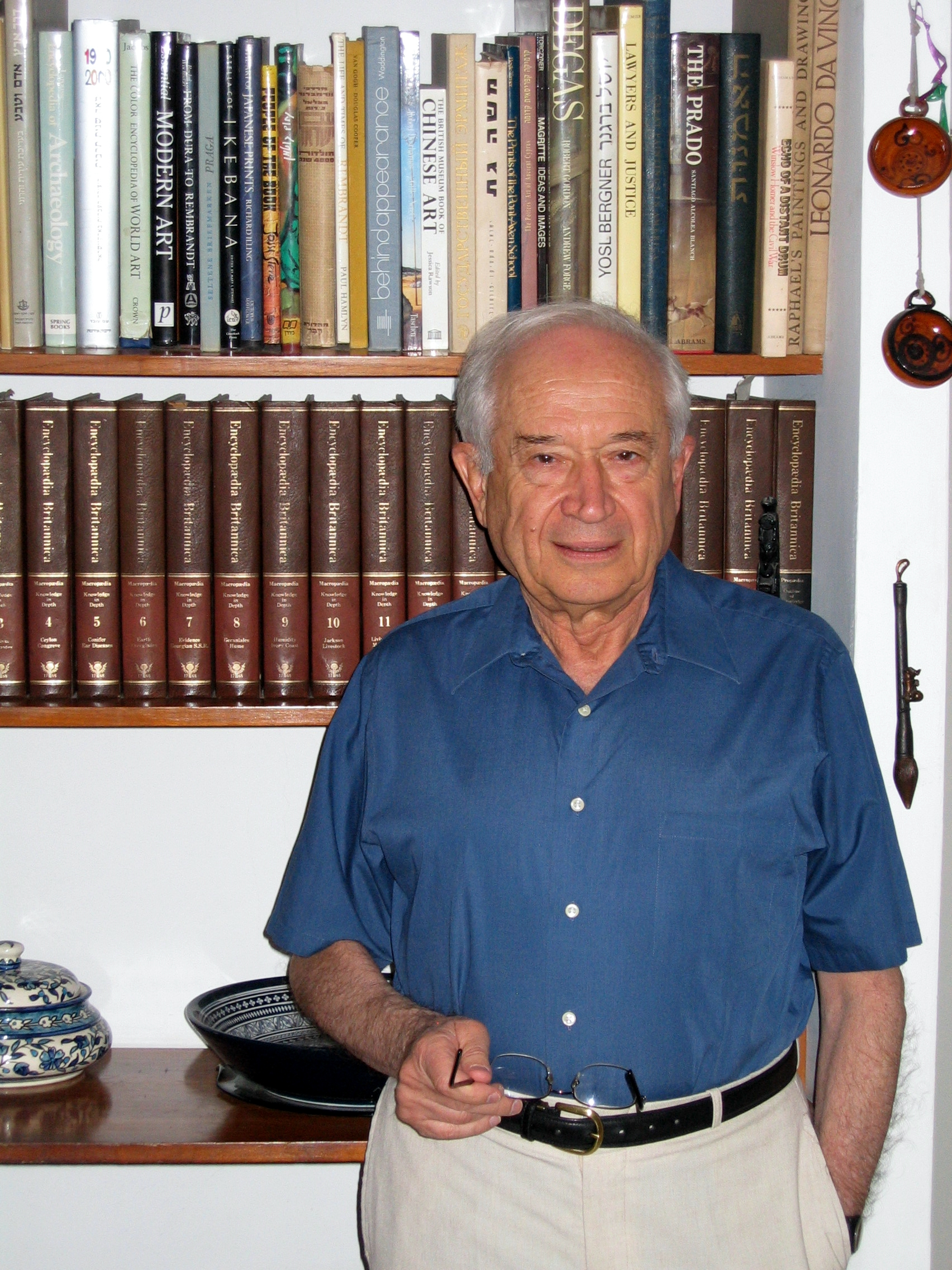
Professor Raphael Mechoulam of the Hebrew University of Jerusalem isolated THC from cannabis in 1964 (along with Yechiel Gaoni) and later discovered anandamide.

The possession, use, and distribution of cannabis without a license in the State of Israel are violations under the Dangerous Drugs Ordinance. A decade ago, despite these regulations, enforcement was relatively lax, partially influenced by a political movement advocating tolerance. Over the years, the enforcement approach has progressively become more lenient. As of 2021, cannabis use has been fully decriminalized, with it being treated as an administrative infraction primarily when used in highly visible public places. There is a possibility that cannabis may be legalized for recreational use by adults aged 21 and older in the future, with regulations akin to those for alcohol.

Public and cross-party political support for the complete decriminalization of cannabis increased in the 2010s with increasing usage for both medical and recreational purposes, and the establishment of a political party primarily devoted to this cause; on July 19, 2018, the Knesset approved a bill for decriminalization, although the supporters of recreational cannabis use insisted that this did not represent complete decriminalization. The law came into effect on April 1, 2019. On June 25, 2020, further legislation designed to decriminalize possession of up to 50 grams of cannabis began its passage through the Knesset.

Under current rules, citizens caught using cannabis in public cannot be arrested if they have no previous record of cannabis use, but may face fines of up to 1000 NIS. The money collected from these fines is used to support education and rehabilitation programs.

Israeli scientists have conducted research into the properties and medical applications of cannabis since the 1960s, with notable discoveries first made by Raphael Mechoulam and Yechiel Gaoni of the Hebrew University of Jerusalem, who isolated THC from cannabis in 1964 and later discovered anandamide, and cannabis has been legal to use for medical purposes since the 1990s.

A survey in 2017 found that 27% of Israelis between the ages of 18 and 65 had consumed cannabis in the last year, up from 8.8% in 2009, the highest rates of annual cannabis usage in the world, followed by Iceland and the US at 18% and 16% respectively.

== Medical cannabis ==
THC, the psychoactive chemical component in marijuana that causes a high, was first isolated by Israeli scientists Raphael Mechoulam of the Hebrew University in Jerusalem's Center for Research on Pain and Yechiel Gaoni of the Weizmann Institute in 1964.

Marijuana for medical use has been permitted in Israel since the early 1990s for cancer patients and those with pain-related illnesses such as Parkinson's, multiple sclerosis, Crohn's disease, other chronic pain and post-traumatic stress disorder. Patients can smoke cannabis, or ingest it sublingually via oil.

In 2004, the Israeli military began using tetrahydrocannabinol (THC), one of the active ingredients in cannabis, for experimental treatment of post traumatic stress disorder (PTSD) of soldiers.

In 2012, the number of registered patients using medical cannabis was about 10,000. There are eight government-sanctioned cannabis growing operations in Israel, which distribute it for medical purposes to patients who have a license from the Ministry of Health and a prescription from an authorized doctor, via either a company's store, or in a medical center.

The Tikkun Olam Company has developed a variety of cannabis strains and marijuana-derived products that are reported to provide medical benefits. These products contain different levels of CBD and THC for optimum efficacy, depending on the medical condition they are taken for. CBD is the Cannabis substance that is believed to be an anti-inflammatory ingredient, which helps alleviate pain. THC in low levels does not cause a "high". Tikun Olam has now developed a range of 230 different varieties and is considered one of the leading medical cannabis suppliers in the world, while the Israeli-American company Cannabics Pharmaceuticals is aiming to put the medicinal compounds of cannabis into a sustained-release capsule in standardized doses.

In 2017, it was reported that the Israeli medical cannabis industry could soon be worth "hundreds of millions of dollars", with research innovation in the area being backed by Israel's Ministry of Health. Currently there are about 26,000 registered medical cannabis users, with the number expected to double by 2018.

=== Import ===
The importation of medical cannabis to Israel has become increasingly important as the country's medical cannabis program and market size continues to grow. Since January 2020 Israel allows for the importation of medical cannabis products from countries that have a similar regulatory framework to Israel. In 2022 Israel imported more than 33,000 kg of medical cannabis, in comparison to a total of 22,000 kg in 2021, mainly from Canada, Portugal, South Africa and Lesotho, making Israel the largest importer of medical cannabis products in the world. The Israeli Ministry of Health oversees all imports, ensuring that all products meet Israeli health regulations. In second half of 2022 new importing regulations were introduced by the Ministry, a procedure 109, is a set of guidelines for the process of approving applications for the import of a dangerous drug of the cannabis type for medical use and research.

=== Export ===
In April 2017, with global demand growing, Israel gave medical cannabis companies the green light to start exporting their products, with analyses estimating that the measure could generate Israel some $267 million per year. It was reported that formal legislation was coming but could take months to complete.

An inter-ministerial report said in August 2017 that exports could add four billion shekels to the Israeli economy.

Israel is considered to have a climate that is especially good for producing cannabis, with the "perfect level of humidity", according to Tamir Gedo, the head of BOL Pharma, one of the companies authorized to grow and distribute medical cannabis.

=== Research and Innovation ===
Israel is considered a global leader in medical cannabis research and innovation. Research and innovation in the area is supported by the Ministry of Health and currently being dedicated 8 million shekels a year, making Israel one of three countries in the world where cannabis research is sponsored by the government. Cannabis researchers have relocated to Israel to pursue their studies, including entire firms which do their cannabis research in Israel to evade onerous regulations on cannabis research in the US, where it is "easier to research heroin than cannabis". At least 15 US companies have moved their entire R&D operations onto Israeli soil.

Israel's government-sponsored Breath of Life company plans to apply for FDA status for its new cannabinoid pills designed for treatment of autism.

According to iCan, an Israeli company which invests in the local cannabis market and shmeitahs, more than 50 U.S. companies are doing cannabis research in Israel, and in 2016 they invested more than $125 million in Israeli cannabis operations.

== Military use ==
Cannabis use is prohibited in the Israel Defense Forces (IDF). The IDF conducts random and non-random drug testing on members. In December, 2016, penalties for use by off-duty soldiers were relaxed; use would no longer automatically result in a court-martial.

Since 2014, IDF members in reserve status are authorized to use medical cannabis. Some soldiers have received prescriptions for cannabis to treat post-traumatic stress disorder (PTSD), with "the authorization and support of the Health Ministry and the Ministry of Defense".

== Legality ==
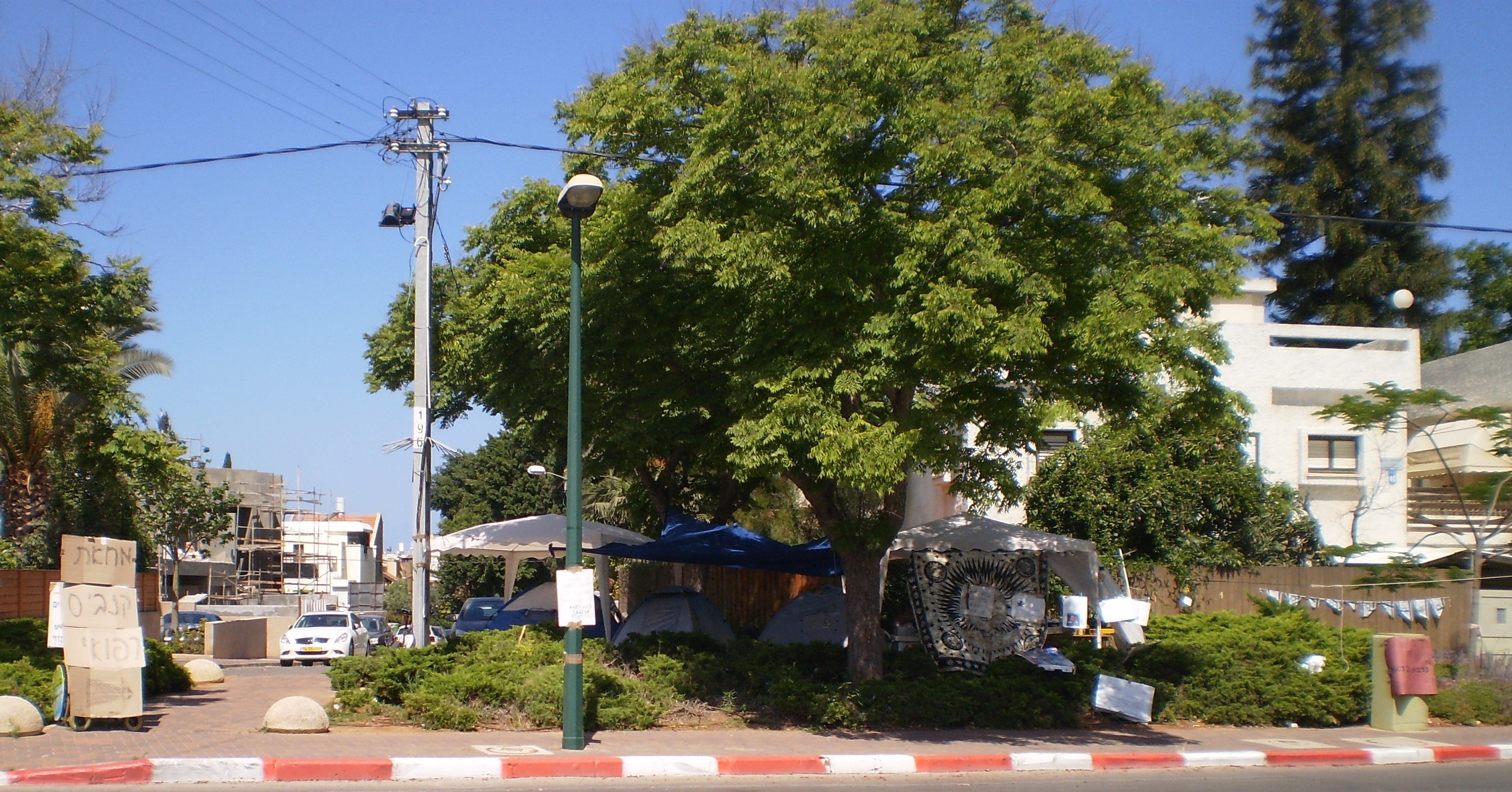
Pro-legalization protest in Israel

Before 6 March 2017, cannabis for recreational purposes was illegal and those charged with public cannabis usage could have faced heavy fines or incarceration, although it was reported that in 2015 the number of arrests for this was under 200; The New York Times noted that cannabis usage had long been overlooked by law enforcement in Israel, but that there was notable enforcement against growers and dealers.

As of 2015, most Israeli political parties favored legalizing marijuana for medicinal purposes. Parties represented in the Knesset that supported the legalization of medical marijuana in 2015 include the Zionist Union, the Joint List, Meretz, and Kulanu. The latter two supported decriminalization of the drug altogether. The Green Leaf Party, which had made cannabis legalization its raison d'être, has thus far never won a Knesset seat.

In 2017, the conservative government of Benjamin Netanyahu, led by Likud and consisting of various right-wing, religious and Sefardi-interest parties planned to decriminalize cannabis usage. Despite acute tension at the time between left- and the right-wing parties, the initiative was supported in the Knesset by parties across the political spectrum; right-wing Justice Minister Ayelet Shaked remarked that "whether one supports the use of cannabis or is opposed, it is wrong to judge cannabis users per criminal law and its derivatives", while left-wing Meretz member Tamar Zandberg also applauded the decision, calling it a "message that millions of Israelis who consume cannabis are not criminals" and "an important step but not the end of the road", while Public Security Minister Gilad Erdan said it marked a change in policy toward a rehabilitation-oriented approach.

Cannabis usage remains illegal and those found using it in public could face fines or, after the fourth offense, incarceration; offenses before the fourth result in fines used for education and rehabilitation efforts and do not result in criminal records; the third offense results in mandatory participation in rehabilitation programs. Enforcement appears to be lax unless cannabis consumption occurs in public, high-visibility places. Israel's liberal stance on cannabis stands in contrast to the rest of the Middle East region where in some countries "drug trafficking" is punishable with death.

In April 2017, it was reported that Israel's government was considering further liberalization of laws concerning recreational usage. In November 2017, it was reported that Israeli Ministry of Health considering to withdraw its objection to making CBD component of cannabis legal.

On April 20, 2018, Israeli pharmacies were legally permitted to begin selling cannabis oil under a pilot program.

As of April 1, 2019, Israel decriminalized the use of cannabis for citizens over the age of 18 when used in private. Possession of a home-grown marijuana plant and buds are no longer a punishable offence. Adults caught in public with small amounts of cannabis are subject to a fine of approximately $275 for the first offence, and $550 if caught a second time. A third offence within seven years will open a criminal investigation. Decriminalization does not apply to soldiers, minors, or those with criminal records. However, otherwise law-abiding minors will be directed to rehabilitation programs. Activists lobbying for complete legalization do not support the new legislation, stating that the new law could promote stricter enforcement of the fines, whereas the police were hesitant to open criminal investigations on such large numbers of otherwise law-abiding citizens.

== Halakhic status ==
In 2013, Hagai Bar Giora, an Israeli rabbi and member of the Kashrut Department, stated in an interview with Israel's Cannabis magazine that "if you smoke it, there is no problem whatsoever." Bar Giora noted that hempseed, being a legume, is not kosher for Passover for Ashkenazi Jews, but is for Sefardic Jews who permit eating legumes on Passover. However, Orthodox rabbi Moshe Feinstein stated that cannabis was not permitted under Jewish law, due to its harmful effects. In 2013, Orthodox rabbi Efraim Zalmanovich stated that medical, but not recreational, cannabis is permitted.
