= Clare Hodges =

British activist (1957–2011)

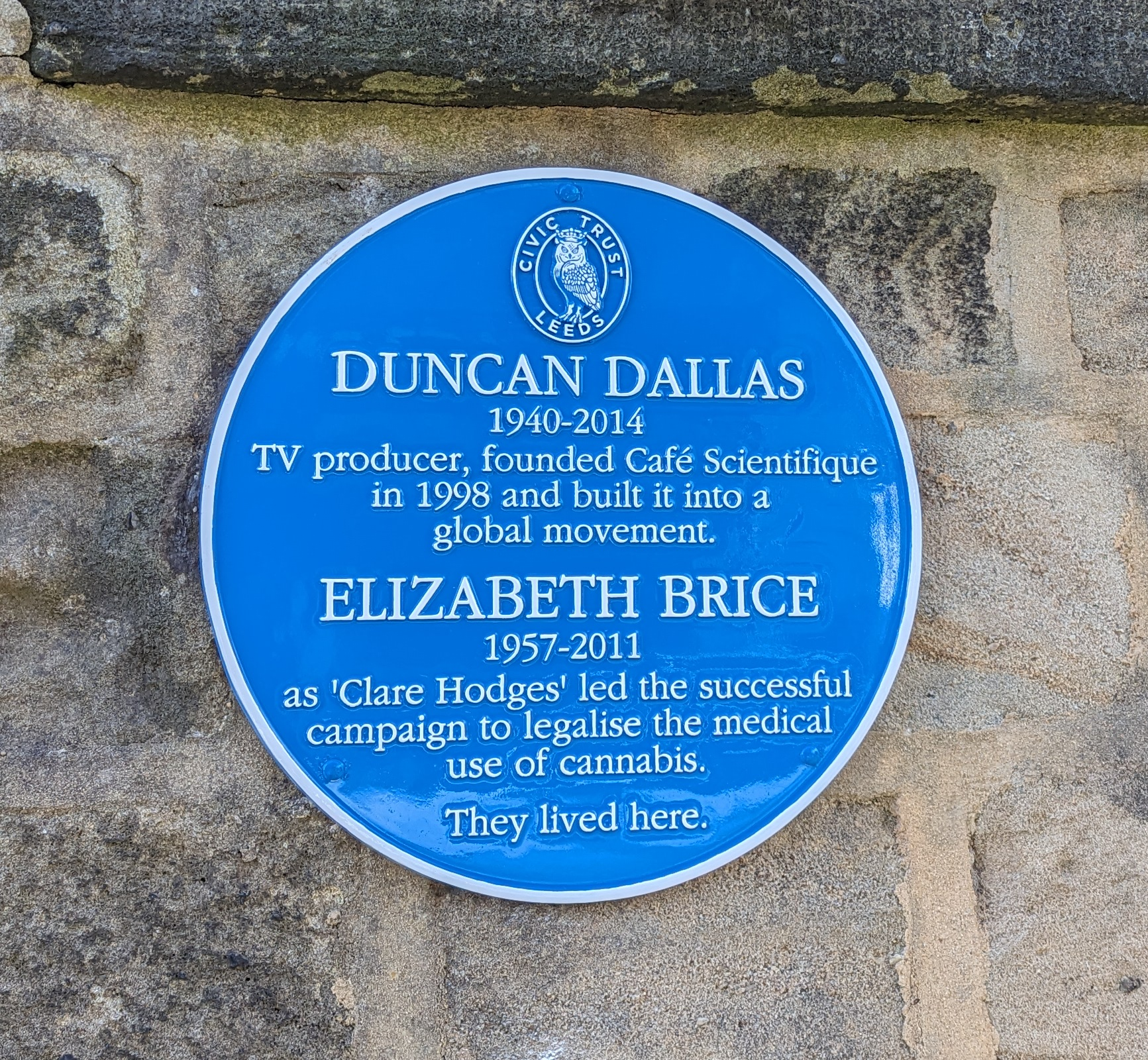
Blue Plaque celebrating Elizabeth Brice & Duncan Dallas

Clare Hodges (6 July 1957 – 23 August 2011), also known as Elizabeth Brice, was an English activist who advanced the medical understanding of cannabis and campaigned for its widespread benefit as a therapeutic medicine in the United Kingdom. Clare Hodges is the pseudonym that Elizabeth Brice used, Clare being her middle name and Hodges her mother's maiden name.

She was diagnosed with multiple sclerosis (MS) at age 26 but it was nearly 10 years before she tried cannabis to alleviate the symptoms. Hodges found that cannabis greatly alleviated her condition. It was this that motivated her to become an avid cannabis rights campaigner.

Consequently, Hodges founded the Alliance for Cannabis Therapeutics (ACT) in 1992 with two other patients. The ACT worked to provide advice and assistance to other individuals with MS or other medical conditions which might benefit from the use of cannabis.

Hodges took the matter to the House of Lords in 1998 where she spoke about the benefits she had found from the therapeutic use of this illicit drug. She stated "Cannabis helps my body relax. I function and move much easier. The physical effects are very clear. It is not just a vague feeling of well-being".

Despite the backing of several members of the House of Lords, and Austin Mitchell MP, the ACT was unable to change the law in the UK with regard to the use of cannabis. Hodges later went on to join the board of directors of the International Association for Cannabinoid Medicines (IACM) as a patient representative from 2001 until her death in 2011.

Nonetheless, Hodges worked with Dr William Notcutt to ensure GW Pharmaceuticals took up the issue and as a result Sativex is now available as an alternative.

She also addressed the European Parliament in Brussels following which the law was changed in Belgium.

Due to deteriorating health as a result of her MS, Hodges handed over the articles and patient transcripts to the Wellcome Trust in 2009.

On 17 April 2024, a blue plaque was unveiled in Chapel Allerton, commemorating the lives of both Hodges and her husband.

== Personal life ==
Hodges was born in Manchester. She studied Latin and Greek at Somerville College, Oxford. She then went on to pursue a career in medical journalism, first writing for a newspaper for doctors before becoming a producer at Yorkshire Television working on a number of medical documentaries, including several with Dr Miriam Stoppard.

Hodges was married to Duncan Dallas, founder of Café Scientifique, and has two sons.
