= Raphael Mechoulam =

Israeli chemist (1930–2023)

- רפאל משולם
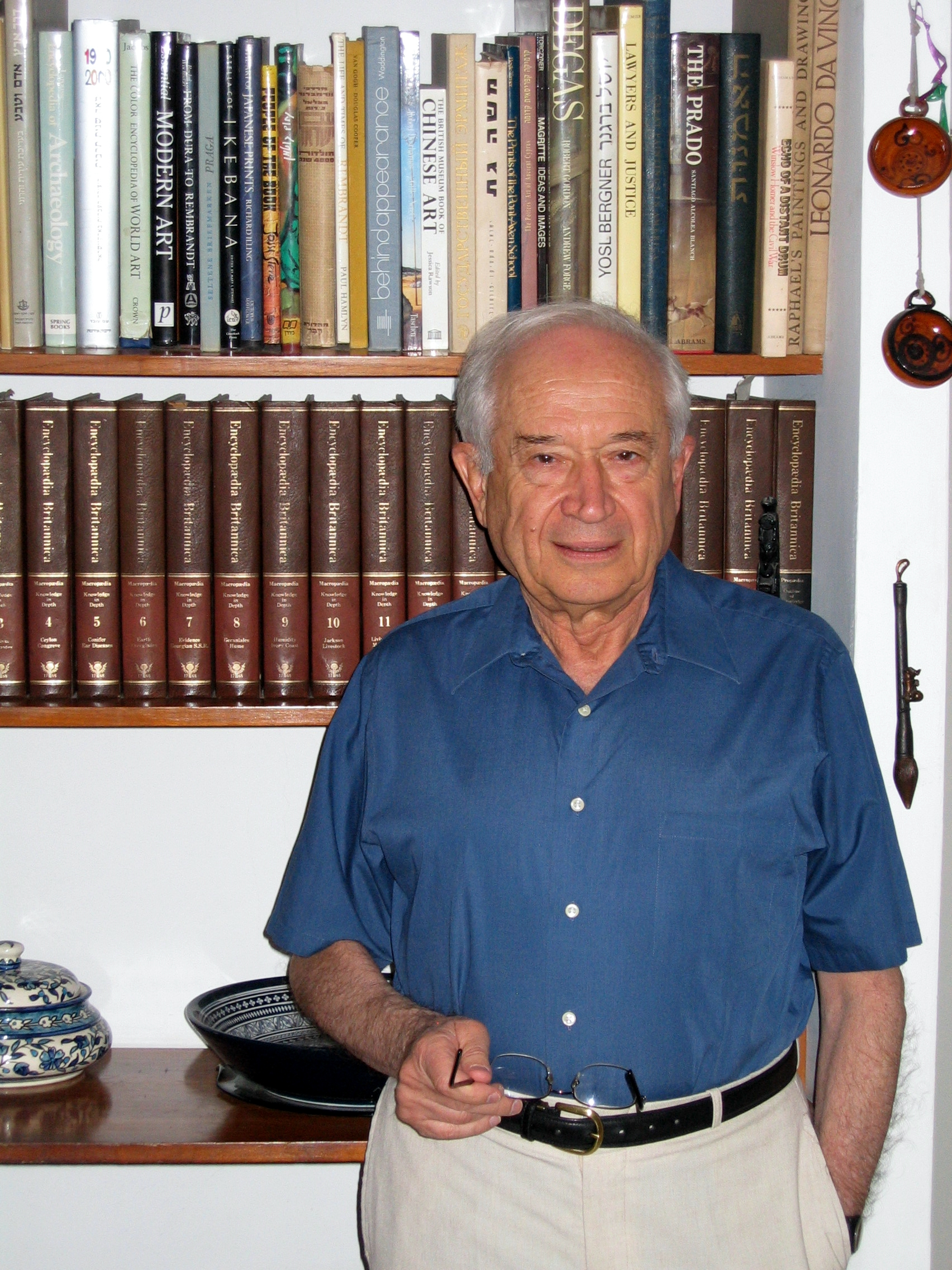
- Born: 5 November 1930; Sofia, Bulgaria
- Died: 9 March 2023 (aged 92); Jerusalem
- Citizenship: Israel
- Known for: Total synthesis of tetrahydrocannabinol, major contributions to the chemistry of cannabinoids and discovery of endocannabinoids
- Awards: Harvey Prize (2019) Israel Prize (2000); EMET Prize (2012); Rothschild Prize (2012); Heinrich Wieland Prize (2004) NIDA Discovery Award (2011)
- Scientific career
- Fields: Medicinal Chemistry, Natural Products
- Workplaces: Weizmann Institute of Science, Rockefeller University, Hebrew University of Jerusalem
- Doctoral advisor: Prof. Franz Sondheimer

Raphael Mechoulam (Note: Hebrew: רפאל משולם, Bulgarian: Рафаел Мешулам) (Hebrew: רפאל משולם; 5 November 1930 – 9 March 2023) was a Bulgarian-born Israeli organic chemist and a professor in the Department of Natural Materials at the School of Pharmacy in the Faculty of Medicine of the Hebrew University of Jerusalem. Mechoulam served as Rector of the university from 1979–1982. He was elected to the Israel Academy of Sciences and Humanities in 1994 and served as its scientific chair from 2007–2013. He was a recipient of the Israel Prize for Chemistry Research in 2000 and the Harvey Prize for 2019–2020.

Known as "the godfather of cannabis research", Mechoulam is best known for his work (together with Y. Gaoni) in the isolation of tetrahydrocannabinol, or THC, the main active principle of cannabis. He was also successful in the isolation and identification of the endogenous cannabinoids anandamide from the brain and 2-arachidonoyl glycerol, or 2-AG, from peripheral organs. His work has led to the discovery of the endocannabinoid system, which has effects on many important aspects of human health.

== Biography ==
Mechoulam was born in Sofia, Bulgaria on 5 November 1930, to a Sephardic Jewish family. Both parents were well-educated: his father was a physician and head of a local hospital and his mother had studied in Berlin. He attended an "American grade school" in Sofia until the enactment of antisemitic laws and the beginning of World War II. The school was closed. Mechoulam's parents left Sofia, removing to a small village in the Balkans, where they hoped they would be safer. In spite of being the only doctor in the area, Mechoulam's father was subsequently sent to a concentration camp, which he survived. After the communist takeover of hitherto pro-German Bulgaria in 1944 he studied chemical engineering, which he "disliked."

In 1949 his family immigrated to Israel where he later studied chemistry. Mechoulam received his M.Sc. in biochemistry from the Hebrew University of Jerusalem in 1952. During his military service in the Israeli Army from 1953 to 1956, he conducted research on insecticides.

In the years 1956–1958, Mechoulam did his doctorate at the Weizmann Institute of Science, and was one of the first to be awarded a doctorate by the Weizmann Institute. The topic of his doctoral thesis was the synthesis of steroids and it was conducted under the guidance of Franz Sondheimer. From 1959 to 1960, he did a post-doctorate at the Rockefeller Institute in New York in research on the structure of terpenes. From 1960 to 1965, he worked as a researcher at the Weizmann Institute, and studied the chemistry of natural substances, including cannabinoids, terpenes, and alkaloids.

In 1966, Mechoulam joined the faculty of the Hebrew University in Jerusalem. In 1967, he received a research grant from the Institute of Mental Health in the United States to continue his research on hashish. In 1968, he was appointed an associate professor, and in 1972, a full professor, at Hebrew University. In 1975 he was appointed to the Lionel Jacobson chair for medicinal chemistry.

From 1979 to 1982, Mechoulam served as rector of the Hebrew University, and from 1983 to 1985 as pro-rector. In 1982, he was a visiting professor at Ohio University, and in 1993–1994 he was a visiting professor in the Department of Pharmacology at the Richmond College of Medicine. In 1994, he was elected a member of the Israel Academy of Sciences and Humanities.

Mechoulam was a founding member of the International Association for Cannabinoid Medicines (IACM) and the International Cannabinoid Research Society. He served as president of the International Cannabinoid Research Society from (1999–2002) and Chairman of the Board of the International Association for Cannabinoid Medicines (2003–2005). From 2007 to 2018, he served as the chairman of the Natural Sciences Division at the Israel National Academy of Sciences. The documentary The Scientist: Are We Missing Something? details the life and career of Mechoulam from his early life in Bulgaria through to his career with cannabis. It premiered at the Virginia Film Festival in November 2015.

Mechoulam died on 9 March 2023, at the age of 92.

== Research ==
Raphael Mechoulam's major scientific interest was the chemistry and pharmacology of cannabinoids. In 1963 Mechoulam began working on the components of the cannabis plant, from which hashish and marijuana are produced. Although cannabis had been the most widely used illegal drug in many parts of the world for centuries, its chemistry and biology were unknown, in contrast to morphine and cocaine, the two other common illegal drugs, which had been isolated as early as the 19th century. While some research had been done, the psychoactive components of cannabis had not been isolated in their pure form, and their chemical structure had not been explained.

With other members of his research group including Yehiel Gaoni, Mechoulam elaborated the structures and stereochemistry of the major plant cannabinoids cannabidiol (CBD, 1963) and Δ^{9}-tetrahydrocannabinol (THC, 1964) and succeeded in their total synthesis in 1965. They also isolated, characterized and synthesized cannabigerol (CBG, 1964), and showed that it was not psychoactive. In 1970, Mechoulam's doctoral student Zvi Ben-Zvi reported the first isolation of an active THC metabolite in the human body.

During the 1980s, Mechoulam continued to study the active structure of the cannabinoids and began to work with clinicians on clinical trials with THC and CBD in animal models. In 1987, Mechoulam and A. Abrahamov initiated a clinical trial with Δ8-THC (a more stable isomer of Δ9-THC) in children who were undergoing chemotherapy treatments against cancer. The substance prevented nausea and vomiting and has since been used clinically against nausea and vomiting in chemotherapy patients.

In 1989, Mechoulam established the concept that THC-style activity depends on a three-dimensional stereospecific structure. This distinction is one of the factors that has led to the discovery (by other groups) of a specific cannabinoid receptor known as CB1.

Mechoulam initiated a research project that led to the isolation of the first described endocannabinoid anandamide (N-arachidonoyl-ethanolamine, AEA) in 1992. Anandamide, which is a fatty acid derivative, differs in its structure from the plant cannabinoid, and has the same activity profile as THC. It was isolated and characterized by postdoctoral researchers William Devane and Lumír Ondřej Hanuš. Another endogenous cannabinoid, 2-arachidonoylglycerol (2-AG), was discovered in 1995 by Shimon Ben-Shabat, one of his PhD students. In 2006, Mechoulam's group identified another endocannabinoid, arachidonoyl L-serine. It is not related to the known cannabinoid receptors, but is probably an endogenous ligand of a novel cannabinoid receptor, which causes vasodilation.

In 1998, Mechoulam and Ben-Shabat posited the “entourage effect”, the idea that a variety of metabolites working together can result in increased activity compared to individual endogenous cannabinoids.

The endocannabinoid system is a relatively newly discovered neurotransmission system, which influences a variety of functions and systems in the human body. The discovery of the endocannabinoid system and the study of its functions in the body has helped to open a new field in biochemistry and brain research. The research in Mechoulam's laboratory, in collaboration with other groups in Israel and abroad, has helped to clarify the importance of the plant's cannabinoids and endocannabinoids in many physiological processes and has furthered research into their possible use in the treatment of pathological conditions.

Mechoulam published more than 425 scientific articles. He is listed as a co-founder of the company 180 life sciences. In 2020, he appeared in the documentary CBD Nation, discussing the medical value of cannabis.

== Honours and awards ==
- 2019–2020: Harvey Prize of the Technion
- 2019: Doctor of Philosophy, Honoris causa, Weizmann Institute of Science
- 2014: IACM Special Award, International Association for Cannabinoid Medicines (IACM)
- 2012: Rothschild Prize in Chemical Sciences and Physical Sciences,
- 2012: EMET Prize in Exact Sciences—Chemistry
- 2011: NIDA Discovery Award
- 2006: ECNP Lifetime Achievement Award in Neuropsychopharmacology
- 2006: Degree Honoris causa, Complutense University of Madrid
- 2003–2005: Chairman of the Board, International Association for Cannabinoid Medicines (IACM)
- 2002: Honorary Member of the Israel Society for Physiology and Pharmacology
- 2001: Honorary doctorate from Ohio State University
- 2000: Israel Prize in Exact Sciences - Chemistry
- 1999–2002: President, International Cannabinoid Research Society (ICRS)
- 1994: Member of the Israel Academy of Sciences and Humanities

== See also ==
- Cannabis in Israel
