= Annulene =

Completely conjugated monocyclic hydrocarbons

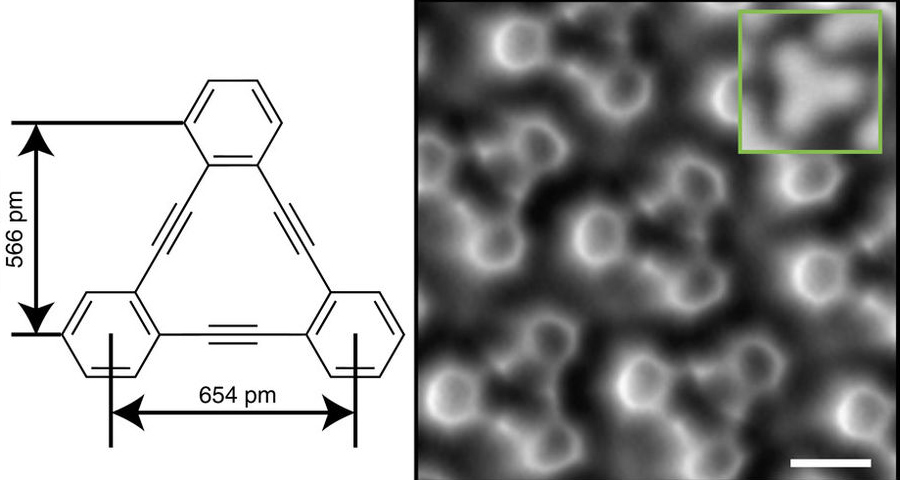
Structure and AFM image of a hexadehydrotribenzo[12]annulene

Annulenes are monocyclic hydrocarbons that contain the maximum number of non-cumulated or conjugated double bonds ('mancude'), and their derivatives. They have the general formula C_{n}H_{n} (when n is an even number) or C_{n}H_{n+1} (when n is an odd number). The IUPAC accepts the use of 'annulene nomenclature' in naming carbocyclic ring systems with 7 or more carbon atoms, using the name '[n]annulene' for the mancude hydrocarbon with n carbon atoms in its ring, though in certain contexts (e.g., discussions of aromaticity for different ring sizes), smaller rings (n = 3 to 6) can also be informally referred to as annulenes. Using this form of nomenclature 1,3,5,7-cyclooctatetraene is [8]annulene and benzene is [6]annulene (and occasionally referred to as just 'annulene').

The discovery that [18]annulene possesses a number of key properties associated with other aromatic molecules was an important development in the understanding of aromaticity as a chemical concept.

In the related annulynes, one double bond is replaced by a triple bond.

== Aromaticity ==
Aromaticity of the even annulenes
n	aromaticity
4	antiaromatic
6	aromatic
8	nonaromatic
10	nonaromatic
12	weakly antiaromatic
14	weakly aromatic
16	nonaromatic
18	aromatic

Annulenes may be aromatic ([6]annulene (benzene) and [18]annulene), non-aromatic ([8] and [10]annulene), or anti-aromatic (cyclobutadiene, [4]annulene). Cyclobutadiene is the only annulene with considerable antiaromaticity, since planarity is unavoidable. With [8]annulene, the molecule takes on a tub shape that allows it to avoid conjugation of double bonds. [10]Annulene is of the wrong size to achieve a planar structure: in a planar conformation, ring strain due to either steric hindrance of internal hydrogens (when some double bonds are trans) or bond angle distortion (when the double bonds are all cis) is unavoidable. Thus, it does not exhibit appreciable aromaticity.

When the annulene is large enough, [18]annulene for example, there is enough room internally to accommodate hydrogen atoms without significant distortion of bond angles. [18]Annulene possesses several properties that qualify it as aromatic. However, none of the larger annulenes are as stable as benzene, as their reactivity more closely resembles a conjugated polyene than an aromatic hydrocarbon.

In general, charged annulene species of the form [C_{4n+2+q}H_{4n+2+q}]^{q} (n = 0, 1, 2, ...; q = 0, ±1, ±2; 4n + 2 + q ≥ 3) are aromatic, provided a planar conformation can be achieved. For instance, C_{5}H^{−}_{5}, C_{3}H^{+}_{3}, and C_{8}H^{2−}_{8} are all known aromatic species.

== Gallery ==
Cyclobutadiene ([4]annulene)

Benzene ([6]annulene)

Cyclooctatetraene ([8]annulene)

Cyclodecapentaene ([10]annulene)

Cyclododecahexaene ([12]annulene)

Cyclotetradecaheptaene ([14]annulene)

Cyclooctadecanonaene ([18]annulene)

Cyclodocosahendecaene ([22]annulene)

== See also ==
- Annulyne
- Circulene
- Fulvenes
