= Cannabis Science =

U.S. biotech company

Cannabis Science Inc.
- Type: Private
- Industry: Pharmaceutical
- Founded: 2000 (as National Healthcare Technology), reestablished in 2009
- Headquarters: Irvine, California, U.S.
- Key people: Raymond C. Dabney (President, CEO, Co-Founder and Director); Robert Melamede (Co-Founder)
- Products: Pharmaceutical products
- Website: cannabisscience.com

Cannabis Science, Inc. is a biotech company based in Irvine, California. The company was incorporated in 2009 and formerly traded under the ticker CBIS on the Over-The-Counter Bulletin Board until October 2019, when their SEC license was revoked.

The company's stated goal was to obtain Food and Drug Administration (FDA) approval for cannabis-based medicines, with a focus on treating skin cancer (basal and squamous cell carcinomas), posttraumatic stress disorder and HIV. The FDA has not approved these treatments.
