= Alliance for Cannabis Therapeutics =

U.S. organization

Alliance for Cannabis Therapeutics (ACT)
- Formation: 1981
- Purpose: Medical Marijuana Legalization
- Leader: Robert C. Randall

The Alliance for Cannabis Therapeutics (ACT) is an organization supporting medical marijuana that was founded in 1981 by Robert C. Randall and Alice O'Leary. The Alliance was originally formed through Randall’s personal campaigning to access medical marijuana to treat his glaucoma. After being found not guilty of marijuana possession by reason of medical necessity and being included in a research program in which he received marijuana, Randall was the first person known to have successfully used medical necessity as a defense against a charge of marijuana possession in violation of the Controlled Substances Act. After Randall’s individual success in obtaining marijuana legally, the Alliance for Cannabis Therapeutics sought to drive the movement in politics and public media for widespread medical cannabis usage.

== History ==
The Alliance for Cannabis Therapeutics was started in 1981 by Randall and his wife, Alice O'Leary-Randall. The ACT's goal was to establish federal access to marijuana for individuals with serious and/or life-threatening conditions, a polarizing issue at the time. After extensive research and lobbying efforts, bill H.R. 4498 was introduced in the House of Representatives in September 1981. Despite being sponsored and cosponsored by 85 House Republicans, the scheduled hearings were never held. Committee Chairman Henry Waxman, a Democrat from California, never formally held hearings in part due to his own agenda of establishing heroin as a federally regulated therapeutic agent, and he worried that the ACT bill would undermine the cause. ACT continued to publicly advocate for medical usage efforts in the United States despite this setback.

Elizabeth Brice founded the UK Alliance for Cannabis Therapeutics (ACT) after contacting Alice O'Leary and Robert Randall in 1992 about the medical benefits of marijuana for individuals suffering from multiple sclerosis. Using the pseudonym Clare Hodges, Brice wrote extensively about her cannabis usage and the positive effects on her mental and physical health dealing with MS. Like Randall, Brice claimed that medicinal usage of cannabis drastically improved her life and enabled her to perform everyday tasks otherwise extremely difficult while living with MS. Randall, Brice, and O’Leary applied political pressure on the UK government through this organization. The renewed ACT focused heavily on lobbying efforts to move cannabis from a Schedule I to a Schedule II drug, in order to restore cannabis's status as a legal medicine.

Randall and O'Leary were still active in proposing medicinal cannabis usage in the US before the UK chapter of the ACT was formed. The group participated in the 1986 hearings on cannabis rescheduling in the United States. ACT along with NORML petitioned for review of the final order of the Administrator of the Drug Enforcement Administration which followed the hearings (see Alliance for Cannabis Therapeutics v. DEA, 930 F.2d 936 [D.C.Cir.1991]) The ACT during this time period became very involved in the British Medical Association Report, leading delegations of notable figures such as Professor Patrick Wall and Lord Whaddon to confer with the British Ministry of Health. Following the director of GW Pharmaceuticals joining the lobby delegation in 1997, the pharmaceutical company was granted access by British Department of Health Minister Paul Boateng to grow cannabis for medical research. Other offshoot organizations relating to medical marijuana grew out of the ACT, such as the Marijuana AIDS Research Service in the 1990s designed by Randall to help AIDS patients receive medicinal cannabis through various FDA programs.

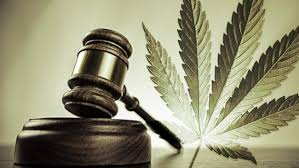

== Recognition ==
The ACT is now widely recognized as one of the most influential groups in the promotion of medicinal and recreational cannabis, both in the US and UK. In the UK, cannabis was rescheduled from a Schedule I to a Schedule II substance in November 2018, with cannabis possession currently legal for those with clinical need. As of 2024, medicinal cannabis is legal in 38 US states, with recreational use legal in 24 states. Despite Randall and Brice both dying before the public legalisation of medicinal cannabis, their contribution to the movement through the ACT was extremely influential in promoting medicinal cannabis usage.
