= Cyclotetradecaheptaene =

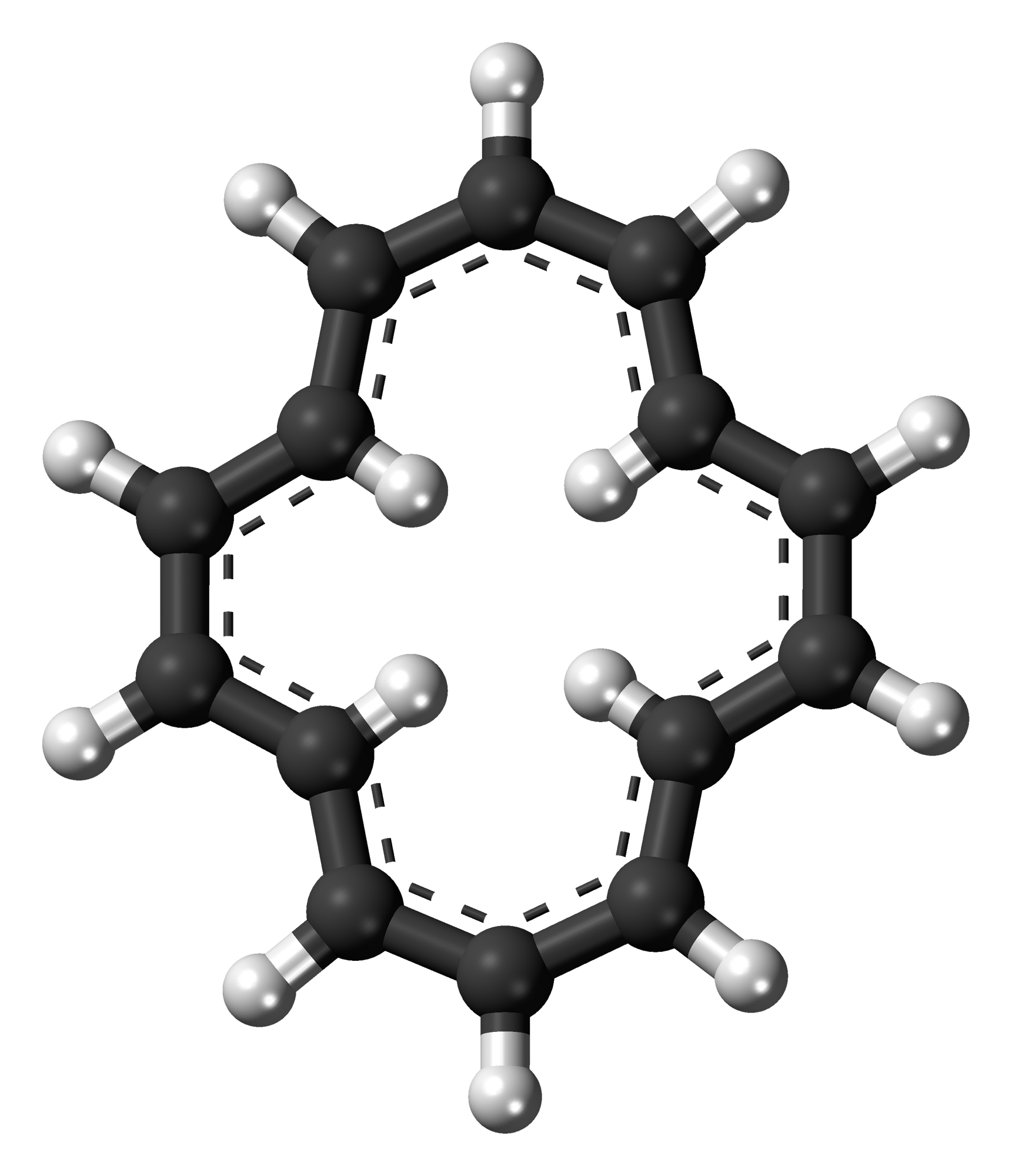

Names
- IUPAC name (1E,3Z,5E,7Z,9E,11E,13Z)-cyclotetradeca-1,3,5,7,9,11,13-heptaene
- Other names [14]Annulene

Identifiers
CAS Number	2873-14-5
3D model (JSmol)	Interactive image
ChEBI	CHEBI:37523
ChemSpider	10160742
PubChem CID	11988275
CompTox Dashboard (EPA)	DTXSID20475276
- InChI: InChI=1S/C14H14/c1-2-4-6-8-10-12-14-13-11-9-7-5-3-1/h1-14H/b2-1-,3-1-,4-2+,5-3+,6-4+,7-5+,8-6-,9-7-,10-8+,11-9+,12-10+,13-11+,14-12-,14-13- Key: RYQWRHUSMUEYST-ILUIUFOYSA-N
- SMILES: C1C=CC=CC=CC=CC=CC=CC=1

Properties
Chemical formula	C_{14}H_{14}
Molar mass	182.266 g·mol^{−1}
Appearance	dark-red needle-like crytals
Solubility in water	Insoluble
Solubility in benzene	Soluble

Structure
Crystal structure	monoclinic
Space group	P2_{1}/c, No. 14
Lattice constant	a = 8.640 Å, b = 4.376 Å, c = 14.997 Å α = 90°, β = 106°, γ = 90°
Formula units (Z)	2 molecules per cell

Hazards
- Occupational safety and health (OHS/OSH)
Main hazards	Flammable, reactive
- Except where otherwise noted, data are given for materials in their standard state (at 25 °C [77 °F], 100 kPa). verify (what is ?) Infobox references

Cyclotetradecaheptaene, often referred to as [14]annulene, is a hydrocarbon with molecular formula C_{14}H_{14}, which played an important role in the development of criteria (Hückel's rule) for aromaticity, a stabilizing property of central importance in physical organic chemistry. It forms dark-red needle-like crystals.

== Structure and aromaticity ==
Although the conjugated ring of [14]annulene contains 4n+2 electrons, it only exhibits limited evidence for being aromatic. It does not fully conform to Hückel's rule because none of its cis/trans isomers can adopt a completely planar conformation due to crowding of the interior hydrogens. There is evidence that it has two isomeric forms of comparable stability (trans, cis, trans, cis, trans, trans, cis- with four interior hydrogens (shown in the infobox) and trans, cis, trans, cis, trans, cis, cis- with three interior hydrogens) which rapidly interconvert at room temperature but can be observed at low temperature by NMR. Its ^{1}H NMR spectrum shows evidence of aromatic ring currents that result in an upfield shift for the interior hydrogens. In contrast, the corresponding [12]- and [16]annulenes, which are weakly antiaromatic or nonaromatic, have downfield shifted interior hydrogens. However, unlike the undoubtedly aromatic [18]annulene, [14]annulene does not bear the hallmark aromatic property of chemical stability, and it quickly decomposes when exposed to light and air.
