= Tod H. Mikuriya =

American psychiatrist, cannabis researcher and activist

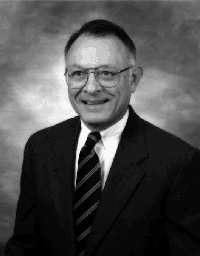
- Born: 20 September 1933
- Died: 20 May 2007 (aged 73)
- Education: Temple University (MD, 1962)
- Known for: Advocacy for legalization and standardized use of medical cannabis
- Medical career
- Profession: Psychiatrist
- Institutions: Society of Cannabis Clinicians
- Sub-specialties: Substance abuse, biofeedback therapy
- Research: Medical cannabis

Tod Hiro Mikuriya (20 September 1933 – 20 May 2007) was an American physician and psychiatrist. Known as an outspoken advocate for the use of cannabis for medical purposes and its legalization, he is often regarded as the grandfather of the medical cannabis movement in the United States.

== Life and education ==
Mikuriya was born at his Aunt Mary Schwenk Wallace's home in Brownsville, Pennsylvania, to German teacher Anna Schwenk and civil engineer Tadafumi Mikuriya, an Issei descendant of the Japanese samurai nobility. He had two sisters. His mother followed the Baháʼí Faith, and his father was a converted Christian. Mikuriya and his sisters grew up in the Quaker community of Fallsington, Pennsylvania and were raised as Quakers. He attended Quaker schools such as the George School.

Mikuriya claimed he first heard of cannabis in a children's book in 1959 and is quoted to have drawn a connection between his family's faith and his views on cannabis:

The Quakers were proprietors of the underground railway [...] The cannabis prohibition has the same dynamics as the bigotry and racism my family and I experienced starting on December 7, 1941, when we were transformed from normal-but-different people into war-criminal surrogates.

— Tod M. Mikuriya

Mikuriya attended Haverford and Guilford College before enrolling at Reed College. He earned his bachelor's degree in psychology in 1956 and conducted some graduate work at the University of Oregon School of Psychiatry. Shortly thereafter, he enlisted in the Army where he served as an attendant in the psychiatric ward of Brooke Army Hospital. He earned his medical degree from Temple University in 1962. Mikuriya completed an internship at Southern Pacific Hospital (San Francisco) and residencies in psychiatry at Oregon State Hospital and at Mendocino State Hospital.

Mikuriya died at his home in Berkeley, California on 20 May 2007 at age 73 from lung cancer. He was survived by his two sisters, son, and daughter.

== Professional career ==
=== Clinical practice ===
Mikuriya directed the drug addiction center of the New Jersey Neuropsychiatric Institute in Princeton, New Jersey from 1966–1967 before becoming a consulting research psychiatrist in charge of non-classified marijuana research at the National Institute of Mental Health (NIMH) Center for Narcotics and Drug Abuse Studies in 1967.

After two months, Mikuriya left the NIMH due to its lack of funding and support for research into positive applications of marijuana. He moved to Berkeley, California where he opened a private psychiatric practice specializing in biofeedback therapy and substance abuse. Mikuriya also worked for the Alameda County Alcoholism Clinic and the state Department of Rehabilitation. During the 1970s, Mikuriya served as Chair of the Department of Psychiatry at Eden Medical Center. To facilitate his private practice Mikuriya founded the company Mikuriya Data Systems and worked out of an office at the Claremont Hotel until he was forced to leave over his support of Proposition 215. He continued to see patients at his home for clinical consultation on cannabis until his death. He approved marijuana for medical purposes for over nine thousand patients, not solely in terminal cases, but also alleviation of physical and emotional pain in non-terminal cases.

During the late 1960s and early 1970s, Mikuriya authored a number of academic publications which inspired renewed debate on the therapeutic use of cannabis within the medical community, including the proposal of cannabis as a substitution agent as well as on issues related to the legality of cannabis. His 1972 self-published book Marijuana: Medical Papers, 1839–1972 became a landmark in the modern movement for the legalization of medical marijuana. Mikuriya continued to publish editorials throughout the 1970s and 1980s. A collection of Mikuriya's papers dated 1933–2015 is held by the National Library of Medicine.

Mikuriya's practices drew him into conflict with authorities. In 2000, the Medical Board of California (MBC) accused him of improper recommendation of cannabis without physical examinations. Law enforcement in only eleven rural northern California counties responded to solicitation by MBC investigators and officials in the California Attorney General's office. There were no complaints from patients, families or community physicians. Following their investigation, the MBC placed him on a five-year probation in 2004.

=== Political activism ===
Mikuriya was involved early on in political and civil movements focused on changing cannabis laws. In 1971, Mikuriya joined the group Amorphia, "a special interest group that was spearheading the California Marijuana Initiative." He took part in the redaction of the failed California Prop. 19 in 1972, and helped Dennis Peron organize San Francisco's Proposition P which supported medical marijuana use and passed with 79% of the vote in 1991. He is well known for helping to author 1996 California Proposition 215. He declared: "As one of the authors of the Prop 215, my claim to fame is getting the phrase 'for any other condition that Cannabis is helpful' included."

In 1980, he ran in the House of Representatives elections as a member of the Libertarian Party, against incumbent Ron Dellums, a Democrat, and Republican Charles V. Hughes for California's 8th congressional district seat. He lost, with 10,465 votes to Dellums's 108,380 and Hughes's 76,580.

In 1999, Mikuriya founded the California Cannabis Research Medical Group (CCRMG) to help physicians share and exchange data about cannabis use by their patients. Its main project, the Society of Cannabis Clinicians (SCC), facilitated voluntary medical standards for physician-approved cannabis under California law (HSC §11362.5). The CCRMG was later renamed as the SCC in 2004.

== Notable works ==
=== Books ===
- Mikuriya, Tod H (1973). Marijuana: Medical Papers, 1839–1972. Medi-comp Press. ISBN 0-9600704-1-9.

=== Selected editorials ===
- Mikuriya, Tod H. (1969). "Marijuana in medicine: past, present and future". California Medicine. 110 (1): 34–40. PMC 1503422. PMID 4883504.
- Mikuriya, Tod H. (1975). "Nonmedical Drugs, Society and Medicine: A Perspective with Suggestions". Clinical Toxicology. 8 (2): 145–148. doi:10.3109/15563657508988060. ISSN 0009-9309. PMID 1149408.
- Mikuriya, Tod H. (Apr 1970). "Cannabis substitution. An adjunctive therapeutic tool in the treatment of alcoholism". Medical Times. 98 (4): 187–191. ISSN 0025-7583. PMID 5422576.
- Mikuriya, Tod H. (Dec 1968). "Need for just marihuana laws". The American Journal of Psychiatry. 125 (6): 852–853. doi:10.1176/ajp.125.6.852. ISSN 0002-953X. PMID 5748869.
- Mikuriya, Tod H.; Jones, RT (Mar 1971). "Contemporary aspects of drug abuse; an editorial view". Clinical Toxicology. 4 (1): 119–127. doi:10.3109/15563657108990154. ISSN 0009-9309. PMID 5107069.
- Mikuriya, T. D. (1975). "Editorial. Marijuana: medical, social, and moral aspects". Clinical Toxicology. 8 (2): 233–237. doi:10.3109/15563657508988067. ISSN 0009-9309. PMID 1097169.
- Mikuriya, T. H.; Aldrich, M. R. (Jan–Mar 1988). "Cannabis 1988. Old drug, new dangers. The potency question". Journal of Psychoactive Drugs. 20 (1): 47–55. doi:10.1080/02791072.1988.10524371. ISSN 0279-1072. PMID 3292744.
