= Daniele Piomelli =

Daniele Piomelli is an Italian-born American scientist. He studied neuroscience in New York City, with James H. Schwartz and Eric R. Kandel at Columbia University College of Physicians and Surgeons (PhD, 1983–1988) and later with Paul Greengard at the Rockefeller University (Post-doc, 1988–1990). Two of his mentors (Kandel and Greengard) received in 2000 the Nobel Prize for their contributions to medicine. After working at the INSERM in Paris (1990–1995) and at the Neurosciences Institute in La Jolla (1995–1998) with Nobel Prize winner Gerald Edelman, he joined the University of California Irvine School of Medicine, where he is now Louise Turner Arnold Chair in Neurosciences and Professor of Anatomy and Neurobiology, Pharmacology and Biological Chemistry. He is also founding director of the department of Drug Discovery and Development (D3) at the Istituto Italiano di Tecnologia in Genova, Italy. He is also the editor of Cannabis and Cannabinoid Research and a board member of the non-profit International Association for Cannabinoid Medicines.

Piomelli has made important contributions to the understanding of lipid mediator function in the brain and nervous system. He elucidated the biochemical pathways involved in the formation and deactivation of the lipid-derived endocannabinoids – anandamide and 2-arachidonoylglycerol – and uncovered various physiological roles played by these compounds. Additionally, he described the functions of two lipid amides –palmitoylethanolamide (PEA) and oleoylethanolamide – in the control of pain and feeding, and identified the cellular receptors involved in such functions. Collaborating with Italian chemists, Giorgio Tarzia (University of Urbino ‘Carlo Bo’) and Marco Mor (University of Parma), he developed the first systemically active inhibitors of the degradation of anandamide (Fatty Acid Amide Hydrolase inhibitors), PEA (N-Acylethanolamide Acid Amidase inhibitors), and ceramide (Acid Ceramidase inhibitors).

Daniele Piomelli is scientific cofounder of Kadmus Pharmaceuticals and Thesan Pharmaceuticals.
