= Franz Sondheimer =

German-British chemist (1926–1981)

Franz Sondheimer FRS
- Born: May 17, 1926; Stuttgart, Germany
- Died: February 11, 1981 (aged 54); Stanford, California, United States
- Education: Imperial College London
- Known for: Contributions to the synthesis of natural products and steroid hormones
- Awards: Israel Prize (1960), Corday-Morgan Medal and Prize (1961), Fellow of the Royal Society (1967)
- Scientific career
- Fields: Chemistry
- Workplaces: Weizmann Institute, University of Cambridge, University College London

Franz Sondheimer FRS (17 May 1926 – 11 February 1981) was a German-born British professor of chemistry. In 1960, he was awarded the Israel Prize for his contributions to science.

== Biography ==
Franz Sondheimer was born in Stuttgart on 17 May 1926, the second son of Max and Ida Sondheimer. His father ran the family glue manufacturing business. His elder brother, Ernst, was Professor of Mathematics at Westfield College. Having business connections in England, Max Sondheimer managed to get his family to London in September 1937. Sondheimer, knowing no English, began his schooling in England first at Southend and then at Hailey School in Bournemouth. In 1940, having passed Common Entrance, he attended the part of Highgate School remaining in London, where he obtained School Certificate in nine subjects in 1942. A little over a year later he gained entrance to Imperial College, where he studied until the end of the war, coming top of his year in the final examination. He was awarded a PhD in 1948, having studied acetylenic compounds under the guidance of Ian Heilbron and E R H Jones.

Sondheimer moved to Harvard in 1948, to join Woodward’s group in their project on steroid synthesis. He next moved, early in 1952, to Syntex in Mexico City to succeed Carl Djerassi as head of research. During his four year stay he helped create short direct routes to cortisone, and to all of the major sex hormones. He thoroughly enjoyed his time there and was much loved and respected. He explored much of the region in his own Beechcraft Bonanza aircraft.

In 1956, aged 30, Sondheimer was appointed head of the Department of Organic Chemistry at the Weizmann Institute. He set up a strong team and “reverted to his old love, acetylene chemistry, as the basis for his most original and fundamental contribution, the chemistry of the annulenes.”

In 1963 he accepted, and then rejected, the offer of a prestigious professorship at the University of Chicago, accepting instead one of the newly created Royal Society Research Professorships at the University of Cambridge. He had considerable freedom, set up a large international group, and was made a Fellow of Churchill College. Nonetheless, he was not happy at Cambridge and transferred in 1967 to University College London. In May of that year he was elected a Fellow of the Royal Society. His membership citation read: Professor Sondheimer is distinguished for his work on the total synthesis of a range of natural products, the partial synthesis of steroid hormones and analogues, and especially for his syntheses of the hitherto unknown class of conjugated unsaturated macrocyclic compounds which has led to some interesting theoretical conclusions. On these topics he has so far published 167 papers. However, funding problems, the difficulty of recruiting foreign postdoctoral students, and his continued focus on now-unfashionable areas of research, all contributed to this not being a satisfactory chapter in his career.

Franz Sondheimer suffered from prolonged depression. He died on 11 February 1981 in his office at Stanford’s Stauffer Laboratory, where he had been on sabbatical. He had apparently committed suicide by taking cyanide.

Sondheimer's notable students include K. C. Nicolaou, Raphael Mechoulam, Timothy Walsgrove, and Henry N. C. Wong.

== Awards and honours ==
- 1960: Israel Prize, in exact sciences.
- 1961: Corday-Morgan medal and Prize.
- 1967: Fellow of the Royal Society.

== See also ==
- List of Israel Prize recipients
