= Medical cannabis research =

Medical research on using cannabis

Medical cannabis research refers to scientific investigations into the therapeutic use of cannabis and its derivatives.

The earliest systematic studies on the physiological effects of cannabis-derived chemicals were conducted in the 1920s. Research activity in this field remained relatively low and stable until 1966, when the number of publications increased tenfold over the following decade. Following the adoption of the Convention on Psychotropic Substances in 1971, the volume of research publications declined, a trend that persisted until approximately 1987. Since that time, cannabis research has steadily increased.

There is no clear inflection point corresponding to 2013, when Uruguay became the first country to fully regulate its cannabis market, encompassing production, distribution, and consumption. Subsequently, many countries implemented policies governing medical cannabis research, which vary significantly between jurisdictions.

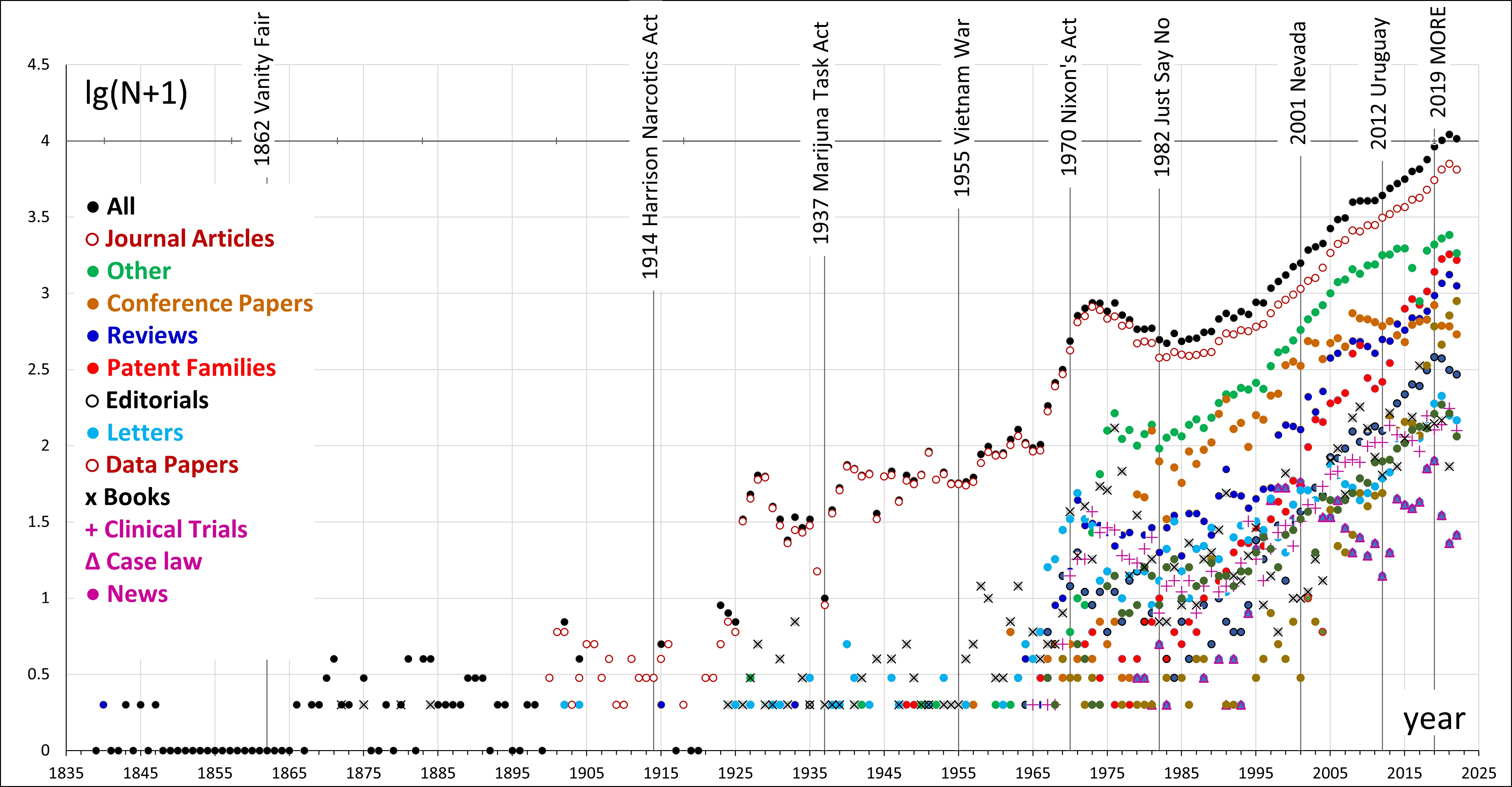
The number of publications about marijuana/cannabis according to Web of Science. These include both medical and non-medical studies.

There is mixed and inconclusive evidence on the benefits of cannabis-based medicines, frequent mild adverse effects, and generally low-to-moderate quality of evidence.

== Ethics ==
Cannabis use as a medical treatment has risen globally since 2008 for a variety of reasons including increasing popular support for cannabis legalization and increased incidence of chronic pain among patients. While medical cannabis use is increasing, there are major social and legal barriers which lead to cannabis research proceeding more slowly and differently from standard medical research. Reasons why cannabis is unusual as a treatment include that it is not a patented drug owned by the pharmaceutical industry, and that its legal status as a medical treatment is ambiguous even where it is legal to use, and that cannabis use carries outside the norm of a typical medical treatment. The ethics around cannabis research is in a state of rapid change.

== Research by region ==
=== United States ===
Research on the medical benefits of cannabis has been hindered by various federal regulations, including its Schedule I classification. To conduct research on cannabis, approval must be obtained from the Food and Drug Administration, and a license must be obtained from the Drug Enforcement Administration specific to Schedule I drugs. The FDA has 30 days to respond to proposals, while the DEA licensing can take over a year to complete. Prior to June 2015, cannabis research also required approval from the US Public Health Service. The PHS review was not performed for any other Schedule I drugs, and had no deadline imposed.

In addition to the FDA and DEA (and former PHS) requirements, the National Institute on Drug Abuse was required to review and approve all research on cannabis prior to 2021. NIDA was the only source licensed by the federal government for the cultivation and provision of cannabis, and NIDA would not provide cannabis without first approving the research. This monopoly maintained by the DEA did not exist for other Schedule I drugs, and there was no deadline established for the NIDA review either. The quality and potency of cannabis supplied by NIDA has also been called into question by some researchers. In 2021 the DEA granted additional licenses for the cultivation of cannabis, however, after first announcing intention to do so in 2016.

As a result of these requirements that have been imposed in the US, studies involving cannabis have been delayed for years in some cases, and a number of medical organizations have called for federal policy to be reformed.

A 2016 review assess the current status and prospects for development of CBD and CBD-dominant preparations for medical use in the United States, examining its neuroprotective, antiepileptic, anxiolytic, antipsychotic, and antiinflammatory properties.

In April 2018, after 5 years of research, Sanjay Gupta backed medical marijuana for conditions such as epilepsy and multiple sclerosis. He believes that medical marijuana is safer than opioid for pain management.

== Research by medical condition ==
A scoping review of 72 systematic reviews found mixed and inconclusive evidence on the benefits of cannabis-based medicines, frequent mild adverse effects, and generally low-to-moderate quality of evidence.

=== Cancer ===
Laboratory experiments have suggested that cannabis and cannabinoids have anticarcinogenic and antitumor effects, including a potential effect on breast- and lung-cancer cells. While cannabis may have potential for refractory cancer pain or use as an antiemetic, much of the evidence comes from outdated or small studies, or animal experiments.

Although there is ongoing research, claims that cannabis has been proved to cure cancer are, according to Cancer Research UK, both prevalent on the internet and "highly misleading".

There is no good evidence that cannabis use helps reduce the risk of getting cancer. Whether smoking cannabis increases cancer risk in general is difficult to establish since it is often smoked mixed with tobacco – a known carcinogen – and this complicates research. Cannabis use is linked to an increased risk of a type of testicular cancer.

The association of cannabis use with head and neck carcinoma may differ by tumor site, with both possible pro- and anticarcinogenic effects of cannabinoids. Additional work is needed to rule out various sources of bias, confounds and misclassification of cannabis exposure.

=== Dementia ===
Medical cannabis has been studied for its potential in treating dementia and dementia-related conditions but as of 2019 evidence of its usefulness remains weak.

=== Diabetes ===
From weak evidence it appears cannabis use has little effect on the risk of developing type 2 diabetes, possibly slightly reducing it.

There is emerging evidence that cannabidiol may help slow cell damage in diabetes mellitus type 1. There is a lack of meaningful evidence of the effects of medical cannabis use on people with diabetes; a 2010 review concluded that "the potential risks and benefits for diabetic patients remain unquantified at the present time".

=== Epilepsy ===
Cannabidiol (CBD) epilepsy treatments go as far back as 1800 BC. Cannabis therapy and research diminished with prohibition laws in the US. However, in 1980 a double-blind study by JM Cunha and his team renewed the interest in cannabis treatments when the data showed improvements of patients who had taken CBD oil. In 2003 and 2004 numerable sporadic reports led by German analysts also demonstrated the success of cannabis treatments with children that had severe neurological disorders. A 2016 review in The New England Journal of Medicine said that although there was a lot of hype and anecdotes surrounding medical cannabis and epilepsy, "current data from studies in humans are extremely limited, and no conclusions can be drawn". The mechanisms by which cannabis may be effective in the treatment of epilepsy remain unclear.

Some reasons for the lack of clinical research have been the introduction of new synthetic and more stable pharmaceutical anticonvulsants, the recognition of important adverse side effects, and legal restrictions to the use of cannabis-derived medicines – although in December 2015, the DEA (United States Drug Enforcement Administration) has eased some of the regulatory requirements for conducting FDA-approved clinical trials on cannabidiol (CBD).

Epidiolex, a cannabis-based product developed by GW Pharmaceuticals for experimental treatment of epilepsy, underwent stage-two trials in the US in 2014.

=== Glaucoma ===
In 2009, the American Glaucoma Society noted that while cannabis can help lower intraocular pressure, it recommended against its use because of "its side effects and short duration of action, coupled with a lack of evidence that its use alters the course of glaucoma". As of 2008 relatively little research had been done concerning therapeutic effects of cannabinoids on the eyes.

=== Tourette syndrome ===
A 2007 review of the history of medical cannabis said cannabinoids showed potential therapeutic value in treating Tourette syndrome (TS). A 2005 review said that controlled research on treating TS with dronabinol showed the patients taking the pill had a beneficial response without serious adverse effects; a 2000 review said other studies had shown that cannabis "has no effects on tics and increases the individuals inner tension".

A 2009 Cochrane review examined the two controlled trials to date using cannabinoids of any preparation type for the treatment of tics or TS (Muller-Vahl 2002, and Muller-Vahl 2003). Both trials compared delta-9-THC; 28 patients were included in the two studies (8 individuals participated in both studies). Both studies reported a positive effect on tics, but "the improvements in tic frequency and severity were small and were only detected by some of the outcome measures". The sample size was small and a high number of individuals either dropped out of the study or were excluded. The original Muller-Vahl studies reported individuals who remained in the study; patients may drop out when adverse effects are too high or efficacy is not evident. The authors of the original studies acknowledged few significant results after Bonferroni correction.

Cannabinoid medication might be useful in the treatment of the symptoms in patients with TS, but the 2009 review found that the two relevant studies of cannabinoids in treating tics had attrition bias, and that there was "not enough evidence to support the use of cannabinoids in treating tics [or] obsessive [and] compulsive behaviour[s] in people with Tourette's syndrome".

=== Other conditions ===
Anecdotal evidence and pre-clinical research has suggested that cannabis or cannabinoids may be beneficial for treating Huntington's disease or Parkinson's disease, but follow-up studies of people with these conditions have not produced good evidence of therapeutic potential. A 2001 paper argued that cannabis had properties that made it potentially applicable to the treatment of amyotrophic lateral sclerosis, and on that basis research on this topic should be permitted, despite the legal difficulties of the time.

A 2005 review and meta-analysis said that bipolar disorder was not well-controlled by existing medications and that there were "good pharmacological reasons" for thinking cannabis had therapeutic potential, making it a good candidate for further study.

Cannabinoids have been proposed for the treatment of primary anorexia nervosa, but have no measurable beneficial effect. The authors of a 2003 paper argued that cannabinoids might have useful future clinical applications in treating digestive diseases. Laboratory experiments have shown that cannabinoids found in marijuana may have analgesic and anti-inflammatory effects.

In 2014, the American Academy of Neurology reviewed all available findings levering the use of marijuana to treat brain diseases. The result was that the scientific evidence is weak that cannabis in any form serves as medicinal for curing or alleviating neurological disorders. To ease multiple sclerosis patients' stiffness, which may be accomplished by their taking cannabis extract by mouth or as a spray, there is support. The academy has published new guidelines on the use of marijuana pills and sprays in the treatment of MS.

Cannabis is being investigated for its possible use in inflammatory bowel disease but as of 2014 there is only weak evidence for its benefits as a treatment.

A 2007 review said cannabidiol had shown potential to relieve convulsion, inflammation, cough, congestion and nausea, and to inhibit cancer cell growth. Preliminary studies have also shown potential over psychiatric conditions such as anxiety, depression, and psychosis. Because cannabidiol relieves the aforementioned symptoms, cannabis strains with a high amount of CBD may benefit people with multiple sclerosis or frequent anxiety attacks.

Canadian researchers are currently studying a strain of cannabis as a potential COVID-19 treatment.
