= International Cannabinoid Research Society =

Professional society for scientific research

- Abbreviation: ICRS
- Established: 1990 (34 years ago)
- Legal status: 501(c)(3) organization
- Headquarters: Durham
- Website: www.icrs.com

The International Cannabinoid Research Society (ICRS) is a professional society for scientific research in all fields of the cannabinoids, based in North Carolina, US. ICRS is one of very few global non-profit medical societies or associations (Note: A Medical Society is a specific type of trade association for medical professionals.) related to cannabis and cannabinoids.

== History ==
The ICRS was formally incorporated as a scientific research society in 1992. Prior to that, early ICRS Symposia were organized by various researchers in the field since 1970. Membership in the Society has risen from 50 original members in its first year to 650+ members from all over the world.

== Work ==
The International Cannabinoid Research Society is a:

- Non-political, non-religious organization dedicated to scientific research in all fields of the cannabinoids, ranging from biochemical, chemical and physiological studies of the endogenous cannabinoid system to studies of the abuse potential of recreational Cannabis.
- In addition to acting as a source for impartial information on Cannabis and the cannabinoids, the main role of the ICRS is to provide an open forum for researchers to meet and discuss their research.

== Mission ==
The mission of the ICRS is to:

1. Foster cannabinoid research;
2. promote the exchange of scientific information and perspectives about Cannabis, the cannabinoids and endocannabinoids through the organization of scientific meetings;
3. serve as a source of reliable information regarding the chemistry, pharmacology, therapeutic uses, toxicology and the behavioral, psychological, and social effects of Cannabis and its constituents, of synthetic and endogenous compounds that interact with cannabinoid receptors, and of any compounds that target other components of the endocannabinoid system.

== Journal ==
Since 2019, the ICRS has partnered with Mary Ann Liebert, Inc. Publishers to produce the academic journal Cannabis and Cannabinoid Research.

ICRS awards the "Raphael Mechoulam Award in Cannabinoid Research" annually.

== Annual Symposia ==
The Society holds an annual meeting, not available to the media, which generally alternates between North America and Europe.

Year	Location
2025	Bloomington, IN
2024	Salamanca, Spain
2023	Toronto, Canada
2022	Galway, Ireland
2021	Jerusalem, Israel (Held virtually due to COVID-19 pandemic)
2020	Galway, Ireland (Held virtually due to COVID-19 pandemic)
2019	Bethesda, MD
2018	Leiden, Netherlands
2017	Montreal, QC, Canada
2016	Bukovina, Poland
2015	Wolfville, NS, Canada
2014	Baveno, Italy
2013	Vancouver, BC, Canada
2012	Freiburg, Germany
2011	Pheasant Run, IL
2010	Lund, Sweden
2009	Pheasant Run, IL
2008	Aviemore, Scotland
2008	Limmasol, Cyprus
2007	St. Sauveur, QC, Canada
2006	Tihany, Hungary
2005	Clearwater, FL
2004	Paestum, Italy
2003	Cornwall, ON, Canada
2002	Asilomar, CA
2001	Escorial, Spain
2000	Hunt Valley, MD
1999	Acapulco, Mexico
1998	La Grande Motte, France
1997	Stone Mountain, GA
1996	Cape Cod, MA
1995	Scottsdale, AZ
1994	L'Estérel, QC, Canada
1993	Toronto, ON, Canada
1992	Keystone, CO
1991	West Palm Beach, FL
1990	Κολυμβάρι, Crete, Greece
