= N-Substituted pyridinium cations =

Many quaternary ammonium cations are derived from pyridine. They are derivatives of pyridinium in which the nitrogen atom is positively charged, and the hydrogen attached to the nitrogen is replaced by another group.

== Occurrence in nature ==
Pyridiniums have also been isolated from natural sources. One pyridinium used in cellular metabolism is nicotinamide adenine dinucleotide (NAD). Pachychaline A was isolated from caribbean marine sponge Pachychaline sp. Desmosine is a biomarker for COPD.

examples of pyridinium species occurring in nature

== Applications ==
The permanently charged nature of N-alkyl pyridinium salts makes them useful in mass spectrometry. Examples in which pyridinium based charges were used includes peptides, and fatty acids. Pyridinium salts are also used for MALDI-MSI (mass spec imaging) to quantify metabolites in tissue slices.

Alkyl and aryl substituted pyridiniums have been explored as ionic liquids.

Various pyridinium species have found use as reagents or as intermediates for the synthesis of heterocycles.

The pyridinium motif is present in the herbicide paraquat.

== Preparation ==
Various ways to prepare N-substituted pyridinium salts are known. A straightforward way to prepare N-alkyl pyridiniums is to use the nucleophilic nature of the nitrogen lone pair to alkylate it with electrophilic alkylating reagents. Similarly, alkylated pyridinium salts may also be prepared by performing Michael addition to maleic acids.

Analogously, N-amino pyridinium species may be prepared by reaction pyridines with electrophilic nitrogen reagents, in example hydroxylamine-O-sulfonic acid.

N-aryl pyridinium salts require different conditions to be made. Common approaches include the Zincke reaction or the reaction between pyrilium and anilines. Alternatively, denovo synthesis of the pyridine ring allows for incorporation of a N-aryl subtituent.

== Reactivity ==
In the presence of phosphines, N-alkyl pyridiniums are readily dealkylated to yield the corresponding pyridine.

The electron poor nature of the pyridinium ring makes the pyridinium more reactive towards nucleophiles. Halogenated pyridinium salts readily undergo SnAr reactions. Mukaiyama´s reagent (2-Chloro-1-methylpyridinium Iodide) takes advantage of this reactivity, a carboxylate reacts at the halogenated C2 position forming the activated ester which may be substituted by various nucleophiles.

Pyridinium species are also key intermediates in the Minisci reaction. In which the charged ring results in lowering of the LUMO, resulting in a better match with the SOMO of a nucleophilic radical, speeding up the reaction. Depending on the substrate, the LUMO coefficients of pyridinium cations at C2/C6 and C4 differ slightly. This typically results in mixtures of regio isomers. One strategy to control the regiochemistry of the Minischi reaction is inclusion of a steric blocking group, preventing C2/C6 additions.

Pyridinium species are also reactive towards conventional carbon nucleophiles, yielding N substituted 1,2- and 1,4-dihydropyridines. Examples include Grignard reagents and silyl enol ethers. The regioselectivity is dependent on the substitution pattern of the pyridinium and the used nucleophile. Similarly, inclusion of a blocking group has been demonstrated to be an effective strategy for selective nucleophilic addition to the C4 position.

When amines are used as the nucleophile, the pyridinium undergoes ring opening to yield linear conjugated imines, which may be hydrolysed to yield the aldehyde. These so called Zincke aldehydes are useful intermediates is synthesis.

== Related N substitutions ==
The parent compound, with only a proton attached to nitrogen, is pyridinium.

Pyridine-N-oxide is readily prepared by oxidation of pyridine using peroxy acids.

Pyridinium ylides are also useful intermediates in synthesis. Pyridinium ylides may be formed via deprotonation of the corresponding N-alkyl pyridinium or by the reaction between a pyridine and a carbene. An example of the use of pyridinium ylides as a nucleophile is in the Kröhnke pyridine synthesis. Pyridinium ylides also readily undergo dipolar cycloadditions. Depending on the substitution pattern of the pyridinium ring, when put in the triplet state using a triplet sensitizer, N-N pyridinium ylides have been demonstrated to undergo [2+3] cycloaddition with the pyridinium ring itself or it transfers the heteroatom attached to the nitrogen.
