= Pyridinium chloride =

Chemical compound

- Pyridinium chloride The chemical structure of pyridinium chloride

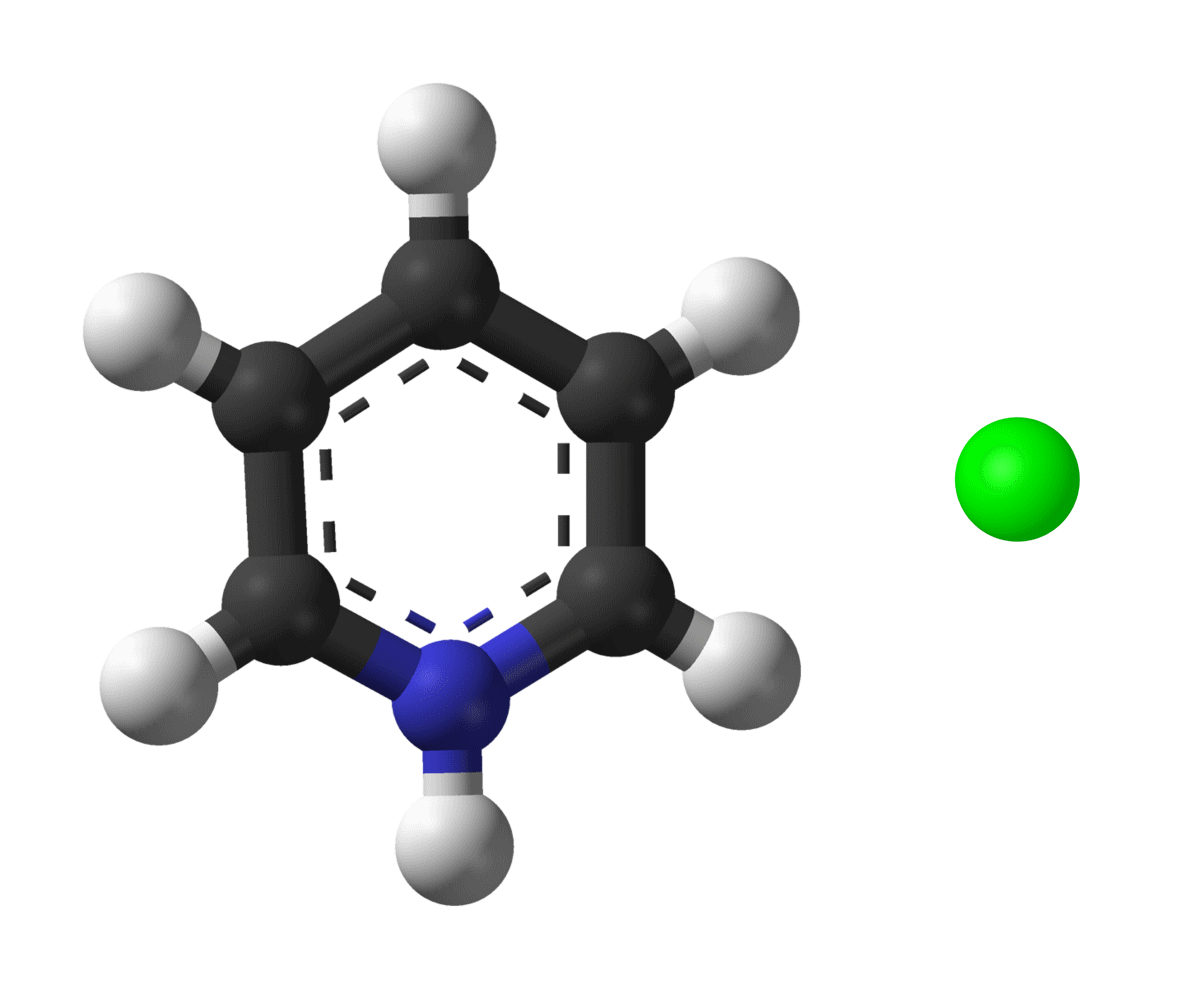

Names
- IUPAC name Pyridinium chloride
- Other names Pyridine hydrochloride

Identifiers
CAS Number	628-13-7
3D model (JSmol)	Interactive image
ChemSpider	62609
ECHA InfoCard	100.010.026
EC Number	211-027-4
PubChem CID	69401
UNII	1U87419851
CompTox Dashboard (EPA)	DTXSID6027262
- InChI: InChI=1S/C5H5N.ClH/c1-2-4-6-5-3-1;/h1-5H;1H Key: AOJFQRQNPXYVLM-UHFFFAOYSA-N
- SMILES: C1=CC=[NH+]C=C1.[Cl-]

Properties
Chemical formula	C_{5}H_{6}ClN
Molar mass	115.56 g·mol^{−1}
Appearance	Hygroscopic white crystals
Density	1.34 g/cm^{3}
Melting point	144 °C (291 °F; 417 K)
Boiling point	Decomposes
Solubility in water	85 g / 100 mL
Solubility	Soluble in chloroform, ethanol, insoluble in diethyl ether
Vapor pressure	1 (0 °C)
Acidity (pK_{a})	5

Hazards
- Occupational safety and health (OHS/OSH)
Main hazards	Irritant
- GHS labelling
Pictograms	(GHS07: Exclamation mark)
Signal word	Warning
Hazard statements	H302, H312, H315, H319, H332, H335
Precautionary statements	P261, P264, P270, P271, P280, P301+P312, P302+P352, P304+P312, P304+P340, P305+P351+P338, P312, P321, P330, P332+P313, P337+P313, P362, P403+P233, P405, P501
NFPA 704 (fire diamond)	2 0 0
Flash point	Non-flammable
Autoignition temperature	Non-flammable
- Lethal dose or concentration (LD, LC)
LD_{50} (median dose)	1600 mg/kg (oral, rat)
- Safety data sheet (SDS)
- Except where otherwise noted, data are given for materials in their standard state (at 25 °C [77 °F], 100 kPa). Infobox references

Pyridinium chloride is an organic chemical compound with a formula of C_{5}H_{5}NHCl.

== Preparation ==
Pyridinium chloride can be produced by passing hydrogen chloride in pyridine dissolved in diethyl ether, from which it precipitates:

C_{5}H_{5}N + HCl → C_{5}H_{6}N^{+}Cl^{−} ↓

== Acidity ==
Containing a pyridinium ion, pyridinium chloride has a pK_{a} of approximately 5, slightly more acidic than that of typical amines. This is due to the hybridization of the nitrogen: the nitrogen is sp^{2} hybridized and more electronegative than those nitrogens in ammonium cations, which are sp^{3} hybridized. Hence they are stronger acids than amines and can be more easily deprotonated by bases.
