= Chichibabin reaction =

Method for producing 2-aminopyridine derivatives

Named after	Aleksei Chichibabin
Reaction type	Substitution reaction

Identifiers
RSC ontology ID	RXNO:0000527

The Chichibabin reaction (pronounced ' (chē')-chē-bā-bēn) is a method for producing 2-aminopyridine derivatives by the reaction of pyridine with sodium amide. It was reported by Aleksei Chichibabin in 1914. The following is the overall form of the general reaction:

The direct amination of pyridine with sodium amide can take place in liquid ammonia or an aprotic solvent such as xylene is commonly used. Following the addition elimination mechanism first a nucleophilic NH_{2}^{−} is added while a hydride (H^{−}) is leaving. The reaction formally is a nucleophilic substitution of hydrogen S_{N}H.

Ciganek describes an example of an intramolecular Chichibabin reaction in which a nitrile group on a fused ring is the source of nitrogen in amination.

== Mechanism ==

It is widely accepted that the Chichibabin reaction mechanism is an addition-elimination reaction that proceeds through an σ-adduct (Meisenheimer adduct) intermediate (the second structure shown in the reaction sequence). First, the nucleophilic NH_{2}^{−} group adds to the δ+ ring carbon atom, pushing electrons onto the ring nitrogen atom and forming the anionic σ-adduct, which is stabilized by sodium. Electrons from the N atom are then pushed towards the ring to regain aromaticity, forming a C=N bond and ejecting a hydride ion in the process. In forming hydrogen gas, the hydride deprotonates either ammonia, re-forming sodium amide, or the product, 2-aminopyridine. A workup step with acid is included to ensure formation of 2-aminopyridine.

Reaction progress can be measured by the formation of hydrogen gas and red color from σ-adduct formation. Sodium amide is a handy reagent for the Chichibabin reaction but handling it can be dangerous and caution is advised.

- σ-adduct (Meisenheimer adduct) formation

Evidence indicates that before addition of the amino group, the ring nitrogen atom is sorbed onto the surface of sodium amide and the sodium cation forms a coordination complex. This increases the δ+ on the α-carbon atom, thus 1,2-addition of sodium amide is favored over 1,4-addition. The proximity of the amino group to the α-carbon atom once the coordination complex is formed also makes the 1,2-addition more likely to occur.

Some data exists that supports a single electron transfer as the proposed pathway for σ-adduct formation.

In most cases, the anionic σ-adduct is unstable making its formation the rate determining step.

- Hydride ion elimination

In addition to the mechanism shown above, other pathways have been proposed for the elimination step. The mechanism above, loss of the hydride ion followed by abstraction of a proton, is supported by the fact that the nucleophile needs at least one hydrogen atom for the reaction to proceed. Another competing pathway could be the elimination of hydride by sodium to form sodium hydride.

== Factors influencing reaction ==
Different aromatic nitrogen heterocyclic compounds proceed through the Chichibabin reaction in a matter of minutes and others can take hours. Factors that influence the reaction rate include:

- Basicity - The ideal pKa range is 5-8 and the reaction either does not proceed, or proceeds poorly outside of this range. The reaction occurs faster under more basic conditions but only up to a point because when electron density builds up on the α-carbon, it makes it less electrophilic. The strongest base known to aminate is 4-dimethylaminopyridine (pKa 9.37).
- δ+ on α-carbon - For kinetically controlled additions, the rate of amination is related to the magnitude of the partial positive charge on the carbon next to the ring nitrogen. For thermodynamically controlled additions, the rate of amination is related to the stability of the σ-adduct.
- Ease of hydride elimination - Success of this reaction is also dependent on the ease at which the hydride ion leaves and the ring regains aromaticity. The rate of amination for three azoles proceeds quickest to slowest as follows: 1-methylbenzimidazole > 1-methylnaphth-[2,3-d]imidazole > 3-methylnaphth[1,2-d]imidazole. Since the addition of the amide ion proceeds quickly with these substrates, the differences in reaction rates is most likely their propensity for hydride elimination and reformation of an aromatic ring.
- Substituents - Electron-withdrawing groups inhibit the Chichibabin reaction. Three proposed ideas of why this is are (1) they decrease the basicity of the ring nitrogen and slow down the sorption on sodium amide, (2) these electron-withdrawing groups can also form complexes with sodium amide, and (3) for single electron transfer pathway, altering the distribution of spin density of the intermediate radical anion.

Substrates with σ-dimethoxy groups don't aminate because they form a stable complex with sodium amide.

Electron-donating groups also inhibit the Chichibabin reaction because of their deactivating effects.

- Benzo annelation - Since the hydride ion is a poor leaving group, benzo annelation increases reactivity of the substrate in the Chichibabin reaction. This is demonstrated by the fact that 1-methylimidazole does not work as a substrate, but 1-methylbenzimidazole reacts easily.
- Solvent - The ability of the polar anionic σ-adduct to form will depend on the solvating capacity and the dielectric constant of the solvent.
- Temperature - The rule of thumb in aprotic solvents (where σ-adduct formation is the rate determining step) is to run the reaction at the lowest temperature for good hydrogen evolution to avoid the decomposition that occurs at high temperatures.

== Side reaction ==
Dimerization is a side reaction that can occur. When heated in xylene and sodium amide at atmospheric pressure, the substrate 4-tert-butylpyridine produces 89% of the dimer product (4,4'-di-tert-butyl-2,2'-bipyridine) and only 11% of the aminated Chichibabin product (2-amino-4-tert-butylpyridine). When subjected to 350 psi nitrogen pressure and the same conditions, the yields are 74% of the aminated Chichibabin product and 26% of the dimer product.

== See also ==
- Amination
