= Chichibabin pyridine synthesis =

Method for synthesizing pyridine rings

Named after	Aleksei Chichibabin
Reaction type	Ring forming reaction

Identifiers
RSC ontology ID	RXNO:0000526

The Chichibabin pyridine synthesis (/ˈtʃiːtʃiːˌbeɪbiːn/) is a method for synthesizing pyridine rings. The reaction involves the condensation reaction of aldehydes, ketones, α,β-unsaturated carbonyl compounds, or any combination of the above, with ammonia. It was reported by Aleksei Chichibabin in 1924. Methyl-substituted pyridines, which show widespread uses among multiple fields of applied chemistry, are prepared by this methodology.

== Representative syntheses ==
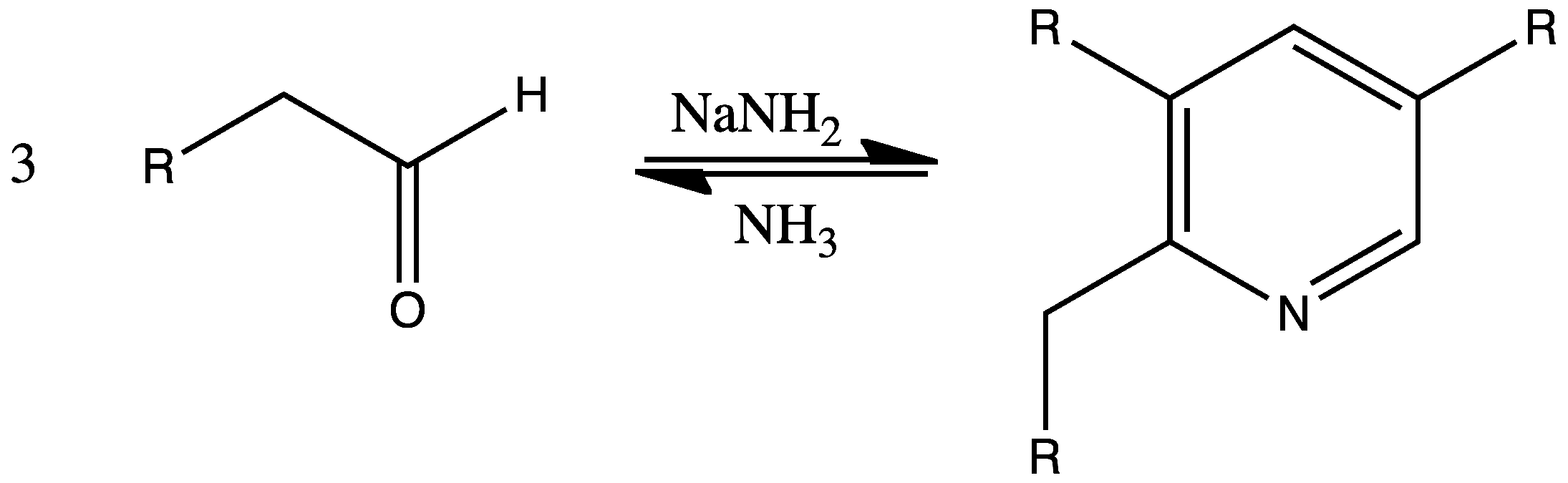

The syntheses are presently conducted commercially in the presence of oxide catalysts such as modified alumina (Al_{2}O_{3}) or silica (SiO_{2}). The reactants are passed over the catalyst at 350–500 °C. 2-Methylpyridine and 4-methylpyridine are produced as a mixture from acetaldehyde and ammonia. 3-Methylpyridine and pyridine are produced from acrolein and ammonia. Acrolein and propionaldehyde reacting with ammonia affords mainly 3-methylpyridine. 5-Ethyl-2-methylpyridine is produced from paraldehyde and ammonia.

=== Mechanism and optimizations ===
These syntheses involve many reactions such as imine synthesis, base-catalyzed aldol condensations, and Michael reactions.

Many efforts have been made to improve the method. Conducting the reaction in the gas phase in the presence of aluminium(III) oxide or zeolites has been shown to improve conversion and selectivity.

=== From nitriles ===
Many variations have been explored. One approach employs nitriles as the nitrogen source. For example, acrylonitrile and acetone affords 2-methylpyridine uncontaminated with the 4-methyl derivative. In another variation, alkynes and nitriles react in the presence of organocobalt catalysts, a reaction inspired by alkyne trimerization.

== See also ==
- Chichibabin reaction
- Gattermann–Skita synthesis
- Hantzsch pyridine synthesis
- Ciamician–Dennstedt rearrangement
