= Pyridine (data page) =

Chemical data page

This page provides supplementary chemical data on pyridine.

== Material Safety Data Sheet ==
The handling of this chemical may incur notable safety precautions. It is highly recommend that you seek the Material Safety Datasheet (MSDS) for this chemical from a reliable source such as eChemPortal, and follow its directions. MSDS is available from Sigma - Aldrich.

== Structure and properties ==
Structure and properties
Index of refraction, n_{D}	1.509 at 20 °C
Abbe number	?
Dielectric constant, ε_{r}	12.3 ε_{0} at 25 °C
Bond strength	?
Bond length	?
Bond angle	?
Magnetic susceptibility	?
Surface tension	40.8 dyn/cm at 0 °C; 38.0 dyn/cm at 20 °C; 26.4 dyn/cm at 100 °C
Viscosity	0.974 mPa·s at 20 °C

== Thermodynamic properties ==
Phase behavior
Triple point	231.48 K (–41.67 °C), ? Pa
Critical point	619 K (346 °C), 5660 Pa
Std enthalpy change of fusion, Δ_{fus}H^{~~o~~}	8.28 kJ/mol
Std entropy change of fusion, Δ_{fus}S^{~~o~~}	35.8 J/(mol·K)
Std enthalpy change of vaporization, Δ_{vap}H^{~~o~~}	40.2 kJ/mol
Std entropy change of vaporization, Δ_{vap}S^{~~o~~}	? J/(mol·K)
Solid properties
Std enthalpy change of formation, Δ_{f}H^{~~o~~}_{solid}	? kJ/mol
Standard molar entropy, S^{~~o~~}_{solid}	? J/(mol K)
Heat capacity, c_{p}	? J/(mol K)
Liquid properties
Std enthalpy change of formation, Δ_{f}H^{~~o~~}_{liquid}	100 kJ/mol
Standard molar entropy, S^{~~o~~}_{liquid}	177 J/(mol K)
Enthalpy of combustion, Δ_{c}H^{~~o~~}	–2782 kJ/mol
Heat capacity, c_{p}	132.72 J/(mol K)
Gas properties
Std enthalpy change of formation, Δ_{f}H^{~~o~~}_{gas}	140 kJ/mol at 25 °C
Standard molar entropy, S^{~~o~~}_{gas}	? J/(mol K) at 25 °C
Heat capacity, c_{p}	157.8 J/(mol K) at 25 °C

== Vapor pressure of liquid ==
P in mm Hg	1	10	40	100	400	760
T in °C	–18.9	13.2	38.0	57.8	95.6	115.4

Table data obtained from CRC Handbook of Chemistry and Physics 44th ed.

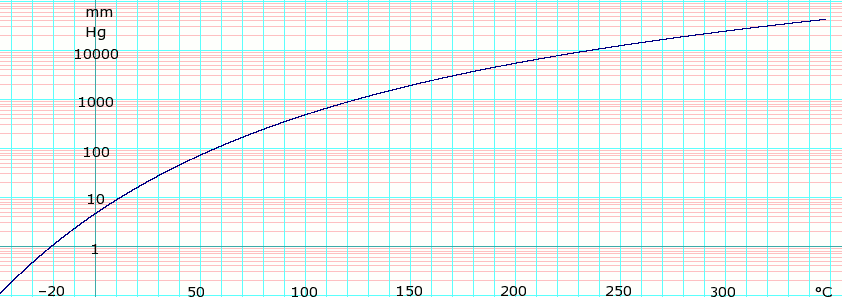
log_{10} of Pyridine vapor pressure. Uses formula: $\scriptstyle \log_e P_{mmHg} =$$\scriptstyle \log_e (\frac {760} {101.325}) - 8.907666\log_e(T+273.15) - \frac {7221.386} {T+273.15} + 75.52152 + 5.304278 \times 10^{-06} (T+273.15)^2$ obtained from CHERIC

== Spectral data ==
UV-Vis
λ_{max}	? nm
Extinction coefficient, ε	?
IR
Major absorption bands	? cm^{−1}
NMR
Proton NMR
Carbon-13 NMR
Other NMR data
MS
Masses of main fragments

This box:
- Except where noted otherwise, data relate to Standard temperature and pressure.
- Reliability of data general note.
