= Radical substitution =

Substitution reaction in organic chemistry involving free radicals

In organic chemistry, a radical-substitution reaction is a substitution reaction involving free radicals as a reactive intermediate.

The reaction involves several steps:

The overall reaction (equation 1) substitutes X in the substrate A−X to give A−Y. In the first step of radical substitution, called initiation (equation 2), a pair of free radicals are created by homolysis. Homolysis can be brought about by heat or ultraviolet light, or by radical initiators such as organic peroxides or azo compounds (labeled "init" in equation 3). In the propagation steps (4,5) the substitution takes place. Because a new radical is created by the propagation steps, this radical is able to participate in further reactions, repeating the propagation steps to give chain propagation. The final step is called termination (6,7), in which each radical species recombines with another radical to give stable products.

== Types ==
In free-radical halogenation reactions, radical substitution takes place with halogen reagents and alkane substrates. Another important class of radical substitutions involve aryl radicals. One example is the hydroxylation of benzene by Fenton's reagent. Many oxidation and reduction reactions in organic chemistry have free radical intermediates, for example the oxidation of aldehydes to carboxylic acids with chromic acid. Coupling reactions can also be considered radical substitutions. Certain aromatic substitutions takes place by radical-nucleophilic aromatic substitution. Auto-oxidation is a process responsible for deterioration of paints and food, as well as production of certain lab hazards such as diethyl ether peroxide.

Other types of radical substitution include:

- The Barton–McCombie deoxygenation involves substitution of a hydroxyl group for a proton.
- The Wohl–Ziegler reaction involves allylic bromination of alkenes.
- The Hunsdiecker reaction converts silver salts of carboxylic acids to alkyl halides.
- The Dowd–Beckwith reaction involves ring expansion of cyclic β-keto esters.
- The Barton reaction involves synthesis of nitrosoalcohols from nitrites.
- The Minisci reaction involves generation of an alkyl radical from a carboxylic acid and a silver salt, and subsequent substitution at an aromatic compound
