= Minisci reaction =

Reaction in organic chemistry

Named after	Francesco Minisci
Reaction type	Coupling reaction

The Minisci reaction (Italian: [miˈniʃʃi]) is a named reaction in organic chemistry. It is a nucleophilic radical substitution to an electron deficient aromatic compound, most commonly the introduction of an alkyl group to a nitrogen containing heterocycle. The reaction was published in 1971 by F. Minisci. In the case of N-Heterocycles, the conditions must be acidic to ensure protonation of said heterocycle. A typical reaction is that between pyridine and pivalic acid with silver nitrate, sulfuric acid and ammonium persulfate to form 2-tert-butylpyridine. The reaction resembles Friedel-Crafts alkylation but with opposite reactivity and selectivity.

The Minisci reaction often produces a mixture of regioisomers that can complicate product purification, but modern reaction conditions are incredibly mild, allowing a wide range of alkyl groups to be introduced. Depending on the radical source used, one side-reaction is acylation, with the ratio between alkylation and acylation depending on the substrate and the reaction conditions. Due to the inexpensive raw materials and simple reaction conditions, the Minisci reaction has found many applications in heterocyclic chemistry.

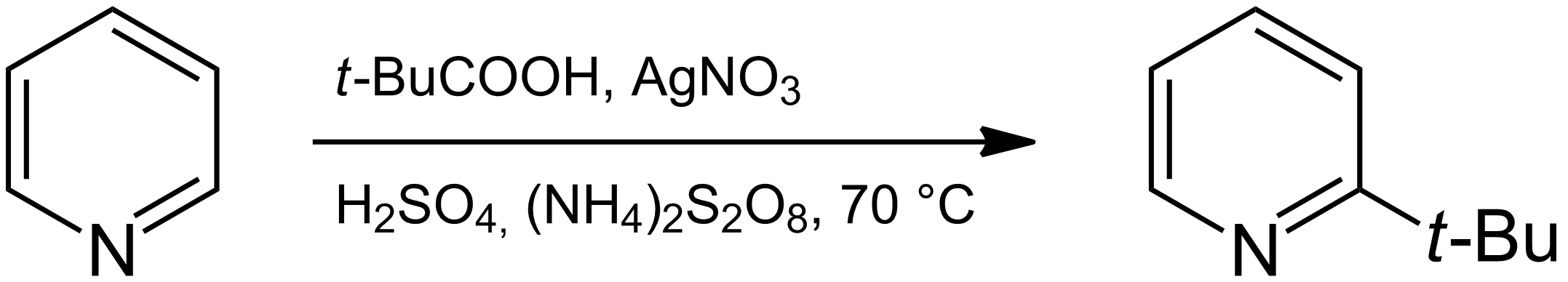
Reaction between pyridine and pivalic acid to 2-tert-butylpyridine

== Utility of the Minisci Reaction ==
The reaction allows for alkylation of electron deficient heterocyclic species which is not possible with Friedel-Crafts chemistry. A method for alkylating electron deficient arenes, nucleophilic aromatic substitution, is also unavailable to electron deficient heterocycles as the ionic nucleophilic species used will deprotonate the heterocycle over acting as a nucleophile. Again, in contrast to nucleophilic aromatic substitution, the Minisci reaction does not require functionalisation of the arene, allowing for direct C-H functionalisation.

Further to this, the generated alkyl radical species will not rearrange during the reaction in the way that alkyl fragments appended by Friedel-Crafts alkylation often will; meaning groups such as n-pentyl and cyclopropyl groups can be added unchanged. The alkyl radical is also a 'soft' nucleophile and so is very unlikely to interact with any 'hard' electrophiles (carbonyl species for example) already present on the heterocycle, which increases the functional group tolerance of the reaction.

The reaction has been the subject of much research in recent years, with a focus placed on improved reactivity towards a greater variety of heterocycles, increasing the number of alkylating reagents that can be used, and employing milder oxidants and acids.

== Mechanism ==
A free radical is formed from the carboxylic acid in an oxidative decarboxylation with silver salts and an oxidizing agent. The oxidizing agent (ammonium persulfate) oxidizes the Ag(+) to Ag(2+) under the acidic reaction conditions. This induces a hydrogen atom abstraction by the silver, followed by radical decarboxylation. The carbon-centered radical then reacts with the pyridinium aromatic compound. The ultimate product is formed by rearomatization. The acylated product is formed from the acyl radical.

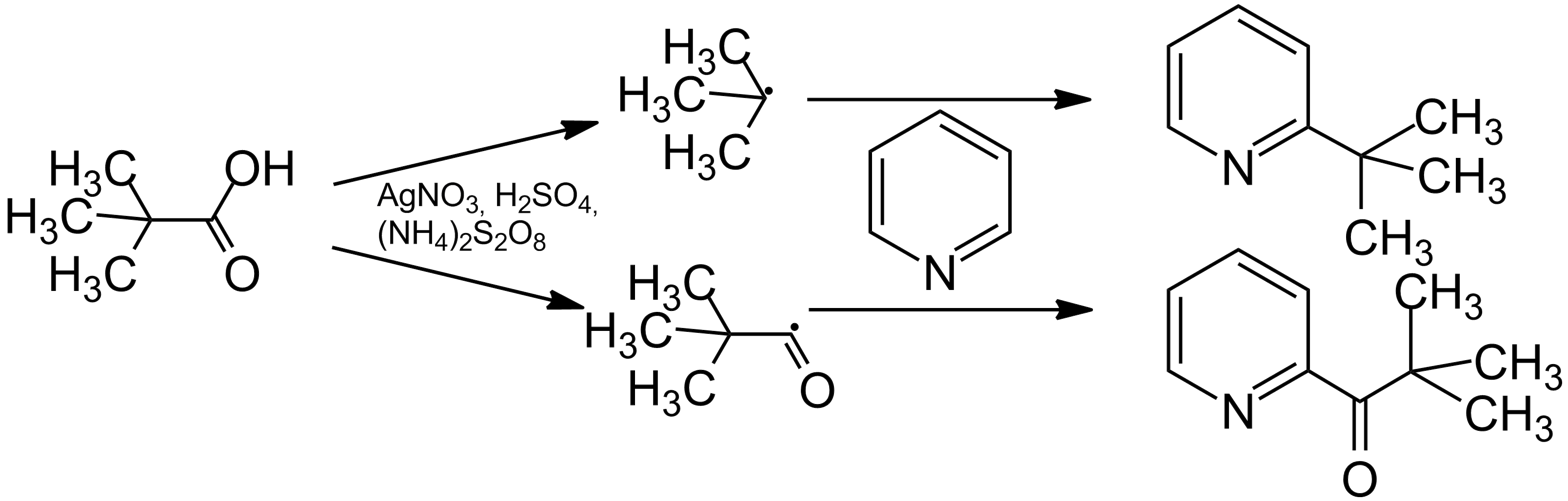
