= Aleksei Chichibabin =

Russian chemist

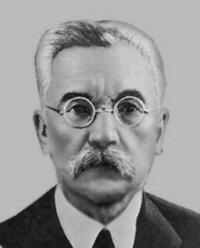
- Born: March 17, 1871; Kuzemin, Poltava Governorate, Russian Empire
- Died: August 15, 1945 (aged 74); Paris, France
- Education: Imperial Moscow University (1892)
- Known for: Chichibabin reaction, Chichibabin pyridine synthesis
- Awards: Lenin Prize (1926)

Alekséy Yevgényevich Chichibábin (Russian: Алексей Евгеньевич Чичибабин; 29 March [O.S. 17 March] 1871 – 15 August 1945) was a Soviet Russian organic chemist. His name is also written Alexei Yevgenievich Chichibabin and Alexei Euguenievich Tchitchibabine.

He made several contributions to pyridine chemistry including the Chichibabin amination reaction, and the Chichibabin pyridine synthesis.

== Life ==
Chichibábin was born in Kuzemin on March 17, 1871. He studied at the University of Moscow from 1888 until 1892, and received his PhD from the University of Saint Petersburg. In 1896, Chichibáin married Vera Vladimirovna as his wife. He became a professor at the Imperial College of Technology in Moscow in 1909, and remained there until 1929. After losing his daughter Natacha, a chemist, to an industrial oleum accident (explosion) that he deemed preventable, Chichibábin moved to Paris where he remained despite threat of and eventual stripping of his Soviet citizenship and his position in the Academy of Sciences (1936, Academy standing restored posthumously, 1990). In 1931 he began working at the Collège de France, remaining until his death in 1945, but also serving over parts of the same period as the director of research at French dye and fine chemical manufacturer Établissement Kuhlmann, and as an advisor to the Schering and Roosevelt Co. of New York.

Chichibábin and his wife, Vera Vladmirovna Tchitchibabine, had one child, a daughter who became a chemist. Chichibábin died in 1945 and was buried at the Sainte-Geneviève-des-Bois Russian Cemetery near Paris.

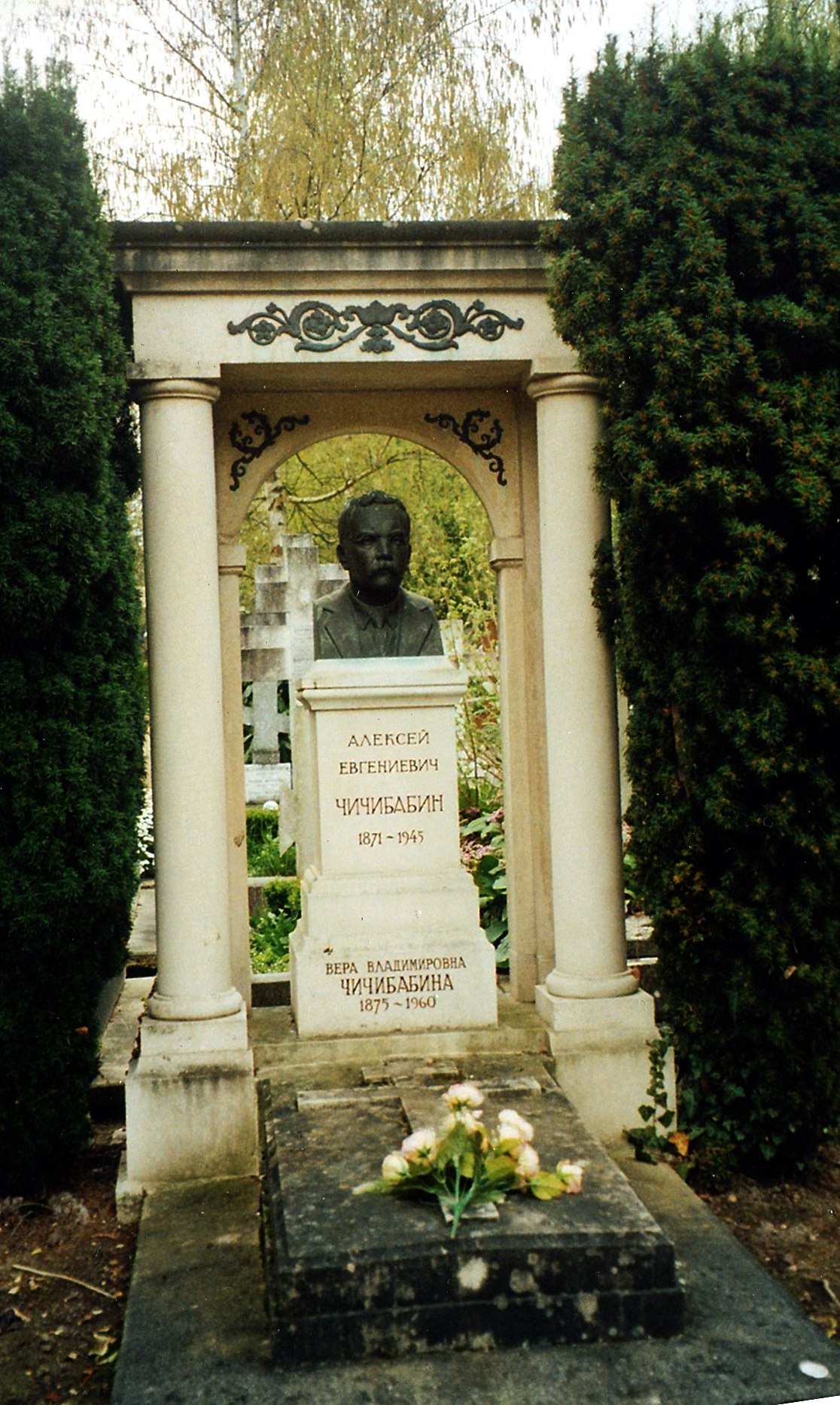
Grave in Sainte-Geneviève-des-Bois Russian Cemetery

== Scientific work ==
Chichibábin is associated with the development of several important organic chemical reactions. One is a novel terpyridine synthesis, the Chichibabin pyridine synthesis. The other reactions are the Bodroux-Chichibabin aldehyde synthesis and the Chichibabin reaction.

Chichibábin authored the two-volume Osnovnye nachala organicheskoy khimii (Fundamentals of Organic Chemistry), which first appeared in 1924, a principal university-level chemistry textbooks in the Soviet Union that went through 7 Russian editions and was translated into Czech, Slovak, Hungarian, French, Spanish, English, and Chinese. An edition of the book was dedicated to Chichibábin's daughter, Natacha, who was killed by an oleum explosion in a chemical production factory in 1930.

Chichibábin won the Lenin Prize in 1926.

== Bibliography ==
- "A. Andreev, D. Tsygankov". Imperial Moscow University: 1755-1917: encyclopedic dictionary. Moscow: Russian political encyclopedia (ROSSPEN). 2010. pp. 824–825. ISBN 978-5-8243-1429-8.
