= Addition–elimination reaction =

Chemical reaction mechanism of addition followed by elimination

In chemistry, an addition-elimination reaction is a two-step reaction process of an addition reaction followed by an elimination reaction. This gives an overall effect of substitution, and is the mechanism of the common nucleophilic acyl substitution often seen with esters, amides, and related structures.

Another common type of addition–elimination is the reversible reaction of amines with carbonyls to form imines in the alkylimino-de-oxo-bisubstitution reaction, and the analogous reaction of interconversion imines with alternate amine reactants.

The hydrolysis of nitriles to carboxylic acids is also a form of addition-elimination.
