= Carbonyl group =

Functional group (C=O)

A ketone compound containing a carbonyl group (C=O)

In organic chemistry, a carbonyl group is a functional group with the formula C=O, composed of a carbon atom double-bonded to an oxygen atom, and it is divalent at the C atom. It is common to several classes of organic compounds (such as aldehydes, ketones and carboxylic acid), as part of many larger functional groups. A compound containing a carbonyl group is often referred to as a carbonyl compound.

The term carbonyl can also refer to carbon monoxide as a ligand in an inorganic or organometallic complex (a metal carbonyl, e.g. nickel carbonyl).

== Carbonyl compounds ==
In organic chemistry, a carbonyl group characterizes the following types of compounds:

Compound	Aldehyde	Ketone	Carboxylic acid	Carboxylate ester	Amide
Structure	Aldehyde	Ketone	Carboxylic acid	Ester	Amide
General formula	RCHO	RCOR'	RCOOH	RCOOR'	RCONR'R''

Compound	Enone	Acyl halide	Acid anhydride	Imide
Structure	Enone	Acyl chloride	Acid anhydride	Imide
General formula	RC(O)C(R')CR''R'''	RCOX	(RCO)_{2}O	RC(O)N(R')C(O)R''

Carbon dioxide

Other organic carbonyls are urea and the carbamates, the derivatives of acyl chlorides, chloroformates and phosgene, carbonate esters, thioesters, lactones, lactams, hydroxamates, and isocyanates. Examples of inorganic carbonyl compounds are carbon dioxide and carbonyl sulfide.

A special group of carbonyl compounds are dicarbonyl compounds, which can exhibit special properties.

== Structure and reactivity ==
For organic compounds, the length of the C–O bond does not vary widely from 120 picometers. Inorganic carbonyls have shorter C–O distances: CO, 113; CO_{2}, 116; and COCl_{2}, 116 pm.

The carbonyl carbon is typically electrophilic. A qualitative order of electrophilicity is RCHO (aldehydes) > R_{2}CO (ketones) > RCO_{2}R' (esters) > RCONH_{2} (amides). A variety of nucleophiles attack, breaking the carbon-oxygen double bond.

Interactions between carbonyl groups and other substituents were found in a study of collagen. Substituents can affect carbonyl groups by addition or subtraction of electron density by means of a sigma bond. ΔHσ values are much greater when the substituents on the carbonyl group are more electronegative than carbon.

A carbonyl compound

The polarity of C=O bond also enhances the acidity of any adjacent C-H bonds. Due to the positive charge on carbon and the negative charge on oxygen, carbonyl groups are subject to additions and/or nucleophilic attacks. A variety of nucleophiles attack, breaking the carbon-oxygen double bond, and leading to addition-elimination reactions. Nucleophilic reactivity is often proportional to the basicity of the nucleophile and as nucleophilicity increases, the stability within a carbonyl compound decreases. The pK_{a} values of acetaldehyde and acetone are 16.7 and 19 respectively,

== Spectroscopy ==
- Infrared spectroscopy: the C=O double bond absorbs infrared light at wavenumbers between approximately 1600–1900 cm^{−1}(5263 nm to 6250 nm). The exact location of the absorption is well understood with respect to the geometry of the molecule. This absorption is known as the "carbonyl stretch" when displayed on an infrared absorption spectrum. In addition, the ultraviolet-visible spectra of propanone in water gives an absorption of carbonyl at 257 nm.
- Nuclear magnetic resonance: the C=O double-bond exhibits different resonances depending on surrounding atoms, generally a downfield shift. The ^{13}C NMR of a carbonyl carbon is in the range of 160–220 ppm.

== See also ==
- Carbon–oxygen bond
- Organic chemistry
- Functional group
- Bridging carbonyl
- Electrophilic addition
