= Pyridinium =

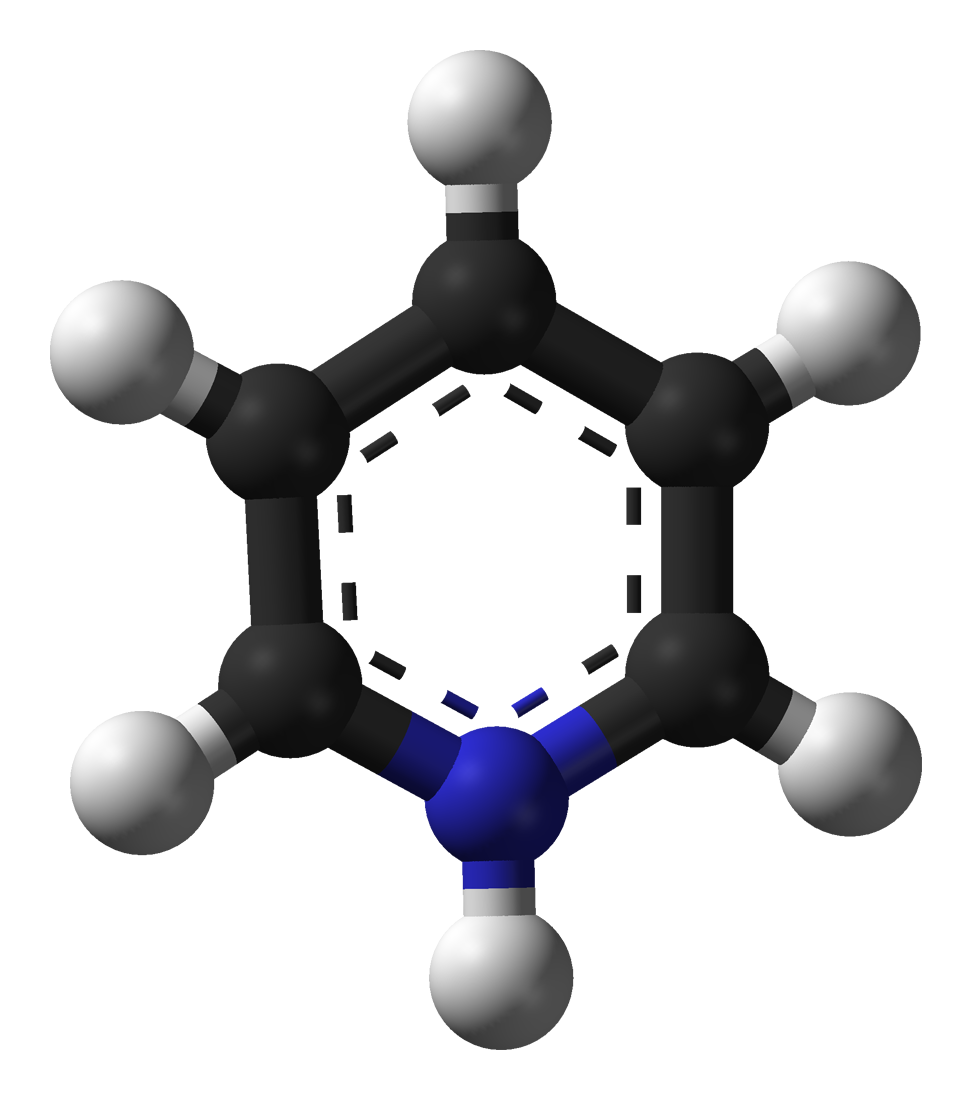

Names
- Preferred IUPAC name Pyridin-1-ium

Identifiers
CAS Number	16969-45-2
3D model (JSmol)	Interactive image
ChemSpider	4169387
PubChem CID	4989215
UNII	RNZ2DM8Q8K
CompTox Dashboard (EPA)	DTXSID20407294
- InChI: InChI=1S/C5H5N/c1-2-4-6-5-3-1/h1-5H/p+1 Key: JUJWROOIHBZHMG-UHFFFAOYSA-O; InChI=1S/C5H5N/c1-2-4-6-5-3-1/h1-5H/p+1; InChI=1S/C5H5N/c1-2-4-6-5-3-1/h1-5H/p+1 Key: JUJWROOIHBZHMG-UHFFFAOYSA-O
- SMILES: c1cc[nH+]cc1

Properties
Chemical formula	[C_{5}H_{5}NH]^{+}
Molar mass	80.110 g·mol^{−1}
Acidity (pK_{a})	~5
Conjugate base	Pyridine
- Except where otherwise noted, data are given for materials in their standard state (at 25 °C [77 °F], 100 kPa). verify (what is ?) Infobox references

Pyridinium refers to the charged cation of pyridine. The simplest being the conjugate acid [C_{5}H_{5}NH]^{+}. Many related cations are known involving substituted pyridines, e.g. picolines, lutidines, collidines. They are prepared by treating pyridine with acids.

As pyridine is often used as an organic base in chemical reactions, pyridinium salts are produced in many acid-base reactions. Its salts are often insoluble in the organic solvent, so precipitation of the pyridinium leaving group complex is an indication of the progress of the reaction.

Pyridinium cations are aromatic, as determined through Hückel's rule. They are isoelectronic with benzene.

Other N-substitutions of pyridinium exist. Examples include N-alkyl, N-aryl and N-amino pyridinium species.

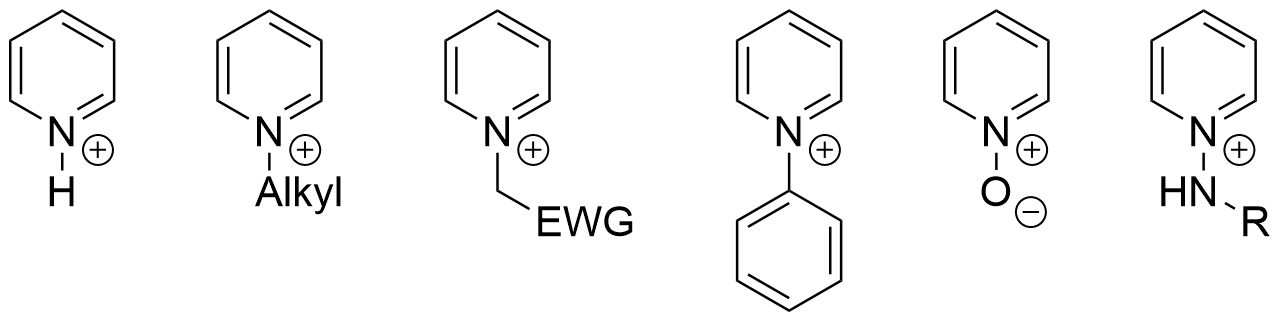
Schematic representation of various pyridinium species, without a counter anion.

== See also ==
- Pyridinium chlorochromate
- Pyridinium chloride
