= Pyridines =

Class of chemical substances

General structure of pyridines; the substituents can be alkyl groups, halogen atoms, or other substituents

Pyridines are a class of chemical substances that comprise a pyridine ring. The pyridine structure, which appears as a substructure in the of this class members, is an aromatic six-membered ring containing a nitrogen atom. Pyridines belong to the heterocycles. Pyridine rings are clearly aromatics and in many respects behave similarly to aromatic hydrocarbons. On the other hand, the presence of the nitrogen atom also leads to differences between pyridines and benzenoid aromatics; for example, pyridines react basically. Pyridines have been known since the 19th century. A particularly important figure in pyridine research was Alexei Yevgenyevich Chichibabin. The Chichibabin pyridine synthesis named after him, as well as many other pyridine syntheses, are based on the condensation of various carbonyl compounds with ammonia.

Pyridines play an essential role in living organisms, as vitamin B3 and vitamin B6 are based on a pyridine structure. Pyridine rings are also components of many alkaloids of animals and plants, including nicotine and other tobacco alkaloids. Pyridines are also of great importance in industry and research. The parent compound pyridine is used annually on a million-ton scale. Pyridine and its derivatives are used as solvents, bases, catalysts, complex ligands, and intermediates in the production of other compounds. The pyridine ring is a common and important structural element in pharmaceuticals.

== History ==
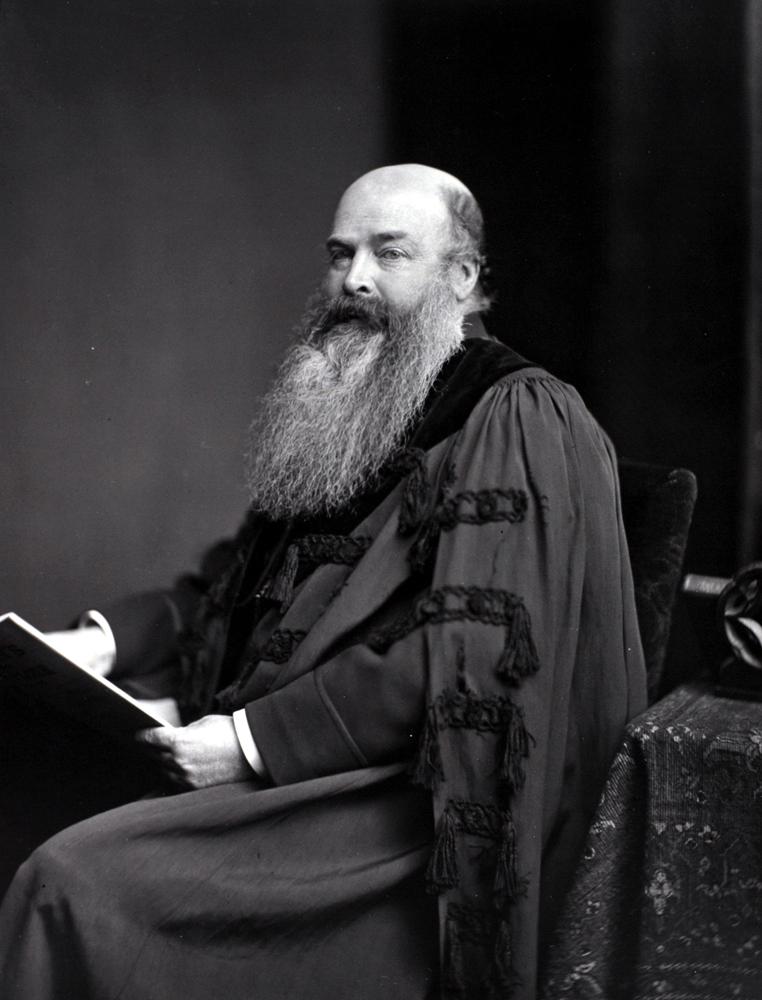
Thomas Anderson was the first to isolate pyridine and some of its derivatives

The parent compound of this group of substances, pyridine, was obtained by Thomas Anderson around 1849 during the dry distillation of bones. Anderson also isolated the picolines (methylpyridines) from coal tar and bone oil. The structure of the pyridine ring was elucidated around 1870 by Wilhelm Körner and James Dewar.

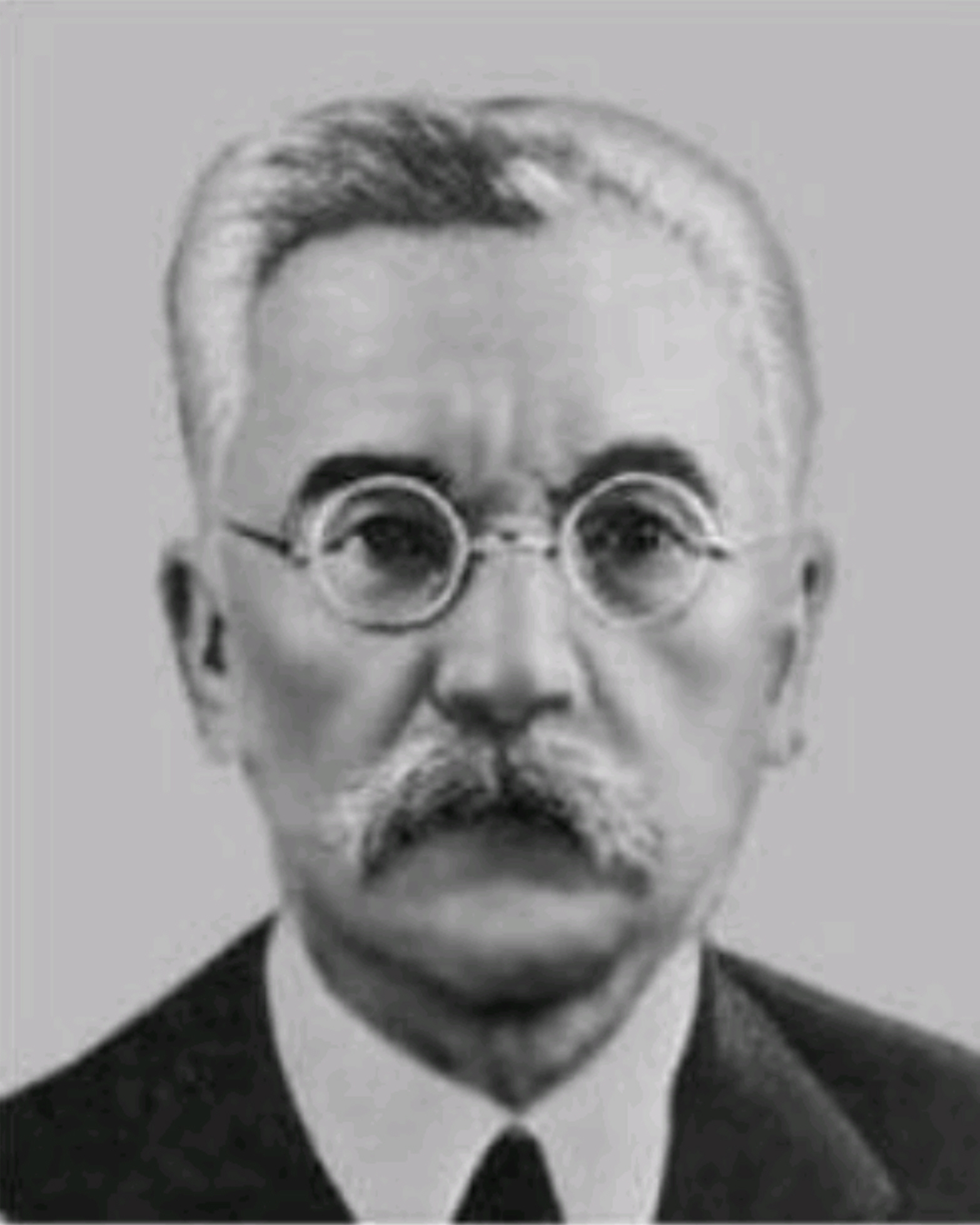
Aleksei Y. Chichibabin discovered various syntheses and reactions of pyridines

Albert Ladenburg investigated the reactions of pyridine and the preparation of its derivatives. In 1899, he published the reaction of pyridine with iodoethane at 290 °C in a sealed ampoule, in which he obtained, among other products, 4-ethylpyridine. A key figure in pyridine research was Alexei Yevgenyevich Chichibabin. He first prepared 2-benzylpyridine and 4-benzylpyridine by alkylating pyridine with benzyl halides at high temperatures. He also prepared 3-benzylpyridine by reducing 3-benzoylpyridine with hydroiodic acid. A milestone in this field was the development of the Chichibabin pyridine synthesis named after him, which he first published around 1905. In this reaction, the pyridine ring is constructed from ammonia and aldehydes; depending on the aldehydes used, various substituted derivatives can be obtained. With the Chichibabin reaction, also named after him and first published in 1914, pyridine can be reacted with sodium amide to give 2-aminopyridine as well as pyridine derivatives analogous to 2-amino compounds.

The biological significance of pyridines was discovered in the 1930s. This included the function of nicotinamide adenine dinucleotide (NAD) and its phosphate (nicotinamide adenine dinucleotide phosphate) as carriers of hydrogen atoms in biological systems. It was also discovered at that time that a deficiency of nicotinic acid (vitamin B_{3}, the precursor of NAD and NADP) was responsible for the disease pellagra. This disease was widespread at the time, for example in the southern states of the USA. Around the same period, it was discovered that pyridoxal phosphate and related compounds (vitamin B6) are essential nutrients and serve as cofactors for many enzymes.

== Major classes of substituted pyridines ==
=== Alkylpyridines ===
The three isomeric picolines contain one methyl group. Like the parent pyridine, they are colorless liquids, toxic and flammable, with a strong and sometimes unpleasant odor. They are miscible with water and common organic solvents. The lutidines are dimethylpyridine derivatives. Six isomers exist. They are also liquids with properties similar to those of the picolines. Collidines are trimethyl derivatives of pyridine, the most important of which is 2,4,6-collidine, which likewise exhibits properties similar to those of other methylpyridine compounds. 5-Ethyl-2-methylpyridine is relatively abundant since it arises from the condensation of ammonia and acetaldehyde.

=== Aminopyridines ===
2-Aminopyridine, 3-aminopyridine, and 4-aminopyridine are colorless solids. The more common 2-derivative is obtained by treating pyridine with sodium amide, the so-called Chichibabin reaction. It is a precursor to piroxicam, tenoxicam, sulfapyridine, tripelennamine, and other commercial bioactive compounds. The 3- and 4-aminopyridines are produced from the corresponding carboxamides by the Hofmann rearrangement. All three isomers are versatile intermediates via diazotization.

=== Hydroxypyridines ===
2-Hydroxypyridine and 4-hydroxypyridine exist in equilibrium with their more dominant tautomers 2-pyridone and 4-pyridone. 3-Pyridinol is not subject to that equilibrium: it behaves like phenol. All of these compounds exhibit extensive reactivity associated with the oxygen site. From the 2-, 3-, and 4-pyridone/pyridinols, the following commercial drugs are prepared: amphenidone, pyridostigmine bromide, and pericyazine, respectively.

=== Halogenated pyridines ===
Monohalogenated of pyridines are colorless materials, the fluorides, chlorides, and bromides being liquids. The moniodopyridines are solids. 2-Chloropyridine, obtained by direct reaction of pyridine with chlorine, is of considerable commercial significance. The fluoropyridine and iodopyridines are prepared via the diazotization of the corresponding aminopyridines. A variety of di-, tri-, tetra-, and pentahalopyridines are known, including heterohalides such a fluoroiodopyridines.

=== Pyridine carboxylic acids ===
Pyridine-2-carboxylic acid, pyridine-3-carboxylic acid, and pyridine-4-carboxylic acid are well established. They are colorless solids. The 3-isomer, also known as [nicotinic acid, is related to vitamin B6. They are typically produced commercially by oxidation of the corresponding methylpyridines.

=== Vinylpyridines ===
Vinyl-substituted pyridines, in particular 2-vinylpyridine, 4-vinylpyridine, and 2-methyl-5-vinylpyridine, are monomers used in the production of various polymers.

=== Ring-fused pyridines ===
Benzopyridine, quinoline, is a component of coal tars. It and its derivatives find many uses. Dibenzopyridines are also well known, the symmetrical version being acridine.

== Aromaticity ==
Pyridine rings (here shown using the parent compound as an example) are planar and aromatic

Pyridine is structurally closely related to benzene; formally, the two compounds can be interconverted by replacing a CH group with a nitrogen atom. Accordingly, pyridines possess six delocalized electrons analogous to benzene derivatives and satisfy the Hückel rule, that is, they are aromatic. The π electrons in pyridine are strongly delocalized. Overall, pyridine is less aromatic than benzene, but the difference is not very pronounced compared with other analogues such as phosphabenzole. Owing to the relatively strong aromaticity of the pyridine ring, the substitution pattern of derived compounds has only a minor influence on the aromatic character, similar to benzene.

== Nomenclature ==
Pyridine is a trivial name, but it has been adopted into the systematic nomenclature of derived compounds. Pyridine can occur as a substituent when another moiety of a complex compound constitutes the parent system. In such cases, the substituent is designated as pyridyl and preceded by a number indicating the atom through which the pyridine ring is bonded, for example 3-pyridyl.

Pyridine rings fused to benzene are generally not referred to as pyridines; instead, systematic trivial names are used. The benzopyridines are referred to as quinolines or isoquinolines, depending on the ring arrangement.

== Occurrence and biological significance ==
=== Vitamins ===
Nicotinic acid / vitamin B_{3} (left); pyridoxal phosphate / vitamin B_{6} (right)

Compounds of vitamin B6 contain a pyridine ring. The actual active compound is pyridoxal phosphate. However, pyridoxal as well as pyridoxine, pyridoxamine, and their phosphates can readily be converted into pyridoxal phosphate. Consequently, all six compounds are assigned to the vitamin B_{6} group. In humans, pyridoxal phosphate acts as a cofactor in a very large number of biological processes, including approximately 140 known enzymatic reactions. About 4% of all cellular enzymes require pyridoxal phosphate as a cofactor. Vitamin B_{6} must be obtained from the diet and is found in substantial amounts in both animal and plant foods. Animal sources include fish, liver, and other offal. Plant sources include potatoes, nuts, avocados, and bananas. In plant foods, the vitamin B_{6} precursor pyridoxine-5'-glucoside predominates. The principal function of pyridoxal phosphate in these reactions is the stabilization of negative charges in amino compounds. Such reactions include transaminations, decarboxylations, as well as various substitution reactions and elimination reactions.

Nicotinamide adenine dinucleotide (NAD) is likewise a cofactor and is essential for many redox reactions in biological systems. These include the degradation of glucose to pyruvic acid during glycolysis. NAD is also required for the citrate cycle. In addition, it acts as a regulator of transcription factors, for example in the circadian rhythm.

=== Alkaloids ===
Alkaloids containing a pyridine unit (pyridine alkaloids) occur frequently in insects, amphibians, and marine animals, as well as widely in plants. Many representatives occur in Virginian tobacco (Nicotiana tabacum). These include the principal alkaloid nicotine, as well as nornicotine, anabasine, and anatabine. Other compounds of this group are found in cordworms. Anabaseine occurs in the genus Paranemertes. In Amphiporus angulatus, 2,3'-bipyridine is found, as well as the main component nemertelline, which consists of four pyridine units. Pyridine alkaloids also occur in the genus fire ants (Solenopsis), including the red fire ant (Solenopsis invicta). These include, for example, 2-methyl-6-undecylpyridine and 2-methyl-6-tridecylpyridine, as well as related compounds with unsaturated side chains. The venom in the skin of the three-striped treehopper (Epipedobates tricolor) contains the pyridine alkaloid epibatidine.

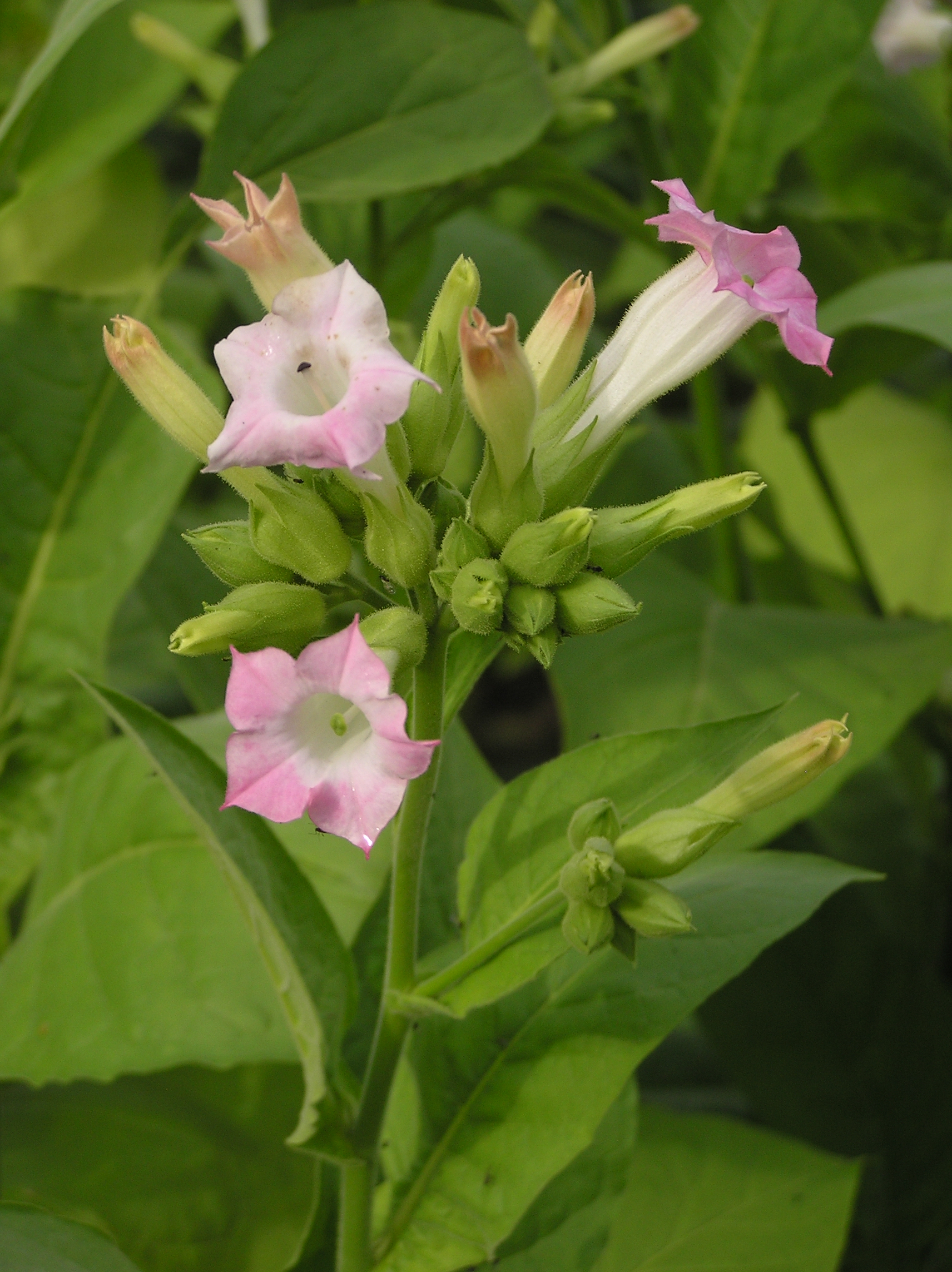
Tobacco plant

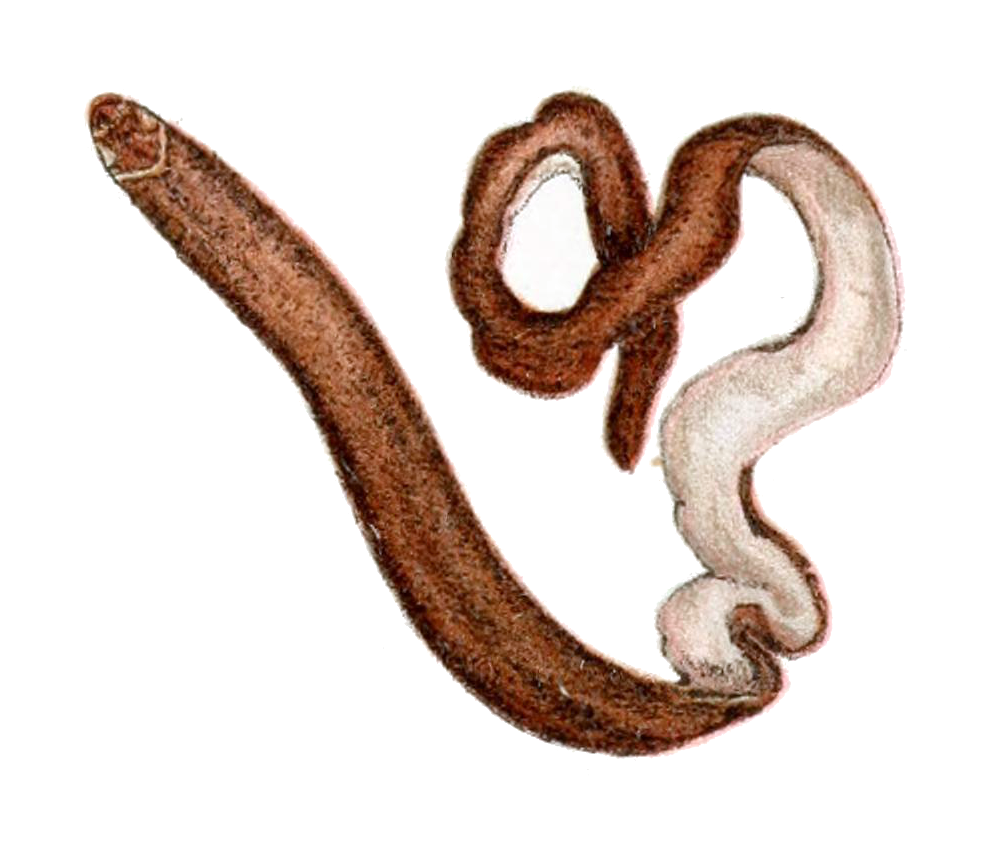
Amphiporus anglulatus

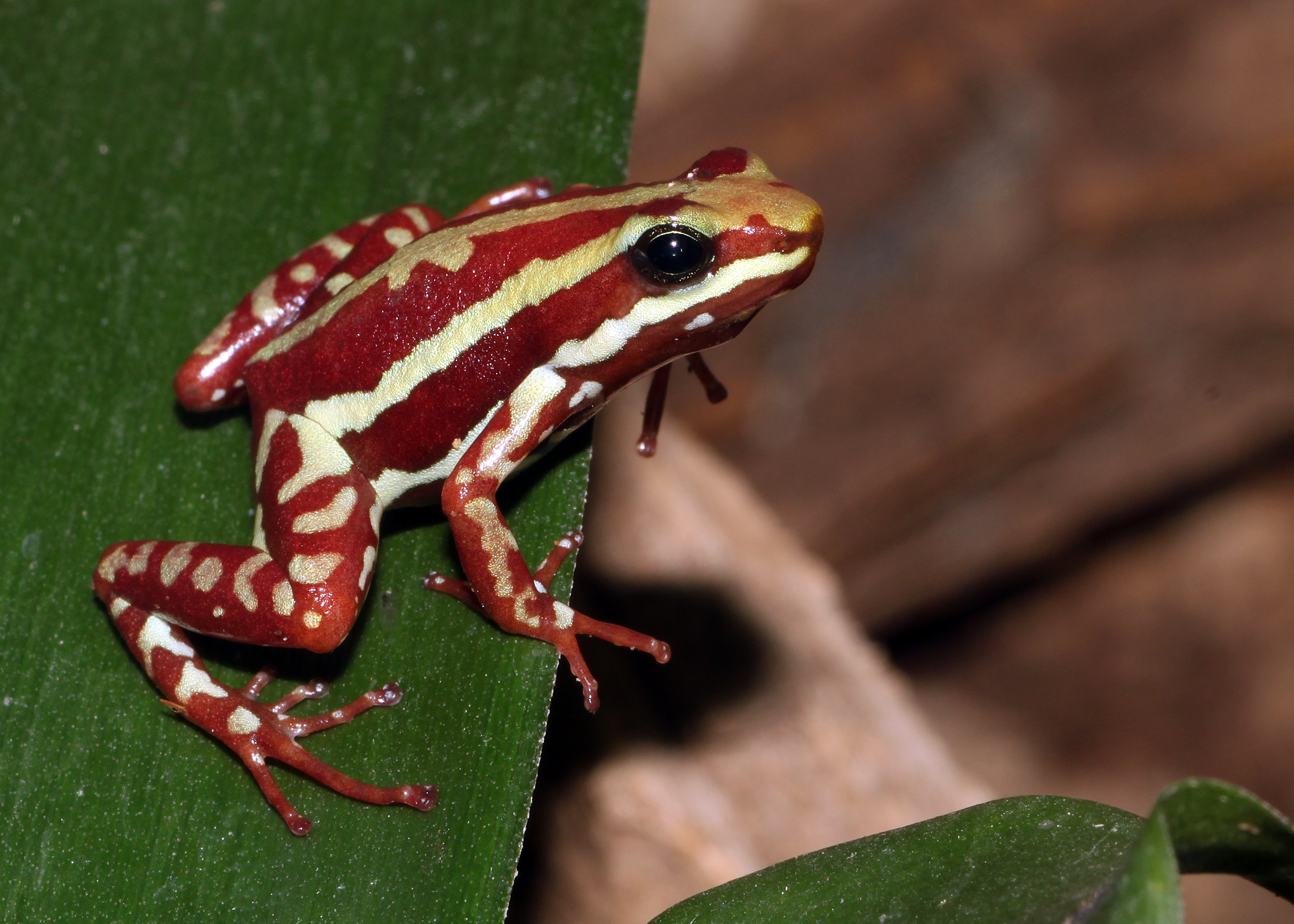
Phantasmal poison frog

Nicotine

Nemertelline

Epibatidine

== Biosynthesis ==
The biosynthetic pathways leading to pyridines originate from amino acids. In bacteria, nicotinamide adenine dinucleotide is synthesized via the aspartate pathway. The pyridine ring is initially formed as quinolinic acid from aspartic acid and glyceraldehyde-3-phosphate. In mammals and fungi, quinolinic acid is generated during the degradation of tryptophan in the kynurenine pathway. In plants, particularly monocotyledons (e.g. rice), both pathways occur. Dicotyledonous plants (e.g. thale cress) possess only the aspartate pathway. Nicotine and related alkaloids in Virginian tobacco are likewise formed via a branch of the NAD biosynthetic pathway.

Pyridoxal phosphate and the related vitamin B6 compounds are also synthesized via two distinct biosynthetic pathways. In Escherichia coli and some other bacteria, biosynthesis begins from deoxyxylulose 5-phosphate, which condenses with 1-amino-3-hydroxyacetone phosphate to form pyridoxine phosphate. The second biosynthetic pathway occurs in all kingdoms of life. In this route, ribose-5-phosphate, glutamine, and glyceraldehyde-3-phosphate condense directly to yield pyridoxal phosphate.

== Production ==
=== Chichibabin synthesis ===
In the Chichibabin pyridine synthesis, one molecule of ammonia condenses with three aldehyde molecules. Depending on the structure of the aldehydes employed, different substituted pyridines are obtained. Instead of ammonia, a synthesis equivalent such as ammonium acetate is often used. The reaction is conducted at high temperatures, either in aqueous solution in a sealed ampoule or by passing the gaseous reactants over a solid catalyst (for example aluminum oxide).

Chichibabin synthesis of a pyridine from three aldehyde molecules and ammonia, using aluminum oxide as a catalyst

The reaction often affords a mixture of products comprising various pyridines as well as quinolines, isoquinolines, and nitrogen-free compounds. However, the outcome can be controlled to a limited extent by appropriate choice of reaction conditions and catalysts. For example, three molecules of acetaldehyde and one molecule of ammonia predominantly yield picolines. The results can be improved by using ammonia or its equivalent in excess.

=== Hantzsch pyridine synthesis ===
The Hantzsch dihydropyridine synthesis employs two molecules of a 1,3-dicarbonyl compound (for example ethyl acetoacetate), together with an aldehyde and one molecule of ammonia. These components condense to form a symmetrical 1,4-dihydropyridine derivative, which undergoes aromatization by oxidation to yield a pyridine. A wide range of oxidizing agents is suitable for this final oxidation step; in some cases, exposure of the intermediate to air is sufficient. Alternatively, activated carbon with adsorbed oxygen or catalysts such as palladium or the enzyme laccase can be used to promote air oxidation.

A one-pot reaction for pyridine synthesis based on the Hantzsch reaction starts from acetoacetic ester and an aldehyde. The reaction is performed under microwaves and in the presence of bentonite as an acidic catalyst. Ammonium nitrate serves both as an ammonia equivalent and as an oxidizing agent for the oxidation of the dihydropyridine intermediate. This method has been used as a basis for the combinatorial chemistry of pyridines to generate molecular libraries.

=== Kröhnke pyridine synthesis ===
In the Kröhnke pyridine synthesis, an N-pyridine-substituted methyl ketone is used as the reactant. This compound enters the keto-enol equilibrium and reacts with an enone via a Michael addition. A 1,5-dicarbonyl compound is formed, one carbonyl group of which is replaced by ammonia (or a synthesis equivalent) to form an imine. This intermediate subsequently cyclizes to give a pyridine. The reaction is named after Fritz Kröhnke, who developed it for the preparation of 2,4,6-triarylpyridines and published it in 1961.

=== Cobalt-catalyzed routes ===
Related to the nickel-catalyzed alkyne trimerization, several methods have been developed using organocobalt compounds as catalysts. The organic precursors include acetonitrile, acetylene, and acrylonitrile.

=== Further synthesis methods ===
Pyridines can also be prepared via a Mannich reaction. The products are β-aminoketones (Mannich bases). If the hydrochloride of such a base is reacted with an aldehyde and ammonium acetate, a correspondingly substituted pyridine is obtained.

In the Bohlmann-Rahtz synthesis, an enamine is first added to an alkynone. A pyridine is then formed by intramolecular condensation reaction and dehydration between the ketone and the amino group. Under suitable conditions, the enamino ester can be generated in situ. For this purpose, the alkynone can be reacted with ammonium acetate, a keto ester, and an acidic catalyst such as acetic acid or zinc bromide.

== Reactions ==
Pyridines react as bases; protonation yields pyridinium ions

=== Basicity ===
Pyridines are Bronsted base and Lewis bases. The pKa values of their protonated forms are between 9.5 and 15.5. Comparatively strong bases include 2,3-diaminopyridine (pK_{S} value of the protonated form: 15.26) and 2,4,6-collidine (15.0). Rather weak bases include 3-chloropyridine (9.56) and 2-methoxypyridine (9.94). For the base pyridine itself, the value of 12.53 lies in the middle of this range. The pK_{S} values are similar for protonated 2-methylpyridine (13.28) and 2,2'-bipyridine (12.27). Pyridine is significantly less basic than the structurally related but saturated piperidine.

=== Reactions of substituents ===
In addition to the reactions of pyridinenitrogen, substituted pyridines can react at the CH sites and at the substituents. The survey below emphasizes the latter, being organized in parallel to the principal substituents.

- Alkylpyridines: The methyl group in picolines (methylpyridines) are reactive. 2-Picoline condenses with formaldehyde to give vinylpyridine, a comonomer in specialty polymers. All picolines undergo oxyamination to the nitriles as well as oxidation to the pyridine carboxaldehydes and carboxylic acids. Selenium dioxide converts picolines to the aldehydes. The methyl group can also be selectively chlorinated by free-radical conditions. One such derivative is 2-chloromethylpyridine. The methyl group is also more acidic, allowing formation of lithiated derivatives:

CH_{3}C_{5}H_{4}N + C_{4}H_{9}Li → LiCH_{2}C_{5}H_{4}N + C_{4}H_{10}

- Aminopyridines: 2-, 3-, and 4-Aminopyridines are susceptible to diazotization, which provides access to many further derivatives, such as the halides. Tautomerizaton of the 2- and 4-aminopyridines is disfavored, unlike the corresponding pyridinols.
- Hydroxypyridines: A prominent reaction of 2-hydroxypyridine and 4-hydroxypyridine is their reversible tautomerization to the corresponding pyridones. Being electron rich compared to pyridine itself, the hydroxypyridines readily undergo halogenation. Whereas 3-hydroxypyrdine has phenol-like, the 2- and 4-isomers react with halogenating agents resulting in net halide displacement of OH.
- Halopyridines: The halides in halopyridines are more easily displaced by nucleophiles than ordinary aryl halides. For example, 2-fluoropyridine reacts many primary and secondary amines with loss of HF. Some undergo copper-catalyzed Finkelstein reactions. Bromopyridines form Grignard reagents. 2-Bromopyridine is a convenient precursor to 2-lithiopyridine.
- Pyridine carboxylic acids: The pyridine carboxylic acids are more acidic than benzoic acid. They undergo reactions ordinarily associated with carboxylic acids, i.e. esterification, amide formation, acid chloride formation.
- Vinylpyridines: The dominant reaction of 2-vinylpyridine is its copolymerization with styrene and butadiene for the production of rubber tires.

== Use ==
=== Chemical laboratories and industry ===
Picolines are used as solvents and as intermediates in the synthesis of other compounds. For example, 2-vinylpyridine is produced from 2-picoline, and nicotinic acid is produced from 3-picoline. Lutidines and 2,4,6-collidine are also occasionally used as solvents, bases, and intermediates in pharmaceutical synthesis.

=== Medicine ===
Nitrogen heterocycles in general, and pyridines in particular, are widely used structural motifs in pharmaceuticals. In a study published in 2021, the structures of all pharmaceuticals approved by the Food and Drug Administration in the United States were analyzed with respect to nitrogen heterocycles. Sixty-two of these compounds contained a pyridine unit, making pyridines the second most common nitrogen heterocycles after piperidines. Most pyridine rings were mono- or disubstituted, with substituents in the 2-position occurring most frequently. Pyridine-containing pharmaceuticals include a number of structurally very similar antihistamines, such as chlorphenamine and brompheniramine.

Proton pump inhibitors such as pantoprazole contain a pyridine ring as an important structural element. These active substances are prodrugs that, in addition to the pyridine ring, contain a sulfoxide and a benzimidazole unit. The actual active species is a cyclic sulfenamide. To generate this species, the benzimidazole moiety must be activated by protonation, whereas the pyridine must be deprotonated so that it can act as a nucleophile. Consequently, substituents that modulate the PKs values of the nitrogen atoms or enhance the nucleophilicity of the pyridine nitrogen are of crucial importance. In addition to pantoprazole, this class of drugs includes omeprazole, lansoprazole, and rabeprazole.

=== Flavoring agents ===
A large number of pyridine compounds are approved as flavoring agents in the EU. These include the three isomeric picolines and several lutidines. Selected representatives are listed in the following table.

Compound	FL number	Source	Compound	FL number	Source
2-Picoline	14.134		4-Acetylpyridin	14.089	
3-Picoline	14.135		2-Butylpyridin	14.092	
4-Picoline	14.136		3-Butylpyridin	14.093	
2,3-Lutidine	14.103		2-Ethylpyridin	14.115	
2,4-Lutidine	14.104		2-Hexylpyridin	14.117	
3,4-Lutidine	14.105		2-Isopropylpyridine	14.124	
3,5-Lutidine	14.106		3-Pentylpyridine	14.140	
2,4,6-Collidine	14.150		2-Hydroxypyridine	14.118	
