= C6H7N =

The molecular formula C_{6}H_{7}N (molar mass: 93.12 g/mol, exact mass: 93.0578 u) may refer to:

- Aniline
- Azepine
- Methylpyridines (picolines)
  - 2-Methylpyridine
  - 3-Methylpyridine
  - 4-Methylpyridine
