= C7H7N =

The molecular formula C_{7}H_{7}N (molar mass: 105.13 g/mol, exact mass: 105.0578 u) may refer to:

- Azocine
- Vinylpyridines
  - 2-Vinylpyridine
  - 3-Vinylpyridine
  - 4-Vinylpyridine
