= C8H5NO6 =

The molecular formula C_{8}H_{5}NO_{6} may refer to:

- Berberonic acid
- Collidinic acid
- 3-Nitrophthalic acid
- 4-Nitrophthalic acid
- 5-Nitroisophthalic acid
- 4-(Nitrooxy)carbonyl benzoic acid
