= C20H14N4 =

The molecular formula C_{20}H_{14}N_{4} (molar mass: 310.35 g/mol, exact mass: 310.1218 u) may refer to:

- Porphine, or porphin
- Nemertelline
