= Anionic addition polymerization =

Form of addition polymerization initiated with anions

IUPAC definition

anionic polymerization: An ionic polymerization in which the kinetic-chain carriers are anions.

In polymer chemistry, anionic addition polymerization is a form of chain-growth polymerization or addition polymerization that involves the polymerization of monomers initiated with anions. The type of reaction has many manifestations, but traditionally vinyl monomers are used. Often anionic polymerization involves living polymerizations, which allows control of structure and composition.

== History ==
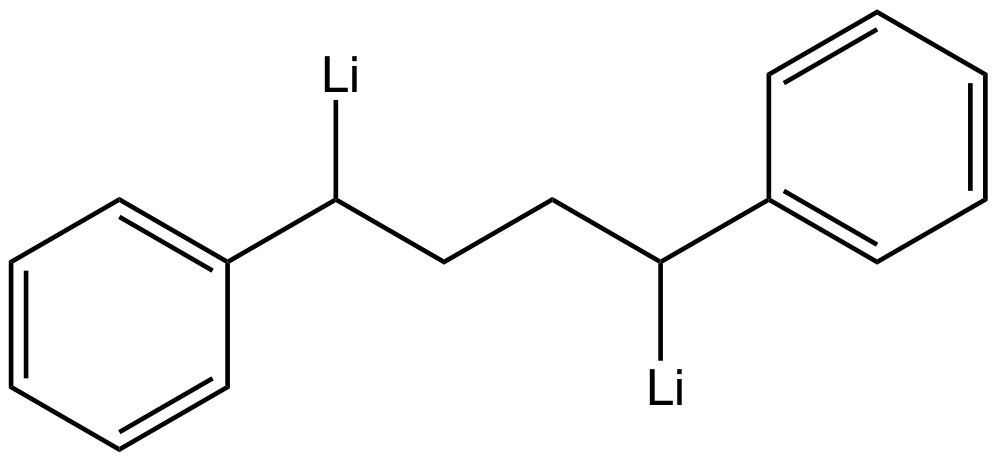
Product of the reductive coupling of styrene with lithium, 1,4-dilithio-1,4-diphenylbutane. In the original work, Szwarc studied the analogous disodium compound.

As early as 1936, Karl Ziegler proposed that anionic polymerization of styrene and butadiene by consecutive addition of monomer to an alkyl lithium initiator occurred without chain transfer or termination. Twenty years later, living polymerization was demonstrated by Michael Szwarc and coworkers. In one of the breakthrough events in the field of polymer science, Szwarc elucidated that electron transfer occurred from radical anion sodium naphthalene to styrene. The results in the formation of an organosodium species, which rapidly added styrene to form a "two – ended living polymer." An important aspect of his work, Szwarc employed the aprotic solvent tetrahydrofuran. Being a physical chemist, Szwarc elucidated the kinetics and the thermodynamics of the process in considerable detail. At the same time, he explored the structure property relationship of the various ion pairs and radical ions involved. This work provided the foundations for the synthesis of polymers with improved control over molecular weight, molecular weight distribution, and the architecture.

The use of alkali metals to initiate polymerization of 1,3-dienes led to the discovery by Stavely and co-workers at Firestone Tire and Rubber company of cis-1,4-polyisoprene. This sparked the development of commercial anionic polymerization processes that utilize alkyllithium initiators.

Roderic Quirk won the 2019 Charles Goodyear Medal in recognition of his contributions to anionic polymerization technology. He was introduced to the subject while working in a Phillips Petroleum lab with Henry Hsieh.

== Monomer characteristics ==
Two broad classes of monomers are susceptible to anionic polymerization.

Vinyl monomers have the formula CH_{2}=CHR, the most important are styrene (R = C_{6}H_{5}), butadiene (R = CH=CH_{2}), and isoprene (R = C(Me)=CH_{2}). A second major class of monomers are acrylate esters, such as acrylonitrile, methacrylate, cyanoacrylate, and acrolein. Other vinyl monomers include vinylpyridine, vinyl sulfone, vinyl sulfoxide, vinyl silanes.

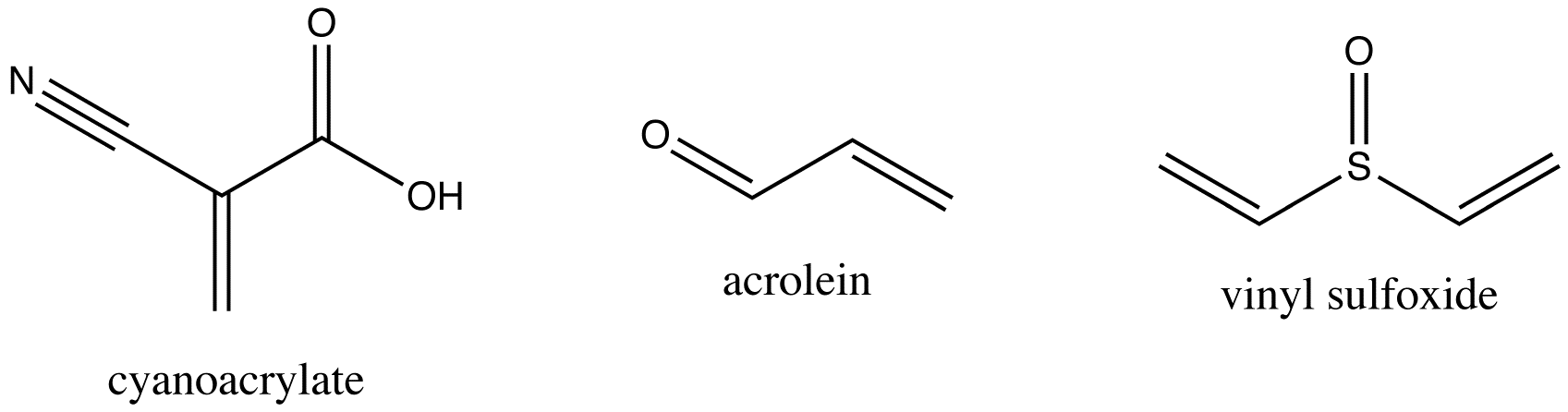
Examples of polar monomers

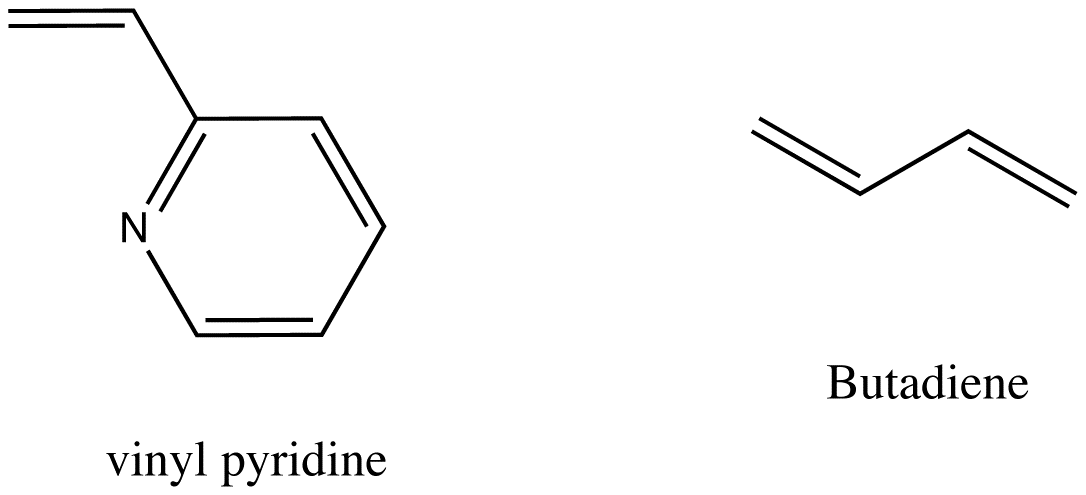
Examples of vinyl monomers

=== Cyclic monomers ===
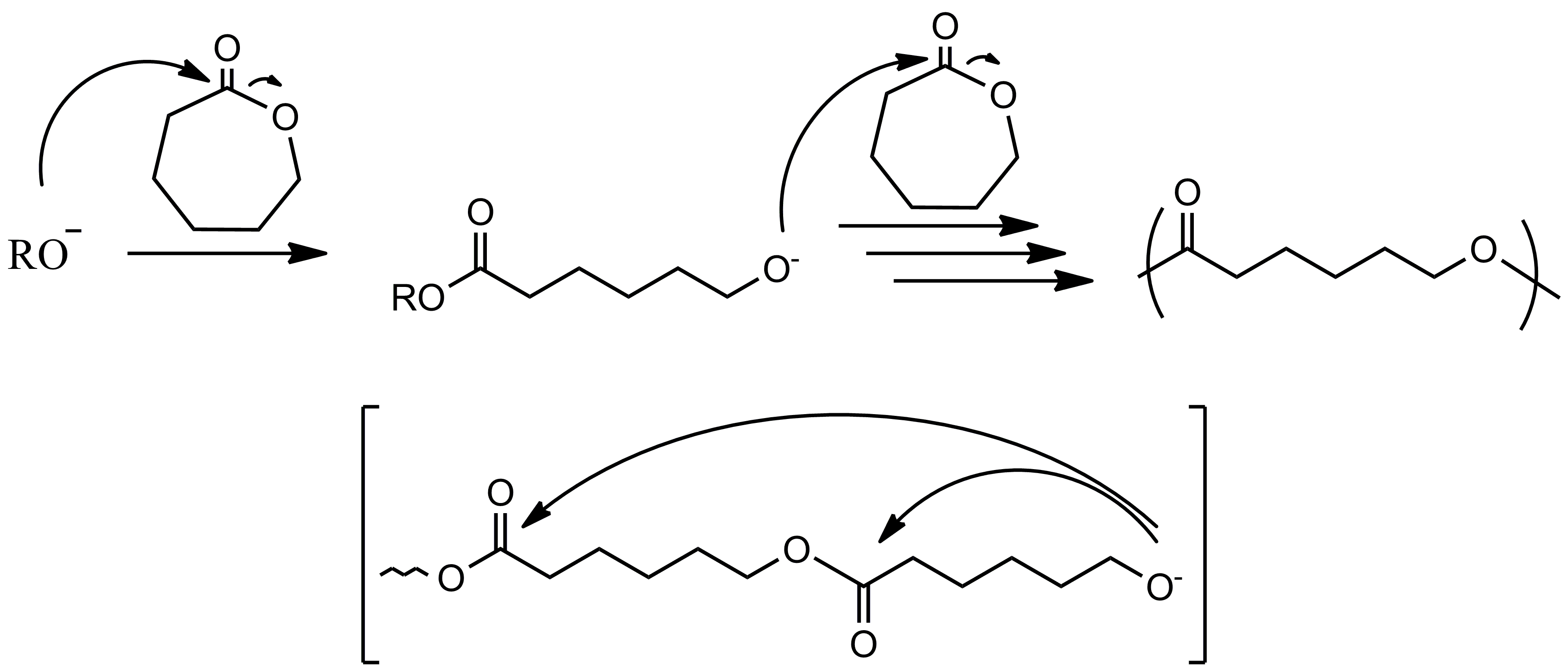
The anionic ring-opening polymerization of ε-caprolactone, initiated by alkoxide

Hexamethylcyclotrisiloxane is a cyclic monomer that is susceptible to anionic polymerization to siloxane polymers.

Many cyclic compounds are susceptible to ring-opening polymerization. Epoxides, cyclic trisiloxanes, some lactones, lactides, cyclic carbonates, and amino acid N-carboxyanhydrides.

In order for polymerization to occur with vinyl monomers, the substituents on the double bond must be able to stabilize a negative charge. Stabilization occurs through delocalization of the negative charge. Because of the nature of the carbanion propagating center, substituents that react with bases or nucleophiles either must not be present or be protected.

== Initiation ==
Initiators are selected based on the reactivity of the monomers. Highly electrophilic monomers such as cyanoacrylates require only weakly nucleophilic initiators, such as amines, phosphines, or even halides. Less reactive monomers such as styrene require powerful nucleophiles such as butyl lithium. Reactions of intermediate strength are used for monomers of intermediate reactivity such as vinylpyridine.

The solvents used in anionic addition polymerizations are determined by the reactivity of both the initiator and nature of the propagating chain end. Anionic species with low reactivity, such as heterocyclic monomers, can use a wide range of solvents.

=== Initiation by electron transfer ===
Initiation of styrene polymerization with sodium naphthalene proceeds by electron transfer from the naphthalene radical anion to the monomer. The resulting radical dimerizes to give a disodium compound, which then functions as the initiator. Polar solvents are necessary for this type of initiation both for stability of the anion-radical and to solvate the cation species formed. The anion-radical can then transfer an electron to the monomer. Initiation can also involve the transfer of an electron from the alkali metal to the monomer to form an anion-radical. Initiation occurs on the surface of the metal, with the reversible transfer of an electron to the adsorbed monomer.

=== Initiation by strong anions ===
Nucleophilic initiators include covalent or ionic metal amides, alkoxides, hydroxides, cyanides, phosphines, amines and organometallic compounds (alkyllithium compounds and Grignard reagents). The initiation process involves the addition of a neutral (B:) or negative (:B^{−}) nucleophile to the monomer. The most commercially useful of these initiators has been the alkyllithium initiators. They are primarily used for the polymerization of styrenes and dienes.

Monomers activated by strong electronegative groups may be initiated even by weak anionic or neutral nucleophiles (i.e. amines, phosphines). Most prominent example is the curing of cyanoacrylate, which constitutes the basis for superglue. Here, only traces of basic impurities are sufficient to induce an anionic addition polymerization or zwitterionic addition polymerization, respectively.

== Propagation ==
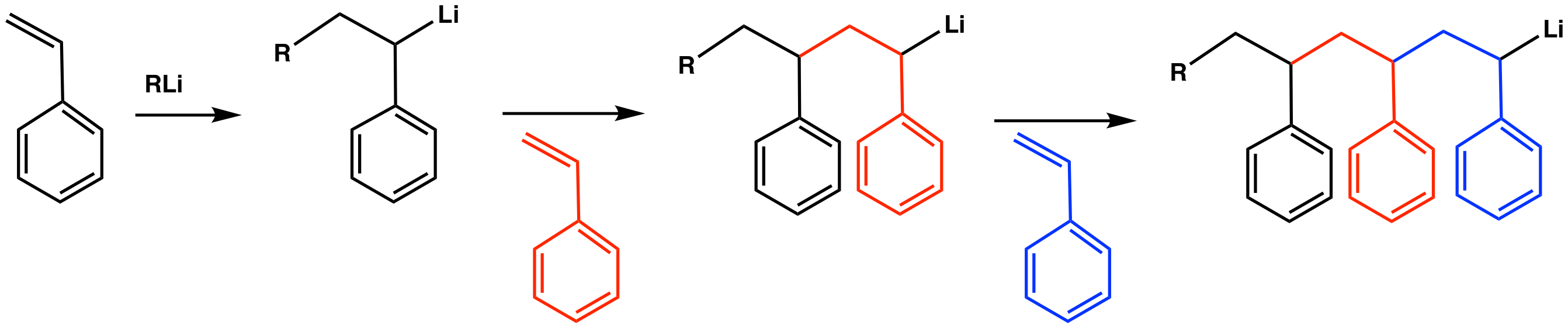
Organolithium-initiated polymerization of styrene

Propagation in anionic addition polymerization results in the complete consumption of monomer. This stage is often fast, even at low temperatures.

== Living anionic polymerization ==
Living anionic polymerization is a living polymerization technique involving an anionic propagating species.

Living anionic polymerization was demonstrated by Szwarc and co workers in 1956. Their initial work was based on the polymerization of styrene and dienes. One of the remarkable features of living anionic polymerization is that the mechanism involves no formal termination step. In the absence of impurities, the carbanion would still be active and capable of adding another monomer. The chains will remain active indefinitely unless there is inadvertent or deliberate termination or chain transfer. This gave rise to two important consequences:

1. The number average molecular weight, M_{n}, of the polymer resulting from such a system could be calculated by the amount of consumed monomer and the initiator used for the polymerization, as the degree of polymerization would be the ratio of the moles of the monomer consumed to the moles of the initiator added.
  $M_n = M_o \frac {[\mbox{M}]_o} {[\mbox{I}]}$, where M_{o} = formula weight of the repeating unit, [M]_{o} = initial concentration of the monomer, and [I] = concentration of the initiator.
2. All the chains are initiated at roughly the same time. The final result is that the polymer synthesis can be done in a much more controlled manner in terms of the molecular weight and molecular weight distribution (Poisson distribution).

The following experimental criteria have been proposed as a tool for identifying a system as living polymerization system.

- Polymerization until the monomer is completely consumed and until further monomer is added.
- Constant number of active centers or propagating species.
- Poisson distribution of molecular weight
- Chain end functionalization can be carried out quantitatively.

However, in practice, even in the absence of terminating agents, the concentration of the living anions will reduce with time due to a decay mechanism termed as spontaneous termination.

== Consequences of living polymerization ==
=== Block copolymers ===
Synthesis of block copolymers is one of the most important applications of living polymerization as it offers the best control over structure. The nucleophilicity of the resulting carbanion will govern the order of monomer addition, as the monomer forming the less nucleophilic propagating species may inhibit the addition of the more nucleophilic monomer onto the chain. An extension of the above concept is the formation of triblock copolymers where each step of such a sequence aims to prepare a block segment with predictable, known molecular weight and narrow molecular weight distribution without chain termination or transfer.

Sequential monomer addition is the dominant method, also this simple approach suffers some limitations. Moreover, this strategy, enables synthesis of linear block copolymer structures that are not accessible via sequential monomer addition. For common A-b-B structures, sequential block copolymerization gives access to well defined block copolymers only if the crossover reaction rate constant is significantly higher than the rate constant of the homopolymerization of the second monomer, i.e., k_{AA} >> k_{BB}.

=== End-group functionalization/termination ===
One of the remarkable features of living anionic polymerization is the absence of a formal termination step. In the absence of impurities, the carbanion would remain active, awaiting the addition of new monomer. Termination can occur through unintentional quenching by impurities, often present in trace amounts. Typical impurities include oxygen, carbon dioxide, or water. Termination intentionally allows the introduction of tailored end groups.

Living anionic polymerization allow the incorporation of functional end-groups, usually added to quench polymerization. End-groups that have been used in the functionalization of α-haloalkanes include hydroxide, -NH_{2}, -OH, -SH, -CHO,-COCH_{3}, -COOH, and epoxides.

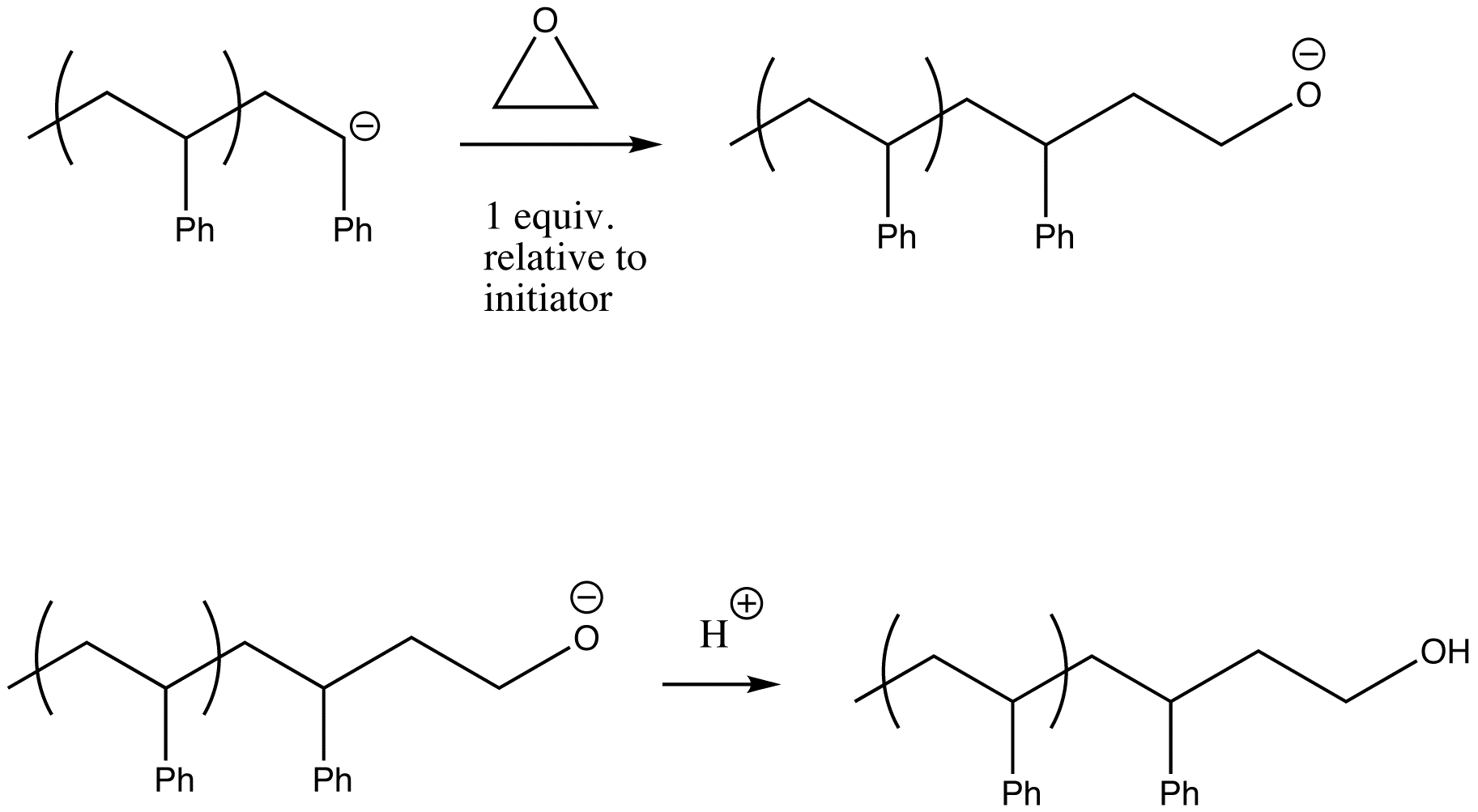
Addition of hydroxide group through an epoxide.

An alternative approach for functionalizing end-groups is to begin polymerization with a functional anionic initiator. In this case, the functional groups are protected since the ends of the anionic polymer chain is a strong base. This method leads to polymers with controlled molecular weights and narrow molecular weight distributions.

== Additional reading ==
- Cowie, J.; Arrighi, V. Polymers: Chemistry and Physics of Modern Materials; CRC Press: Boca Raton, FL, 2008.
- Hadjichristidis, N.; Iatrou, H.; Pitsikalis, P.; Mays, J. (2006). "Macromolecular architectures by living and controlled/living polymerizations". Prog. Polym. Sci. 31 (12): 1068–1132. doi:10.1016/j.progpolymsci.2006.07.002.
- Efstratiadis, V.; Tselikas, Y.; Hadjichristidis, N.; Li, J.; Yunan, W.; Mays, J. (1994). "Synthesis and characterization of poly(methyl methacrylate) star polymers". Polym Int. 4 (2): 171–179. doi:10.1002/pi.1994.210330208.
- Rempp, P.; Franta, E.; Herz, J. (1998). "Macromolecular Engineering by Anionic Methods". Polysiloxane Copolymers/Anionic Polymerization. Advances in Polymer Science. Vol. 4. pp. 145–173. doi:10.1007/BFb0025276. ISBN 978-3-540-18506-2. S2CID 92176703.
- Bellas, Vasilios; Rehahn, Matthias (2 July 2007). "Universal Methodology for Block Copolymer Synthesis". Macromolecular Rapid Communications. 28 (13): 1415–1421. doi:10.1002/marc.200700127. S2CID 96556942.
- Nikos Hadjichristidis; Akira Hirao, eds. (2015). Anionic Polymerization Principles, Practice, Strength, Consequences and Applications. Springer. ISBN 978-4-431-54186-8.
