= MPMD =

MPMD may refer to:

- Multiple programs, multiple datastreams, in computer architecture
- 2-Methylpentamethylenediamine, having the brand name "Dytek A", a colorless liquid
