= Roderic Quirk =

American chemist

Roderic Quirk is an Emeritus University of Akron professor noted for contributions to anionic polymerization technology that is used to produce butadiene, isoprene and styrene homopolymers and block copolymers.

== Education ==
Quirk completed a BS in Chemistry in 1963 at Rensselaer Polytechnic Institute. In 1967, he earned a doctorate in organic chemistry under advisor David Curtin at the University of Illinois. In 1969, he completed a postdoc at the University of Pittsburgh under Edward Arnett.

== Career ==
Quirk's first academic appointment began in 1969 at the University of Arkansas and continued until 1978. In the summer of 1974, Quirk worked at Phillips Petroleum in Henry Hsieh's anionic polymerization lab. In 1979, he took a senior research position at the Midland Macromolecular Institute. In 1983, Quirk joined the University of Akron.

== Notable Students ==
- Frederick Ignatz-Hoover - Eastman technology fellow and 9th editor of Rubber Chemistry and Technology

== Awards ==
- 1990 - Fellow of the Japan Society for Promotion of Science
- 2004 - George Stafford Whitby award of the Rubber Division of the American Chemical Society
- 2019 – Charles Goodyear Medal of the Rubber Division of the American Chemical Society
- 2019 – National Academy of Inventors
