= Henry Hsieh =

American scientist

Henry L. Hsieh was a Phillips Petroleum scientist known for contributions to polymerization chemistry, specifically anionic polymerization.

== Education ==
Hsieh was a native of Shanghai, China. He received his BS Chemistry at the University of Akron in 1954. He then went to Princeton, where he earned a MA in Chemistry in 1956, and a PhD in 1957 in Organic / Polymer chemistry.

== Career ==
After completing his doctoral work, he joined Phillips in 1957 as a research chemist in their rubber synthesis branch. He became an authority on polymerization chemistry, holding 135 patents and publishing more than 50 scientific articles. He was responsible for the development of Solprene synthetic rubbers, K-Resin plastic, Butarez CTL solid rocket fuel binder and Phil-ad VIII multi-grade motor oil additive. In 1974, future Goodyear Medal winner Roderic Quirk worked in Hsieh's anionic polymerization lab. Hsieh's most cited journal article is a review on the kinetics of alkyllithium initiated polymerization.

== Awards ==
- 1980 - Hsieh received a $12500 cash award under a Phillips Petroleum patent recognition program. Upon receiving the award Hsieh was quoted as saying "a discovery is really a series of accidents" and that "it just takes someone with a prepared mind to accept and catch that accident".
- 1991 - Inventor of the Year Award from the Oklahoma Bar Association's patent, trademark and copyright section
- 1998 - Melvin Mooney Distinguished Technology Award from Rubber Division of the ACS
