= 2,6-Dichloropyridine =

Names
- Preferred IUPAC name 2,6-Dichloropyridine

Identifiers
CAS Number	2402-78-0
3D model (JSmol)	Interactive image
ChEMBL	ChEMBL3561947
ChemSpider	16095
ECHA InfoCard	100.017.531
EC Number	219-282-3
PubChem CID	16989
UNII	WM26PC2SBW
CompTox Dashboard (EPA)	DTXSID2051895
- InChI: InChI=1S/C5H3Cl2N/c6-4-2-1-3-5(7)8-4/h1-3H Key: FILKGCRCWDMBKA-UHFFFAOYSA-N
- SMILES: C1=CC(=NC(=C1)Cl)Cl

Properties
Chemical formula	C_{5}H_{3}Cl_{2}N
Molar mass	147.99 g·mol^{−1}
Appearance	white solid
Density	1.665 g/cm^{3}
Melting point	86–89 °C (187–192 °F; 359–362 K)
Boiling point	211–212 °C (412–414 °F; 484–485 K)

Hazards
- GHS labelling
Pictograms	(GHS06: Toxic) (GHS07: Exclamation mark)
Signal word	Danger
Hazard statements	H301, H315, H319, H335
Precautionary statements	P261, P264, P270, P271, P280, P301+P310, P302+P352, P304+P340, P305+P351+P338, P312, P321, P330, P332+P313, P337+P313, P362, P403+P233, P405, P501
- Except where otherwise noted, data are given for materials in their standard state (at 25 °C [77 °F], 100 kPa). Infobox references

2,6-Dichloropyridine is a chloropyridine with the formula C_{5}H_{3}Cl_{2}N. A white solid, it is one of six isomers of dichloropyridine. It serves as a precursor to the antibiotic enoxacin, as well as the drug anpirtoline and the antifungal liranaftate.

== Synthesis ==
2,6-Dichoropyridine is produced by reaction of pyridine with chlorine. 2-Chloropyridine is an intermediate.

== Toxicity ==
The LD_{50} is 115 mg/kg (oral, mice).
