= Pentachloropyridine =

Names
- Other names Perchloropyridine

Identifiers
CAS Number	2176-62-7
3D model (JSmol)	Interactive image
ChEMBL	ChEMBLCHEMBL1872753
ChemSpider	15724
ECHA InfoCard	100.016.850
EC Number	218-535-5
PubChem CID	16584
UNII	6MM852KA6T
CompTox Dashboard (EPA)	DTXSID2022179
- InChI: InChI=1S/C5Cl5N/c6-1-2(7)4(9)11-5(10)3(1)8 Key: DNDPLEAVNVOOQZ-UHFFFAOYSA-N
- SMILES: C1(=C(C(=NC(=C1Cl)Cl)Cl)Cl)Cl

Properties
Chemical formula	C_{5}Cl_{5}N
Molar mass	251.31 g·mol^{−1}
Appearance	colorless solid
Melting point	124–126 °C (255–259 °F; 397–399 K)
Boiling point	279–280 °C (534–536 °F; 552–553 K)
Solubility	very soluble in benzene, ethanol, ligroin
log P	3.53

Hazards
- GHS labelling
Pictograms	(GHS07: Exclamation mark) (GHS08: Health hazard) (GHS09: Environmental hazard)
Signal word	Danger
Hazard statements	H302, H315, H317, H319, H334, H335, H410
Precautionary statements	P233, P260, P264, P264+P265, P270, P271, P272, P273, P280, P284, P301+P317, P302+P352, P304+P340, P305+P351+P338, P319, P321, P330, P333+P317, P337+P317, P342+P316, P362+P364, P391, P403, P403+P233, P405, P501
- Lethal dose or concentration (LD, LC)
LD_{50} (median dose)	235 mg/kg (mouse, ip)
- Except where otherwise noted, data are given for materials in their standard state (at 25 °C [77 °F], 100 kPa). Infobox references

Pentachloropyridine is the organochlorine compound with the formula C_{5}Cl_{5}N. It is the perchlorinated derivative of pyridine, a white solid.

The compound can be prepared by treating pyridine with chlorine or with phosphorus pentachloride. It reacts with potassium fluoride to give pentafluoropyridine. Zinc reduction gives 2,3,5,6-tetrachloropyridine, reflecting the heightened reactivity of the 4-chloro group. Many substituted derivatives are known.
