= 2-Methylglutaronitrile =

Names
- Preferred IUPAC name 2-Methylpentanedinitrile
- Other names 1,3-Dicyanobutane, α-Methylvalerodinitrile

Identifiers
CAS Number	4553-62-2
3D model (JSmol)	Interactive image
ChemSpider	19482
ECHA InfoCard	100.022.658
EC Number	224-923-5
MeSH	C480967
PubChem CID	20686
UNII	EJX3MSL725
CompTox Dashboard (EPA)	DTXSID4025612
- InChI: InChI=1S/C6H8N2/c1-6(5-8)3-2-4-7/h6H,2-3H2,1H3 Key: FPPLREPCQJZDAQ-UHFFFAOYSA-N
- SMILES: CC(CCC#N)C#N

Properties
Chemical formula	C_{6}H_{8}N_{2}
Molar mass	108.144 g·mol^{−1}
Appearance	colorless liquid
Density	0.9548 g/cm^{3}
Melting point	−45 °C (−49 °F; 228 K)
Boiling point	263 °C (505 °F; 536 K)
- Except where otherwise noted, data are given for materials in their standard state (at 25 °C [77 °F], 100 kPa). Infobox references

2-Methylglutaronitrile is the organic compound with the formula NCCH_{2}CH_{2}CH(CH_{3})CN. This dinitrile is obtained in the large-scale synthesis of adiponitrile. It is a colorless liquid with an unpleasant odor. It is the starting compound for the vitamin nicotinamide and for the diester dimethyl-2-methylglutarate and the ester amide methyl 5-(dimethylamino)-2-methyl-5-oxopentanoate, which are promoted as green solvents. 2-Methylglutaronitrile is chiral but is mainly encountered as the racemate. It is also used to make Dytek A.

== Occurrence and production ==
2-Methylglutaronitrile is a by-product of the production of adiponitrile, the precursor of hexamethylenediamine and adipic acid as building blocks for nylon 66.

Starting from 1,3-butadiene or a butadiene-rich C4-section (> 40% by volume) from a naphtha steamcracker in the first stage a mixture of pentenenitriles is obtained through hydrocyanation (using as catalyst Ni^{0}-phosphine [PR_{3}] or phosphite or phosphonite [P(OR)_{2}R]). The mixture contains mainly trans-3-pentenenitrile in addition to the isomers 2-methyl-2-butenenitrile, 4-pentenenitrile and 2-pentenenitrile.

1,3-Butsdien zu Pentennitrilen

The mixture of monoolefinic C5 mononitriles is isomerized to 3- and 4-pentenenitrile with a hydrocyanation catalyst and a Lewis acid (such as ZnCl_{2}). In the third step, the mixture is reacted with hydrogen cyanide to give a mixture of dinitriles which contains in addition to 2-methylglutaronitrile also adiponitrile and 2-ethylbutanedinitrile.

Umsetzung von Pentennitrilen zu Dinitrilen

2-Methylglutaronitrile can be separated by fractional distillation.

The 2-methylglutaronitrile-rich fraction has hitherto been combusted as an undesired by-product of adiponitrile production, having the typical composition of about 86 wt% 2-methylglutaronitrile, 11 wt% 2-succinonitrile and 3 wt% adiponitrile.

== Applications ==
2-methylglutaronitrile can be converted to 3-methylpyridine (β-picoline) by partial hydrogenation.

3-Methylpyridin aus 2-MGN

In addition to 3-methylpyridine, 3-methylpiperidine is obtained as a by-product from which further 3-methylpyridine can be obtained by dehydrogenation.

Ammonoxidation of 3-methylpyridine on transition metal contacts yields 3-cyanopyridine (nicotinonitrile) in yields of 95%.

Nicotinsäureamid aus 3-Methylpyridin

Hydrogenation of a solution of 2-methylglutaronitrile in ethanol in the presence of Raney cobalt at 15 bar and 100 °C yields 2-methylpentane-1,5-diamine.

2-Methylpentan-1,5-diamin aus 2-Methylglutaronitril

2-Methylpentanediamine can be converted to 3-methylpiperidine at 300 to 400 °C on a zeolite contact and then dehydrated on a palladium contact to 3-methylpyridine, which can be converted via nicotinonitrile into nicotinamide.

The racemic diamine can also be used for the preparation of specific polyamides and after reaction with phosgene to form 2-methylpentane diisocyanate as a reaction component in polyurethanes. Nitrilases regioselectively hydrolyze the ω-nitrile group in α, ω-dinitriles without detectable amide intermediate directly to the carboxyl group. 4-cyanopentanoic acid is formed in high yield.

4-Cyanopentansäure aus 2-Methylglutaronitril

The ammonium salt of 4-cyanopentanoic acid can be converted by catalytic hydrogenation in the presence of methylamine in 1,5-dimethyl-2-piperidone, an environmentally compatible solvent.

Synthese von 1,5-Dimethyl-2-piperidon

The hydrolysis of both nitrile groups of 2-methylglutaronitrile with e.g. 20% sodium hydroxide solution at 50 °C and subsequent acidification produces 2-methylglutaric acid.

2-Methylglutarsäure aus 2-Methylglutraronitril

Starting from 2-methylglutaronitrile the hydrolysis to 2-methylglutaric acid can also be accomplished via the 2-methylglutarimide obtained by heating a 2-methylglutaronitrile/water mixture to 275 °C in the presence of a titanium dioxide catalyst in yields of 94%.

2-MGN-Imid aus 2-Methylglutaronitril

Hydrolysis in the alkaline provides 2-methyl glutaric acid.

The reaction of 2-methylglutarimide with e.g. methanol (methanolysis) produces the diester dimethyl-2-methylglutarate in the presence of titanium dioxide or lanthanum oxide. It was commercialized as an environmentally friendly aprotic dipolar solvent under the name Rhodiasolv IRIS with the typical composition 87-89% dimethyl-2-methylglutarate, 9-11% dimethyl 2-ethylbutanedioate and 1-2% dimethyl hexanedioate as a substitute for acetone, dichloromethane, N-methylpyrrolidone and the like.

Diester aus 2-MGN-Imid

The ester mixture is very similar to so-called dibasic esters, which are commercially available as FlexiSolv DBE esters.

The diester can be selectively converted into a mixture of 1- or 5-substituted methyl ester amides with dimethylamine in methanol/sodium methoxide, which is used under the name Rhodiasolv Polarclean as formulation auxiliaries for crop protection preparations. The resulting ester amides are readily biodegradable and good solvents for a variety of different plant protection agents (such as insecticides or fungicides), also compared to the frequently used N-methylpyrrolidone, cyclohexanone or isophorone.

Other esteramides are derived, e. g. from 2-methylglutaronitrile which, after alkaline hydrolysis, is converted into 2-methylglutaric acid, cyclized with acetic anhydride to give 2-methylglutaric anhydride, reacted with dimethylamine to form the monoamide, reacted to an acid chloride with thionyl chloride and formed to an ester with more hydrophobic alcohols (like butanols or cyclohexanol).
