= Pentafluoropyridine =

Names
- IUPAC name 2,3,4,5,6-pentafluoropyridine
- Other names Perfluoropyridine

Identifiers
CAS Number	700-16-3
3D model (JSmol)	Interactive image
ChemSpider	62891
ECHA InfoCard	100.010.765
EC Number	211-839-9
PubChem CID	69690
CompTox Dashboard (EPA)	DTXSID70220258
- InChI: InChI=1S/C5F5N/c6-1-2(7)4(9)11-5(10)3(1)8 Key: XTGOWLIKIQLYRG-UHFFFAOYSA-N
- SMILES: C1(=C(C(=NC(=C1F)F)F)F)F

Properties
Chemical formula	C_{5}F_{5}N
Molar mass	169.054 g·mol^{−1}
Appearance	colorless liquid
Density	1.54 g·cm^{−3} (25 °C)
Melting point	23 °C (73 °F; 296 K)
Boiling point	84 °C (183 °F; 357 K)
Refractive index (n_{D})	1.3860

Hazards
- GHS labelling
Pictograms	(GHS02: Flammable) (GHS05: Corrosive) (GHS07: Exclamation mark)
Signal word	Danger
Hazard statements	H226, H302, H312, H314, H332
Precautionary statements	P210, P233, P240, P241, P242, P243, P260, P264, P270, P271, P280, P301+P317, P301+P330+P331, P302+P352, P302+P361+P354, P303+P361+P353, P304+P340, P305+P354+P338, P316, P317, P321, P330, P362+P364, P363, P370+P378, P403+P235, P405, P501
- Except where otherwise noted, data are given for materials in their standard state (at 25 °C [77 °F], 100 kPa). Infobox references

Pentafluoropyridine is the organofluorine compound with the formula C_{5}F_{5}N. It is the perfluorinated derivative of pyridine, a colorless liquid. It is notable for its susceptibility to substitution of the 4-fluoro group, e.g. by amines.

The compound can be prepared by treating pentachloropyridine with potassium fluoride. The conversion conforms to the pattern of easy substitution of C–Cl bonds in pyridines.
