= Pyridinetricarboxylic acid =

Pyridinetricarboxylic acid is a group of organic compounds which are tricarboxylic derivatives of pyridine. Pyridinetricarboxylic acid comes in several isomers:

- 2,3,4-Pyridinetricarboxylic acid
- 2,3,5-Pyridinetricarboxylic acid
- 2,3,6-Pyridinetricarboxylic acid
- Berberonic acid (2,4,5-Pyridinetricarboxylic acid)
- Collidinic acid (2,4,6-Pyridinetricarboxylic acid)
- 3,4,5-Pyridinetricarboxylic acid

Common Name				Berberonic acid	Collidinic acid	
Systematic Name	2,3,4-Pyridinetricarboxylic acid	2,3,5-Pyridinetricarboxylic acid	2,3,6-Pyridinetricarboxylic acid	2,4,5-Pyridinetricarboxylic acid	2,4,6-Pyridinetricarboxylic acid	3,4,5-Pyridinetricarboxylic acid
Structural Formula						
CAS Registry Number	632-95-1	116668-76-9		490-28-8	536-20-9	632-94-0

All isomers share the molecular weight 211,13 g/mol and the chemical formula C_{8}H_{5}NO_{6}.
