= Dichloropyridine =

Chemical compounds

Dichloropyridines are organic compounds with the formula Cl_{2}C_{5}H_{3}N, consisting of a pyridine ring substituted with two chlorides. Six isomers are known. They are white or colorless, most are solids at room temperature.

Isomers of Dichloropyridine
Name	Registry number	melting point (°C)
2,3-Dichloropyridine	2402-77-9	64-67
2,4-Dichloropyridine	26452-80-2	-1
2,5-Dichloropyridine	16110-09-1	59-62
2,6-Dichloropyridine	2402-78-0	83-86
3,4-Dichloropyridine	55934-00-4	22–24
3,5-Dichloropyridine	2457-47-8	65-67
