= Fluoropyridine =

Class of fluorinated pyridine compounds

Fluoropyridines are organic compounds belonging to the heterocycles (more specifically, heteroaromatics). They consist of a pyridine ring substituted with fluorine (–F). Depending on the position of substitution, three constitutional isomers exist, all with the molecular formula C_{5}H_{4}FN.

Fluoropyridines
Name	2-Fluoropyridine	3-Fluoropyridine	4-Fluoropyridine
Structural formula			
CAS number	372-48-5	372-47-4	694-52-0
PubChem	9746	67794	136504
Molecular formula	C_{5}H_{4}FN		
Molar mass	97.09 g·mol^{−1}		
Physical state	liquid	liquid	liquid
Boiling point	125 °C	107 °C	108 °C
Density	1.128 g/cm^{3}		

The fluoropyridines are prepared from the corresponding 2-, 3-, and 4-aminopyridines via diazotization using the Balz-Schiemann reaction. The literature for 2-fluoropyridine is greater than that for the other two isomers. The C-F bond is readily displaced by amine nucleophiles to give diverse 2-aminopyridines.

== Related compounds ==
- Chloropyridine
- Bromopyridine
- Iodopyridine
- Pentafluoropyridine
