= Collidinic acid =

Names
- Preferred IUPAC name Pyridine-2,4,6-tricarboxylic acid
- Other names 2,4,6-Pyridinetricarboxylic acid

Identifiers
| CAS Number | 536-20-9 |
| 3D model (JSmol) | Interactive image |
| ChEMBL | ChEMBL1321223 |
| ChemSpider | 306468 |
| PubChem CID | 345552 |
| UNII | BD2YV5DB4G |
| CompTox Dashboard (EPA) | DTXSID40323169 |
- InChI: InChI=1S/C8H5NO6/c10-6(11)3-1-4(7(12)13)9-5(2-3)8(14)15/h1-2H,(H,10,11)(H,12,13)(H,14,15) Key: CHGYKYXGIWNSCD-UHFFFAOYSA-N
- SMILES: C1=C(C=C(N=C1C(=O)O)C(=O)O)C(=O)O

Properties
| Chemical formula | C_{8}H_{5}NO_{6} |
| Molar mass | 211.129 g·mol^{−1} |
- Except where otherwise noted, data are given for materials in their standard state (at 25 °C [77 °F], 100 kPa). Infobox references

Collidinic acid (pyridine-2,4,6-tricarboxylic acid) is an organic compound that belongs to the heterocycles (more precisely the heteroaromatics). It belongs to the group of pyridinetricarboxylic acids and consists of a pyridine ring which carries three carboxy groups in the 2-, 4- and 6-positions. The name is derived from 2,4,6-collidine (2,4,6-trimethylpyridine).

== Preparation ==
The compound can be obtained from the oxidation of 2,4,6-collidine by potassium permanganate.

== Uses ==
Collidinic acid can be used in the spectrophotometric determination of iron.
