= Bromopyridine =

Bromopyridines are a group of aryl bromides consisting of a pyridine ring with bromine atoms as substituents.

This may refer to:

- 2-Bromopyridine
- 3-Bromopyridine
- 4-Bromopyridine

== Related compounds ==
- Fluoropyridine
- Chloropyridine
- Iodopyridine
