= Picoline =

Group of chemical compounds

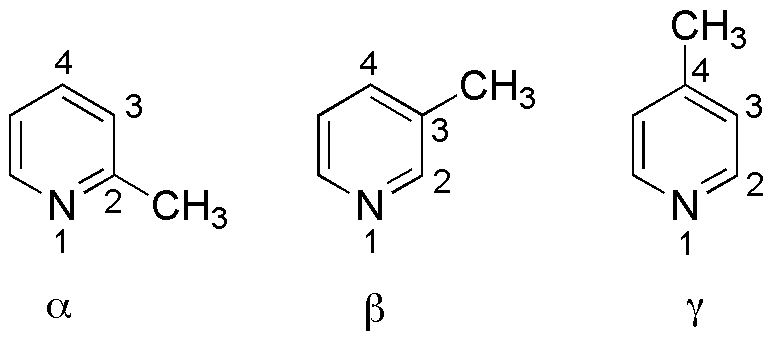
Molecular formulae of the three isomers of picoline (methylpyridine)

Picoline refers to any of three isomers of methylpyridine (CH_{3}C_{5}H_{4}N). They are all colorless liquids with a characteristic smell similar to that of pyridine. They are miscible with water and most organic solvents.

== Isomers ==
Name(s)	CAS#	m.p. (°C)	b.p. (°C)	pK_{a} of pyridinium ion	structure
2-Methylpyridine, α-picoline, 2-picoline	[109-06-8]	−66.7	129.4	5.96	α-picoline
3-Methylpyridine, β-picoline, 3-picoline	[108-99-6]	−18	141	5.63	β-picoline
4-Methylpyridine, γ-picoline, 4-picoline	[108-89-4]	3.6	145.4	5.98	γ-picoline

The CAS number of an unspecified picoline isomer is [1333-41-1]. The methyl group in 2- and 4- picolines is reactive; e.g., 2-picolines condenses with acetaldehyde in the presence of warm aqueous sodium hydroxide to form 2-propenylpyridine.

== History ==
Picoline was obtained, in impure form, in 1826 by the German chemist Otto Unverdorben (1806 – 1873), who obtained it by the pyrolysis (roasting) of bones. He called it Odorin due to its unpleasant smell. In 1849, the Scottish chemist Thomas Anderson (1819 – 1874) prepared picoline in pure form, from coal tar and via the pyrolysis of bones. Anderson also named picoline by combining the Latin words pix (tar) and oleum (oil) because coal tar oil was a source of picoline. By 1870, the German chemist Adolf von Baeyer had synthesized picoline in two ways: by the dry distillation of acroleïnammoniak (CH_{2}=CH-CH=N-CHOH-CH=CH_{2}) and by heating tribromallyl (1,2,3-tribromopropane) with ammonia in ethanol.

In 1871, the English chemist and physicist James Dewar speculated that picoline was methylpyridine. If the structure of pyridine that had been proposed in 1869 by the German-Italian chemist Wilhelm Körner were correct, that is, if pyridine were analogous to benzene (a hexagonal ring of alternating single and double bonds), then there should be three isomers of methylpyridine. By 1879, the Austrian chemist Hugo Weidel had succeeded in isolating and characterizing three isomers of picoline, which he denoted α–, β–, and γ–picoline: α–picoline was the main component of impure picoline; it was accompanied by small quantities of β–picoline; and γ–picoline was produced by Baeyer's dry distillation of acroleïnammoniak. Weidel then subjected each isomer of picoline to oxidation by potassium permanganate, transforming each into a carboxylic acid. He called the acid from α–picoline Picolinsäure (picolinic acid). He recognized the acid from β–picoline as Nicotinsäure (nicotinic acid or "niacin"), which Weidel had discovered in 1873. When Weidel decarboxylated the carboxylic acid of each isomer – by dry distilling its calcium salt with calcium oxide – the reaction yielded pyridine, thus showing that picoline was a mixture of three isomers of methylpyridine, as expected. However, Weidel did not determine, for any of the three isomers, the position of the methyl group in relation to the nitrogen atom of the pyridine nucleus. The structure of niacin, and thus β–picoline, was determined in 1883 when the Czech-Austrian chemist Zdenko Hans Skraup and Albert Cobenzl repeatedly oxidized β–naphthoquinoline and found niacin among the products, thus proving that β–picoline was 3-methylpyridine.

== Environmental properties ==
Picolines exhibit greater volatility and are more slowly degraded than their carboxylic acid counterparts. Volatilization is much less extensive in soil than water, owing to sorption of the compounds to soil clays and organic matter. Picoline degradation appears to be mediated primarily by bacteria, with the majority of isolates belonging to the Actinobacteria. 3-Methylpyridine degrades more slowly than the other two isomers, likely due to the impact of resonance in the heterocyclic ring. Like most simple pyridine derivatives, the picolines contain more nitrogen than is needed for growth of microorganisms, and excess nitrogen is generally excreted to the environment as ammonium during the degradation process.
