= 4-tert-Butylcatechol =

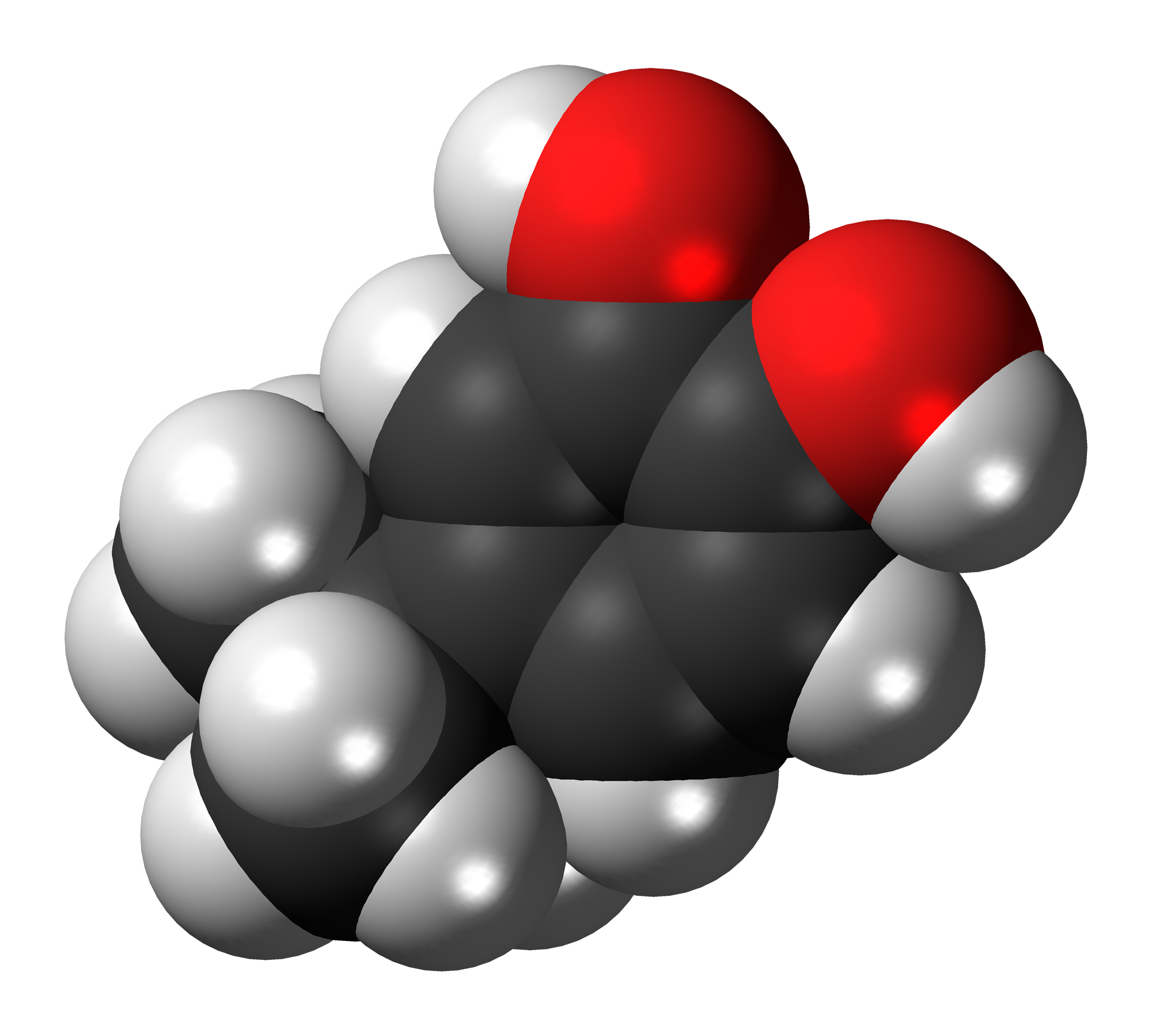

Names
- Preferred IUPAC name 4-tert-Butylbenzene-1,2-diol
- Other names para-tert-Butylcatechol p-tert-Butylcatechol t-Butyl catechol p-t-Butylpyrocatechol p-tert-Butylpyrocatechol; 4-t-Butylpyrocatechol; 4-tert-Butylpyrocatechol

Identifiers
CAS Number	98-29-3
3D model (JSmol)	Interactive image
Abbreviations	TBC
ChEMBL	ChEMBL220845
ChemSpider	7103
ECHA InfoCard	100.002.413
PubChem CID	7381
UNII	9A069144KR
CompTox Dashboard (EPA)	DTXSID5024687
- InChI: InChI=1S/C10H14O2/c1-10(2,3)7-4-5-8(11)9(12)6-7/h4-6,11-12H,1-3H3 Key: XESZUVZBAMCAEJ-UHFFFAOYSA-N; InChI=1/C10H14O2/c1-10(2,3)7-4-5-8(11)9(12)6-7/h4-6,11-12H,1-3H3 Key: XESZUVZBAMCAEJ-UHFFFAOYAR
- SMILES: Oc1ccc(cc1O)C(C)(C)C

Properties
Chemical formula	C_{10}H_{14}O_{2}
Molar mass	166.217 g/mol
Melting point	50 °C
Boiling point	285 °C
- Except where otherwise noted, data are given for materials in their standard state (at 25 °C [77 °F], 100 kPa). verify (what is ?) Infobox references

4-tert-Butylcatechol (TBC) is an organic chemical compound which is a derivative of catechol. TBC is available in the form of a solid crystal flake and 85% solution in methanol or water.

== Uses ==
It is added as a stabilizer and polymerisation inhibitor to butadiene, styrene, vinyl acetate, divinylbenzene and other reactive monomer streams.

TBC is also used as a stabilizer in the manufacture of polyurethane foam. It also can be used as an antioxidant for synthetic rubber, polymers and oil derivatives. It can be used as purification agent for aminoformate catalysts.

It is 25 times better than hydroquinone at 60 °C for polymerization inhibitory effect.

== See also ==
- tert-Butylhydroquinone

== Sources ==
- US Patent 4061545:Polymerization inhibitor for vinyl aromatic compounds
- US Patent 3046472: Substituted Catechol Antioxidants
