= 2,4,6-Trimethylpyridine =

Names
- Preferred IUPAC name 2,4,6-Trimethylpyridine

Identifiers
CAS Number	108-75-8
3D model (JSmol)	Interactive image
ChEBI	CHEBI:189131
ChEMBL	ChEMBL1209580
ECHA InfoCard	100.003.286
EC Number	203-613-3
PubChem CID	7953
UNII	7IE4BK5J5V
UN number	1993 (COLLIDINE)
CompTox Dashboard (EPA)	DTXSID1051561
- InChI: InChI=1S/C8H11N/c1-6-4-7(2)9-8(3)5-6/h4-5H,1-3H3 Key: BWZVCCNYKMEVEX-UHFFFAOYSA-N
- SMILES: CC1=CC(=NC(=C1)C)C

Properties
Chemical formula	C_{8}H_{11}N
Molar mass	121.18 g·mol^{−1}
Appearance	colourless liquid with pyridine-like smell
Melting point	-44,5 °C
Boiling point	171–172 °C
Solubility in water	35 g·l^{−1} (20 °C)
Vapor pressure	4 hPa (20 °C)
Acidity (pK_{a})	7.43 (25 °C)

Hazards
- GHS labelling
Pictograms	(GHS02: Flammable) (GHS06: Toxic) (GHS07: Exclamation mark)
Signal word	Danger
Hazard statements	H226, H302, H311, H312, H315, H319, H332, H335
Precautionary statements	P210, P233, P240, P241, P242, P243, P261, P262, P264, P264+P265, P270, P271, P280, P301+P317, P302+P352, P303+P361+P353, P304+P340, P305+P351+P338, P316, P317, P319, P321, P330, P332+P317, P337+P317, P361+P364, P362+P364, P370+P378, P403+P233, P403+P235, P405, P501
- Except where otherwise noted, data are given for materials in their standard state (at 25 °C [77 °F], 100 kPa). Infobox references

2,4,6-Trimethylpyridine (2,4,6-collidine) is an organic compound which belongs to the heterocycles (more precisely, heteroaromatics). It consists of a pyridine ring substituted with three methyl groups. It belongs to the substance group of the collidines, a group of six constitutional isomers. 2,4,6-trimethylpyridine is the most well-known isomer of this group.

== Properties ==
The compound has a refractive index of 1.4959 (25 °C).

== Preparation ==
2,4,6-Trimethylpyridine was isolated from Dippel's oil in 1854. A synthesis can be carried out analogously to the Hantzsch's dihydropyridine synthesis from ethyl acetoacetate (as β-ketocarbonyl compound), acetaldehyde and ammonia in the ratio 2: 1: 1.

== Use ==
By oxidation of the methyl groups with potassium permanganate collidinic acid is obtained.

2,4,6-Trimethylpyridine is used in organic syntheses (for example, for dehydrohalogenation), by binding the formed hydrogen halides.

As a member of the pyridines, it can be used as a basic probe for Bronsted and Lewis acidity quantification on solid acids (such as zeolites, aluminas, metal oxides, etc.) with FTIR analysis. Its size difference with pyridine is advantageous for location-specific (external vs internal) acidity probing. Both for Lewis and Bronsted acidity probing, the nitrogen atom is the source of the basicity.

== See also ==
- 2,6-Dimethylpyridine (lutidine)
