= Iodopyridine =

Iodopyridine describes organoiodine compounds that consist of a pyridine ring wherein one or more hydrogen atoms is substituted by one or more iodide.

Iodopyridines
IUPAC name	2-iodopyridine	3-iodopyridine	4-iodopyridine
Chemical structure	Structure of 2-iodopyridine	Structure of 3-iodopyridine	Structure of 4-iodopyridine
CAS number	5029-67-4	1120-90-7	15854-87-2
PubChem	CID 221126 from PubChem	CID 70714 from PubChem	CID 609492 from PubChem
Chemical formula	IC_{5}H_{4}N		
Molar mass	205 g/mol		
Appearance	colorless solid	colorless solid	colorless solid
Melting point	118–120 °C	52–53 °C	98–99 °C
Boiling point	202–203 °C	40 °C (10 Torr)	–
Density	1.928 g/cm^{3}	–	–

== Preparations ==
4-Iodopyridine can be prepared from 4-aminopyridine via diazotization followed by treatment with copper(I) iodide. 2-Iodopyridine can also be produced via diazotization, but a copper-catalyzed salt metathesis method from 2-chloropyridine is simpler

== Applications ==
A known use of 2-iodopyridine is in the synthesis of dipraglurant (patented, last step is a Sonogashira coupling reaction).

A known use of 3-iodopyridine is in the synthesis of CI-844 (3-Phenoxypyridine).

== Related compounds ==
- Fluoropyridine
- Chloropyridine
- Bromopyridine
