= Berberonic acid =

Names
- Preferred IUPAC name Pyridine-2,4,5-tricarboxylic acid
- Other names 2,4,5-Pyridinetricarboxylic acid

Identifiers
| CAS Number | 490-28-8 |
| 3D model (JSmol) | Interactive image |
| ChemSpider | 9075159 |
| PubChem CID | 10899899 |
| UNII | HDZ7RH33XB |
| CompTox Dashboard (EPA) | DTXSID401302807 |
- InChI: InChI=1S/C8H5NO6/c10-6(11)3-1-5(8(14)15)9-2-4(3)7(12)13/h1-2H,(H,10,11)(H,12,13)(H,14,15) Key: IFLXVSWHQQZRQI-UHFFFAOYSA-N
- SMILES: C1=C(C(=CN=C1C(=O)O)C(=O)O)C(=O)O

Properties
| Chemical formula | C_{8}H_{5}NO_{6} |
| Molar mass | 211.129 g·mol^{−1} |
- Except where otherwise noted, data are given for materials in their standard state (at 25 °C [77 °F], 100 kPa). Infobox references

Berberonic acid (pyridine-2,4,5-tricarboxylic acid) is an organic compound that belongs to the heterocycles (more precisely the heteroaromatics). It belongs to the group of pyridinetricarboxylic acids and consists of a pyridine ring which carries three carboxy groups in the 2-, 4- and 5-positions. The name is derived from berberine.

== Preparation ==
Berberonic acid is obtained in the oxidation of berberine with nitric acid. It can also be derived by oxidative degradation of monascaminone with potassium permanganate.
