= 2-Methylpentamethylenediamine =

Chemical compound

- 2-Methylpentamethylenediamine line structure

Names
- Preferred IUPAC name 2-Methylpentane-1,5-diamine
- Other names 1,5-Diamino-2-methylpentane, 2-Methylpentanediamine

Identifiers
CAS Number	15520-10-2
3D model (JSmol)	Interactive image
ChEMBL	ChEMBL3561766
ChemSpider	77450
ECHA InfoCard	100.035.945
EC Number	239-556-6
PubChem CID	85862
UNII	0FYC3Y758A
CompTox Dashboard (EPA)	DTXSID5027772
- InChI: InChI=1S/C6H16N2/c1-6(5-8)3-2-4-7/h6H,2-5,7-8H2,1H3 Key: JZUHIOJYCPIVLQ-UHFFFAOYSA-N
- SMILES: CC(CCCN)CN

Properties
Chemical formula	C_{6}H_{16}N_{2}
Molar mass	116.208 g·mol^{−1}
Appearance	colorless liquid
Boiling point	192 °C (378 °F; 465 K)

Hazards
- Occupational safety and health (OHS/OSH)
Main hazards	Irritant, Corrosive, Acute Toxic
- GHS labelling
Pictograms	(GHS05: Corrosive) (GHS06: Toxic) (GHS07: Exclamation mark)
Signal word	Danger
Hazard statements	H302, H312, H314, H331, H332, H335
Precautionary statements	P260, P264, P270, P271, P280, P301+P312, P301+P330+P331, P302+P352, P303+P361+P353, P304+P312, P304+P340, P305+P351+P338, P310, P311, P312, P321, P322, P330, P363, P403+P233, P405, P501
Flash point	83
- Except where otherwise noted, data are given for materials in their standard state (at 25 °C [77 °F], 100 kPa). (what is ?) Infobox references

2-Methylpentamethylenediamine is an organic compound part of the amine family with the formula H_{2}NCH_{2}CH_{2}CH_{2}CH(CH_{3})CCH_{2}NCH_{2}. A colorless liquid, this diamine is obtained by the hydrogenation of 2-methylglutaronitrile. It is better known by the trade name "Dytek A".

== Uses ==
2-Methylpentamethylenediamine can serve as a curing agent for epoxy resin systems. It gives good adhesion to metals and resistance against corrosion and other chemicals. It provides toughness, low blush, uniform finish, high gloss, and improves UV stability. It reduces gel time and is compatible with epoxy resins. It is suitable for marine, industrial, and decorative coatings.

2-Methylpentamethylenediamine can also be used as a chain extender for polyurethane applications, and in particular with PUDs. Its derivatives like aspartic esters, secondary amines, aldimines and ketoimines serve as curatives in polyurea systems. In polyamides, 2-Methylpentamethylenediamine acts as a crystallinity disruptor. This makes polymers amorphous in structure and slows down crystallization. It lowers melting point, improves surface appearance, increases abrasion resistance, and dye uptake. It also reduces water absorption, gelling, melt and quench temperatures.

In summary, its uses are:

- Corrosion inhibitor
- Polyamide adhesive and ink resins.
- Polyamide films, plastics, and fibers
- Epoxy curing agents
- Metalworking Fluids
- Chain extenders
- Water treatment chemicals
- Isocyanates

== Hazards ==
2-Methylpentamethylenediamine has many uses, but is a hazardous chemical. It can cause burns, is corrosive to skin, harmful when swallowed, and it can cause pulmonary edema and acute pneumonitis when inhaled in high concentrations.

== See also ==
- 1,2-Diaminocyclohexane
- Hexamethylenediamine
