= Chloropyridine =

Chloropyridines are a group of aryl chlorides consisting of a pyridine ring with chlorine atoms as substituents.

Chloropyridines include:

- 2-Chloropyridine
- 3-Chloropyridine
- 4-Chloropyridine
- 2,6-Dichloropyridine

== Production ==
Production of chloropyridines from pyridinols

Direct halogenation of pyridine with chlorine gas above 270 °C gives a mixture of 2-chloropyridine and 2,6-dichloropyridine.

2- and 4-chloropyridine are prepared from the corresponding pyridinols using phosphoryl chloride.

== Uses ==
Chloropyridines are important intermediates to pharmaceuticals and agrochemicals. A major use of 2-chloropyridine is the production of production of the fungicide pyrithione. Reaction of 4-chloropyridine with thioglycolic acid gives pyridylmercaptoacetic acid, a step in the production of cephalosporin antibiotics.

4-Chloropyridine is a precursor to ofornine & besipirdine.

== See also ==
- Bromopyridine
- Fluoropyridine
- Iodopyridine
