= Vinylpyridine =

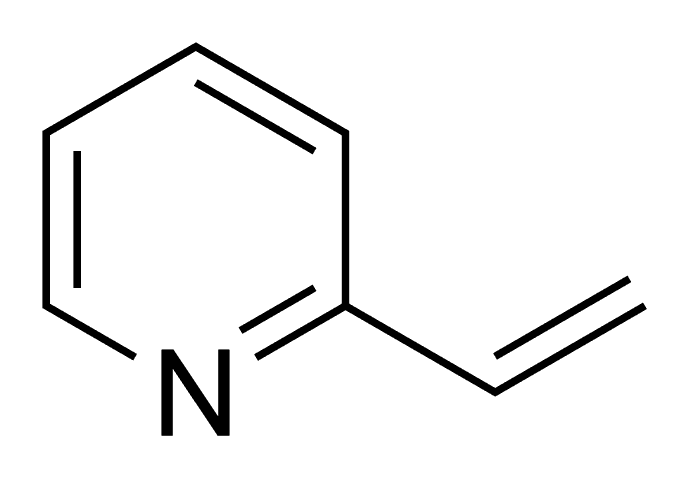
2-Vinylpyridine

Vinylpyridine may refer to:

- 2-Vinylpyridine
- 3-Vinylpyridine
- 4-Vinylpyridine
