= 4-Vinylpyridine =

Names
- Preferred IUPAC name 4-Ethenylpyridine
- Other names 4-VP

Identifiers
CAS Number	100-43-6
3D model (JSmol)	Interactive image
Beilstein Reference	104506
ChemSpider	7221
ECHA InfoCard	100.002.593
EC Number	202-852-0
PubChem CID	7502
UNII	I56G67XM8D
CompTox Dashboard (EPA)	DTXSID0051499
- InChI: InChI=1S/C7H7N/c1-2-7-3-5-8-6-4-7/h2-6H,1H2 Key: KFDVPJUYSDEJTH-UHFFFAOYSA-N
- SMILES: C=CC1=CC=NC=C1

Properties
Chemical formula	C_{7}H_{7}N
Molar mass	105.140 g·mol^{−1}
Appearance	colorless liquid
Density	0.988 g/cm^{3}
Boiling point	62–65 °C (144–149 °F; 335–338 K) 15 mmHg

Hazards
- GHS labelling
Pictograms	(GHS02: Flammable) (GHS05: Corrosive) (GHS06: Toxic) (GHS07: Exclamation mark) (GHS08: Health hazard) (GHS09: Environmental hazard)
Signal word	Danger
Hazard statements	H226, H301, H314, H315, H317, H319, H330, H334, H411
Precautionary statements	P210, P233, P240, P241, P242, P243, P260, P264, P270, P271, P272, P273, P280, P284, P285, P301+P310, P301+P330+P331, P302+P352, P303+P361+P353, P304+P340, P304+P341, P305+P351+P338, P310, P320, P321, P330, P332+P313, P333+P313, P337+P313, P342+P311, P362, P363, P370+P378, P391, P403+P233, P403+P235, P405, P501
- Except where otherwise noted, data are given for materials in their standard state (at 25 °C [77 °F], 100 kPa). Infobox references

4-Vinylpyridine (4-VP) is an organic compound with the formula CH_{2}CHC_{5}H_{4}N. It is a derivative of pyridine with a vinyl group in the 4-position. It is a colorless liquid, although impure samples are often brown. It is a monomeric precursor to specialty polymers. 4-Vinylpyridine is prepared by the condensation of 4-methylpyridine and formaldehyde.

4-VP is sometimes used in biochemistry to alkylate protein cysteine residues. When compared to other alkylation agents, such as iodoacetamide, acrylamide, and N-ethylmaleimide, 4-VP is less reactive, meaning the completion rate of cysteine alkylation is lower, but it also yields fewer side reactions. For some uses, such as during mass spectrometry measurements, 4-VP might be better because it is basic and can thus be protonated, adding net charge.

== See also ==
- 2-Vinylpyridine
