= 2-Vinylpyridine =

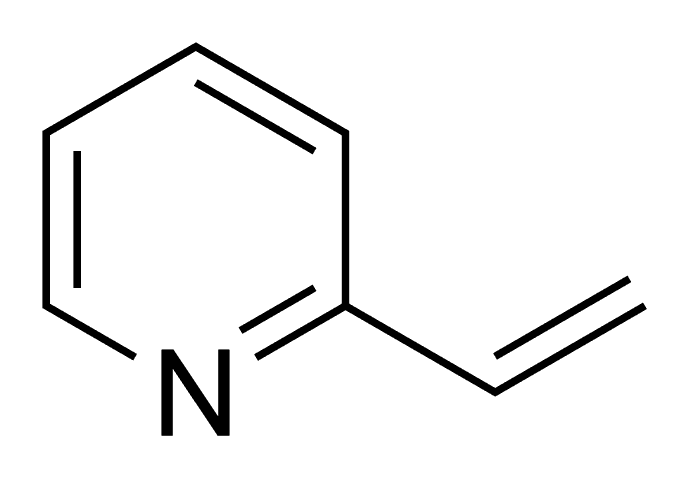

Names
- Preferred IUPAC name 2-Ethenylpyridine
- Other names 2-Vinylpyridine; 2VP

Identifiers
CAS Number	100-69-6
3D model (JSmol)	Interactive image
Beilstein Reference	104505
ChemSpider	7240
ECHA InfoCard	100.002.618
EC Number	202-879-8
PubChem CID	7521
RTECS number	UU1040000
UNII	DT4UV4NNKX
UN number	3073
CompTox Dashboard (EPA)	DTXSID1026667
- InChI: InChI=1S/C7H7N/c1-2-7-5-3-4-6-8-7/h2-6H,1H2 Key: KGIGUEBEKRSTEW-UHFFFAOYSA-N; InChI=1/C7H7N/c1-2-7-5-3-4-6-8-7/h2-6H,1H2 Key: KGIGUEBEKRSTEW-UHFFFAOYAO
- SMILES: C=CC1=CC=CC=N1

Properties
Chemical formula	C_{7}H_{7}N
Molar mass	105.140 g·mol^{−1}
Appearance	colorless liquid
Density	0.977 g/cm^{3}
Melting point	−50 °C (−58 °F; 223 K)
Boiling point	158 °C (316 °F; 431 K)
Solubility in water	27.5 g/L
Vapor pressure	96 hPa (72 mmHg) at 100 °C
Acidity (pK_{a})	4.98 (for C_{5}H_{4}(CH=CH_{2})NH^{+})
Viscosity	1.17 mPas

Hazards
- GHS labelling
Pictograms	(GHS02: Flammable) (GHS05: Corrosive) (GHS06: Toxic) (GHS07: Exclamation mark) (GHS09: Environmental hazard)
Signal word	Danger
Hazard statements	H226, H301, H302, H311, H314, H317, H331, H411
Precautionary statements	P210, P233, P240, P241, P242, P243, P260, P264, P270, P271, P272, P273, P280, P301+P310, P301+P312, P301+P330+P331, P302+P352, P303+P361+P353, P304+P340, P305+P351+P338, P310, P311, P312, P321, P322, P330, P333+P313, P361, P363, P370+P378, P391, P403+P233, P403+P235, P405, P501
Flash point	48 °C (118 °F; 321 K)
- Except where otherwise noted, data are given for materials in their standard state (at 25 °C [77 °F], 100 kPa). verify (what is ?) Infobox references

2-Vinylpyridine is an organic compound with the formula CH_{2}CHC_{5}H_{4}N. It is a derivative of pyridine with a vinyl group in the 2-position, next to the nitrogen. It is a colorless liquid, although samples are often brown. It is used industrially as a precursor to specialty polymers and as an intermediate in the chemical, pharmaceutical, dye, and photo industries. Vinylpyridine is sensitive to polymerization. It may be stabilized with a polymerisation inhibitor such as tert-butylcatechol. Owing to its tendency to polymerize, samples are typically refrigerated.

== Synthesis ==
It was first synthesized in 1887. A contemporary preparation entails condensation of 2-methylpyridine with formaldehyde, followed by dehydration of the intermediate alcohol. The reaction is carried out between 150–200 °C in an autoclave. The conversion is kept relatively low. After removal of unreacted 2-methylpyridine by distillation, concentrated aqueous sodium hydroxide is added to the residue and the resultant mixture is distilled under reduced pressure. During distillation, the dehydration of 2-(2-pyridyl)ethanol occurs to give 2-vinylpyridine, which can be purified further by fractional distillation under reduced pressure in the presence of an inhibitor such as 4-tert-butylcatechol.

CH_{3}C_{5}H_{4}N + CH_{2}O → HOCH_{2}CH_{2}C_{5}H_{4}N
HOCH_{2}CH_{2}C_{5}H_{4}N → CH_{2}=CHC_{5}H_{4}N + H_{2}O

An alternative synthesis involves the reaction of acrylonitrile and acetylene below 130–140 ̊C in the presence of organocobalt compounds as a catalyst. Acrylonitrile is the solvent for the reaction.

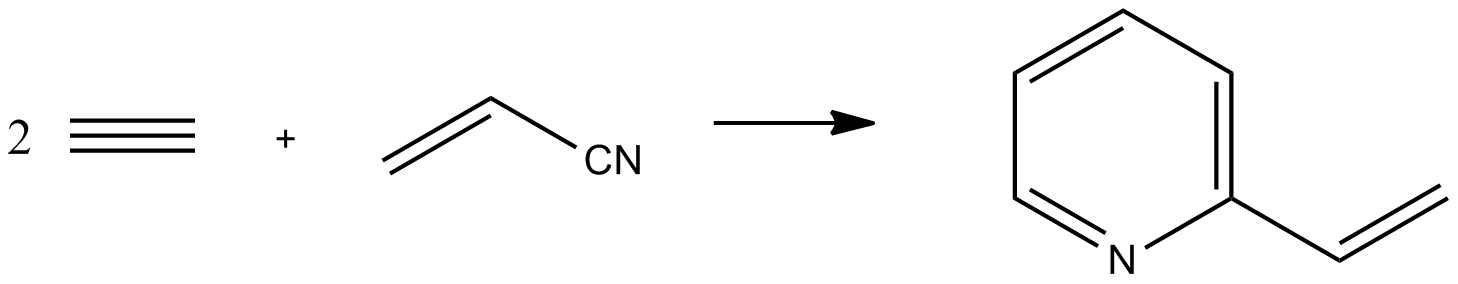

== Uses ==
=== Polymeric derivatives ===
2-Vinylpyridine is readily polymerized or copolymerized with styrene, butadiene, isobutylene, methyl methacrylate, and other compounds in the presence of radical, cationic, or anionic initiators. The homopolymer is soluble in organic solvents such as methanol and acetone, whereas cross-linked copolymers are insoluble in organic solvents.

An important application of 2-vinylpyridine involves the production of a latex terpolymer of 2-vinylpyridine, styrene, and butadiene, for use as a tire-cord binder. The tire cord is treated first with a resorcinol-formaldehyde polymer and then with a terpolymer made from 15% 2-vinylpyridine, styrene, and butadiene. This treatment gives the close bonding of tire cord to rubber.

2-Vinylpyridine is a co-monomer for acrylic fibers. Between 1–5% of copolymerized 2-vinylpyridine provide the reactive sites for dyes.

=== Organic synthesis ===
Due to the electron-withdrawing effect of the ring nitrogen atom, 2-vinylpyridine adds nucleophiles such as methoxide, cyanide, hydrogen sulfide at the vinylic site to give addition products. The addition product of methanol to 2-vinylpyridine, 2-(2-methoxyethyl)pyridine is a veterinary anthelmintic.

Treating 2-vinylpyridine with 4-pyridinecarbonitrile and hydrogen chloride gives 1-[2-(2-pyridyl)ethyl]-4-cyanopyridinium chloride, which then can be used to prepare dimethylaminopyridine (DMAP), a widely used base catalyst.

2-Vinylpyridine is used in the production of Axitinib, a pharmaceutical.

== See also ==
- 4-Vinylpyridine
