= 4-Methylpyridine =

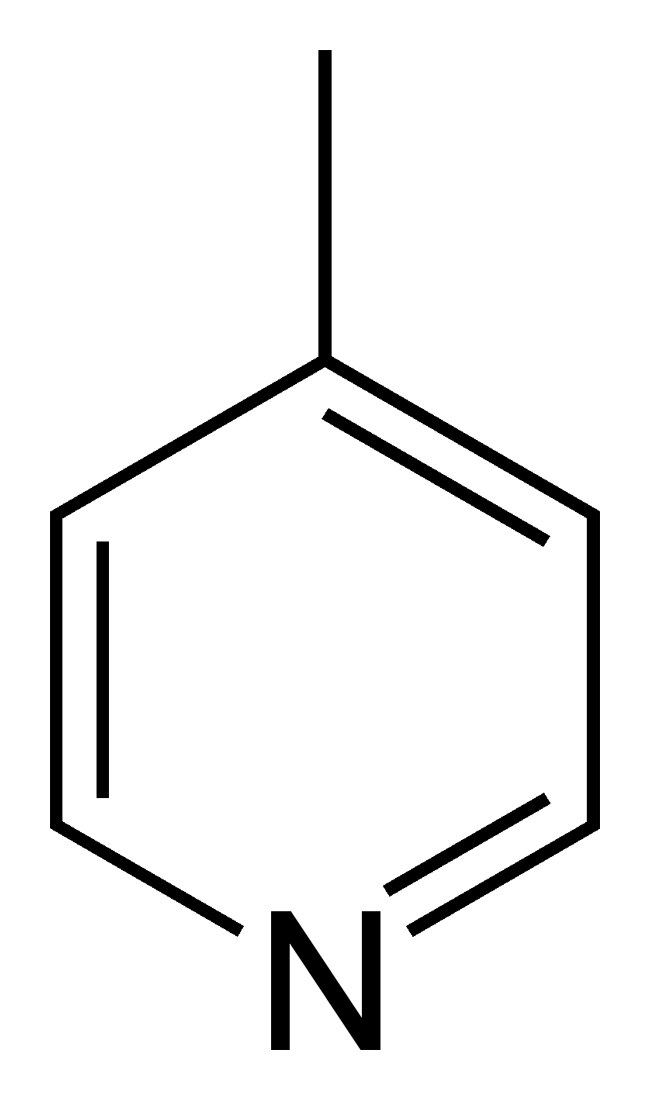

Names
- Preferred IUPAC name 4-Methylpyridine
- Other names 4-Picoline γ-picoline

Identifiers
CAS Number	108-89-4
3D model (JSmol)	Interactive image
ChEBI	CHEBI:32547
ChemSpider	13874733
ECHA InfoCard	100.003.298
PubChem CID	7963
UNII	TJD6V9SSO7
CompTox Dashboard (EPA)	DTXSID4021892
- InChI: InChI=1S/C6H7N/c1-6-2-4-7-5-3-6/h2-5H,1H3 Key: FKNQCJSGGFJEIZ-UHFFFAOYSA-N
- SMILES: Cc1ccncc1

Properties
Chemical formula	C_{6}H_{7}N
Molar mass	93.129 g·mol^{−1}
Appearance	colorless liquid
Density	0.957 g/mL
Melting point	2.4 °C (36.3 °F; 275.5 K)
Boiling point	145 °C (293 °F; 418 K)
Solubility in water	Miscible
Magnetic susceptibility (χ)	−59.8·10^{−6} cm^{3}/mol

Hazards
Flash point	39 °C (102 °F; 312 K)
Autoignition temperature	538 °C; 1,000 °F; 811 K
- Except where otherwise noted, data are given for materials in their standard state (at 25 °C [77 °F], 100 kPa). verify (what is ?) Infobox references

4-Methylpyridine is the organic compound with the formula CH_{3}C_{5}H_{4}N. It is one of the three isomers of methylpyridine. This pungent liquid is a building block for the synthesis of other heterocyclic compounds. Its conjugate acid, the 4-methylpyridinium ion, has a pK_{a} of 5.98, about 0.7 units above that of pyridine itself.

== Production and uses ==
4-Methylpyridine is both isolated from coal tar and is synthesized industrially. It forms via the reaction of acetaldehyde and ammonia in the presence of an oxide catalyst. The method also affords some 2-methylpyridine.

4-Methylpyridine is of little intrinsic value but is a precursor to other commercially significant species, often of medicinal interest. For example, ammoxidation of 4-methylpyridine gives 4-cyanopyridine, the precursor to a variety of other derivatives such as the antituberculosis drug isoniazid.

== Toxicity ==
Like most alkylpyridines, the LD_{50} of 4-methylpyridine is modest, being 1290 mg/kg (oral, rat).
