= 3-Methylpyridine =

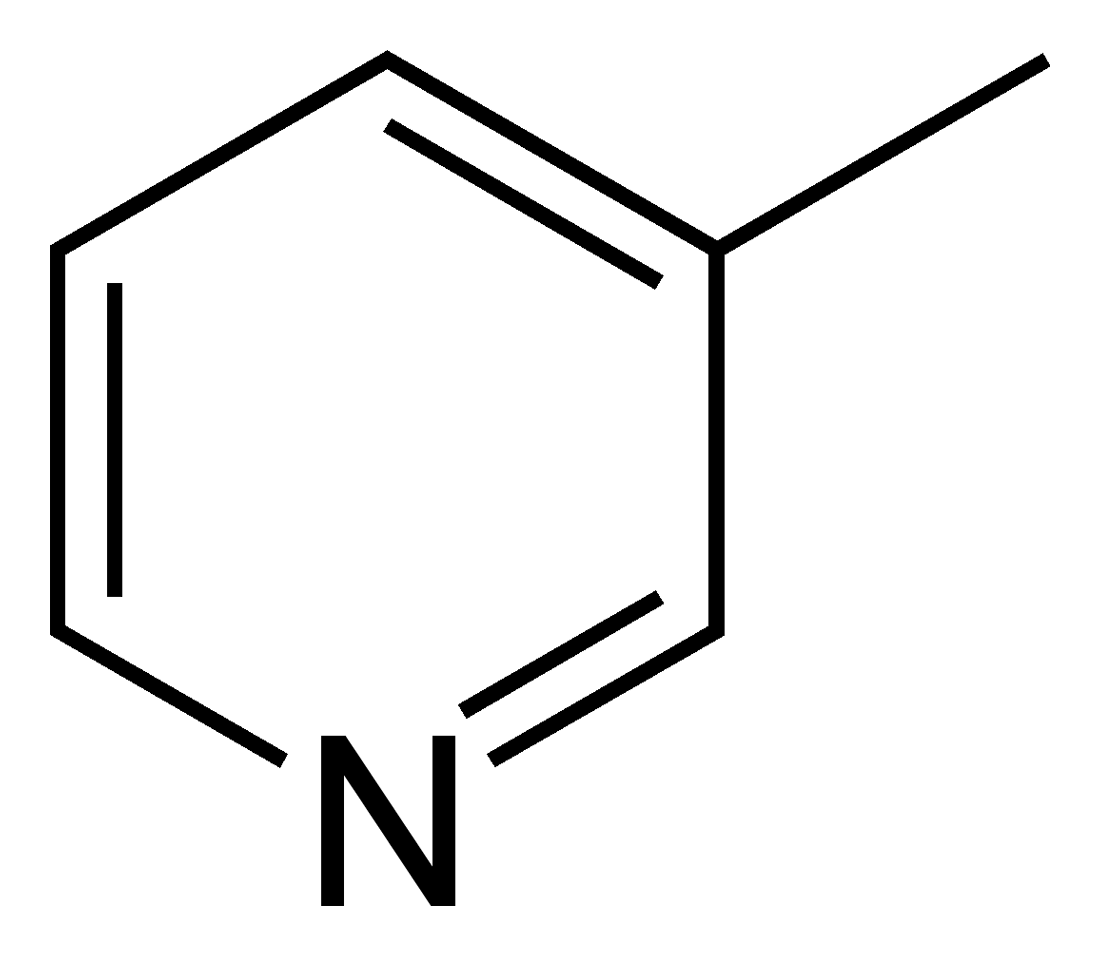

Names
- Preferred IUPAC name 3-Methylpyridine
- Other names 3-Picoline

Identifiers
CAS Number	108-99-6
3D model (JSmol)	Interactive image
Beilstein Reference	1366
ChEBI	CHEBI:39922
ChEMBL	ChEMBL15722
ChemSpider	21106520
DrugBank	DB01996
ECHA InfoCard	100.003.307
EC Number	203-636-9
Gmelin Reference	2450
PubChem CID	7970
RTECS number	TJ5000000
UNII	B083J4KF7F
UN number	2313
CompTox Dashboard (EPA)	DTXSID9021897
- InChI: InChI=1S/C6H7N/c1-6-3-2-4-7-5-6/h2-5H,1H3 Key: ITQTTZVARXURQS-UHFFFAOYSA-N
- SMILES: Cc1cccnc1

Properties
Chemical formula	C_{6}H_{7}N
Molar mass	93.129 g·mol^{−1}
Appearance	Colorless liquid
Density	0.957 g/mL
Melting point	−19 °C (−2 °F; 254 K)
Boiling point	144 °C (291 °F; 417 K)
Solubility in water	Miscible
Magnetic susceptibility (χ)	−59.8·10^{−6} cm^{3}/mol

Hazards
- GHS labelling
Pictograms	(GHS02: Flammable) (GHS05: Corrosive) (GHS06: Toxic) (GHS07: Exclamation mark)
Signal word	Danger
Hazard statements	H226, H302, H311, H314, H315, H319, H331, H332, H335
Precautionary statements	P210, P233, P240, P241, P242, P243, P260, P264, P270, P271, P280, P301+P312, P301+P330+P331, P302+P352, P303+P361+P353, P304+P312, P304+P340, P305+P351+P338, P310, P311, P312, P321, P322, P330, P332+P313, P337+P313, P361, P362, P363, P370+P378, P403+P233, P403+P235, P405, P501
- Except where otherwise noted, data are given for materials in their standard state (at 25 °C [77 °F], 100 kPa). verify (what is ?) Infobox references

3-Methylpyridine or 3-picoline, is an organic compound with formula 3-CH_{3}C_{5}H_{4}N. It is one of three positional isomers of methylpyridine, whose structures vary according to where the methyl group is attached around the pyridine ring. This colorless liquid is a precursor to pyridine derivatives that have applications in the pharmaceutical and agricultural industries. Like pyridine, 3-methylpyridine is a colorless liquid with a strong odor and is classified as a weak base.

== Synthesis ==
3-Methylpyridine is produced industrially by the reaction of acrolein, with ammonia. These ingredients are combined as gases which flows over an oxide-based heterogeneous catalyst. The reaction is multistep, culminating in cyclisation.

2 CH_{2}CHCHO + NH_{3} → CH_{3}C_{5}H_{4}N + 2 H_{2}O

This process also affords substantial amounts of pyridine, which arises by demethylation of the 3-methylpyridine. A route that gives better control of the product starts with acrolein, propionaldehyde, and ammonia:

CH_{2}CHCHO + CH_{3}CH_{2}CHO + NH_{3} → 3-CH_{3}C_{5}H_{4}N + 2 H_{2}O + H_{2}

It may also be obtained as a co-product of pyridine synthesis from acetaldehyde, formaldehyde, and ammonia via Chichibabin pyridine synthesis. Approximately 9,000,000 kilograms were produced worldwide in 1989. It has also been prepared by dehydrogenation of 3-methylpiperidine, derived from hydrogenation of 2-Methylglutaronitrile.

== Uses ==
3-Picoline is a useful precursor to agrochemicals, such as chlorpyrifos. Chlorpyrifos is produced from 3,5,6-trichloro-2-pyridinol, which is generated from 3-picoline by way of cyanopyridine. This conversion involves the ammoxidation of 3-methylpyridine:

CH_{3}C_{5}H_{4}N + 1.5 O_{2} + NH_{3} → NCC_{5}H_{4}N + 3 H_{2}O

3-Cyanopyridine is also a precursor to 3-pyridinecarboxamide, which is a precursor to pyridinecarbaldehydes:

3-NCC_{5}H_{3}N + [H] + catalyst → 3-HC(O)C_{5}H_{4}N

Pyridinecarbaldehydes are used to make antidotes for poisoning by organophosphate acetylcholinesterase inhibitors.

== Environmental behavior ==
Pyridine derivatives (including 3-methylpyridine) are environmental contaminants, generally associated with processing fossil fuels, such as oil shale or coal. They are also found in the soluble fractions of crude oil spills. They have also been detected at legacy wood treatment sites. The high water solubility of 3-methyl pyridine increases the potential for the compound to contaminate water sources. 3-methyl pyridine is biodegradable, although it degrades more slowly and volatilize more readily from water samples than either 2-methyl- or 4-methyl-pyridine.,

3-Methylpyridine is the main precursor to niacin, one of the B vitamins. Approximately 10,000 tons of niacin are produced annually worldwide.

== See also ==
- Picoline

== Toxicity ==
Like most alkylpyridines, the LD_{50} of 2-methylpyridine is modest, being 400 mg/kg (oral, rat).
