= Nemertelline =

- Nemertelline skeletal structure

Names
- Preferred IUPAC name 1^{3},2^{2}:2^{3},3^{4}:3^{2},4^{3}-Quaterpyridine

Identifiers
CAS Number	59697-14-2
3D model (JSmol)	Interactive image
ChemSpider	2305572
KEGG	C17016
MeSH	Nemertelline
PubChem CID	3042423
UNII	45M2T55WTP
CompTox Dashboard (EPA)	DTXSID80208401
- InChI: InChI=1S/C20H14N4/c1-4-16(13-21-8-1)19-12-15(7-11-23-19)18-6-3-10-24-20(18)17-5-2-9-22-14-17/h1-14H Key: SWWRILUGNLIYGG-UHFFFAOYSA-N
- SMILES: C1=CN=CC(=C1)C1=CC(=CC=N1)C1=C(N=CC=C1)C1=CC=CN=C1

Properties
Chemical formula	C_{20}H_{14}N_{4}
Molar mass	310.360 g·mol^{−1}
- Except where otherwise noted, data are given for materials in their standard state (at 25 °C [77 °F], 100 kPa). Infobox references

Nemertelline is a neurotoxic tetra-pyridine compound originally found in the marine ribbon worm Amphiporus angulatus. These worms produce a variety of toxins which are used both in hunting down prey and in defending themselves from predators. Interest in potential application of this compound as an antifouling agent for boats and other marine installations has led to attempts to produce it synthetically by convenient routes. This compound is highly toxic to crustaceans but not mammals and is similar to the plant alkaloid nicotelline in structure.
