= 2-Methylpyridine =

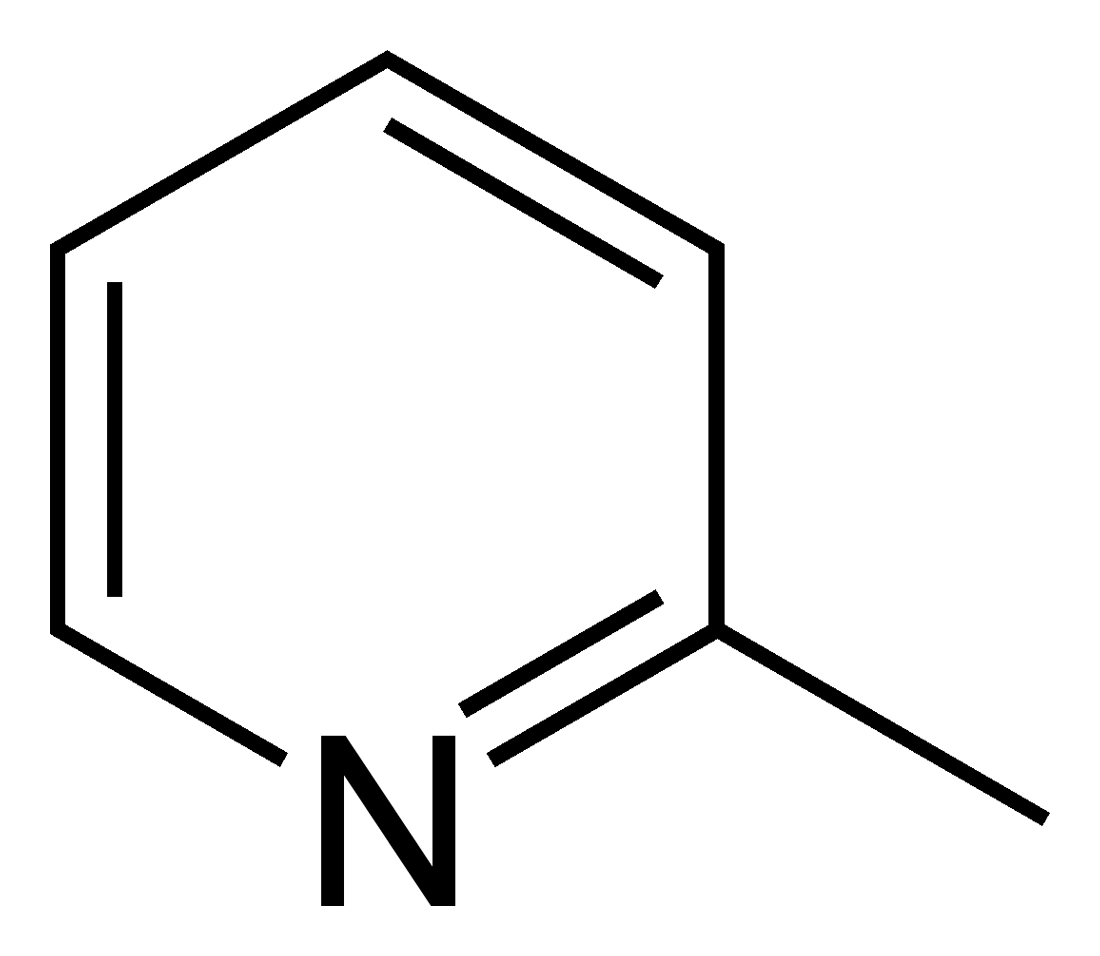

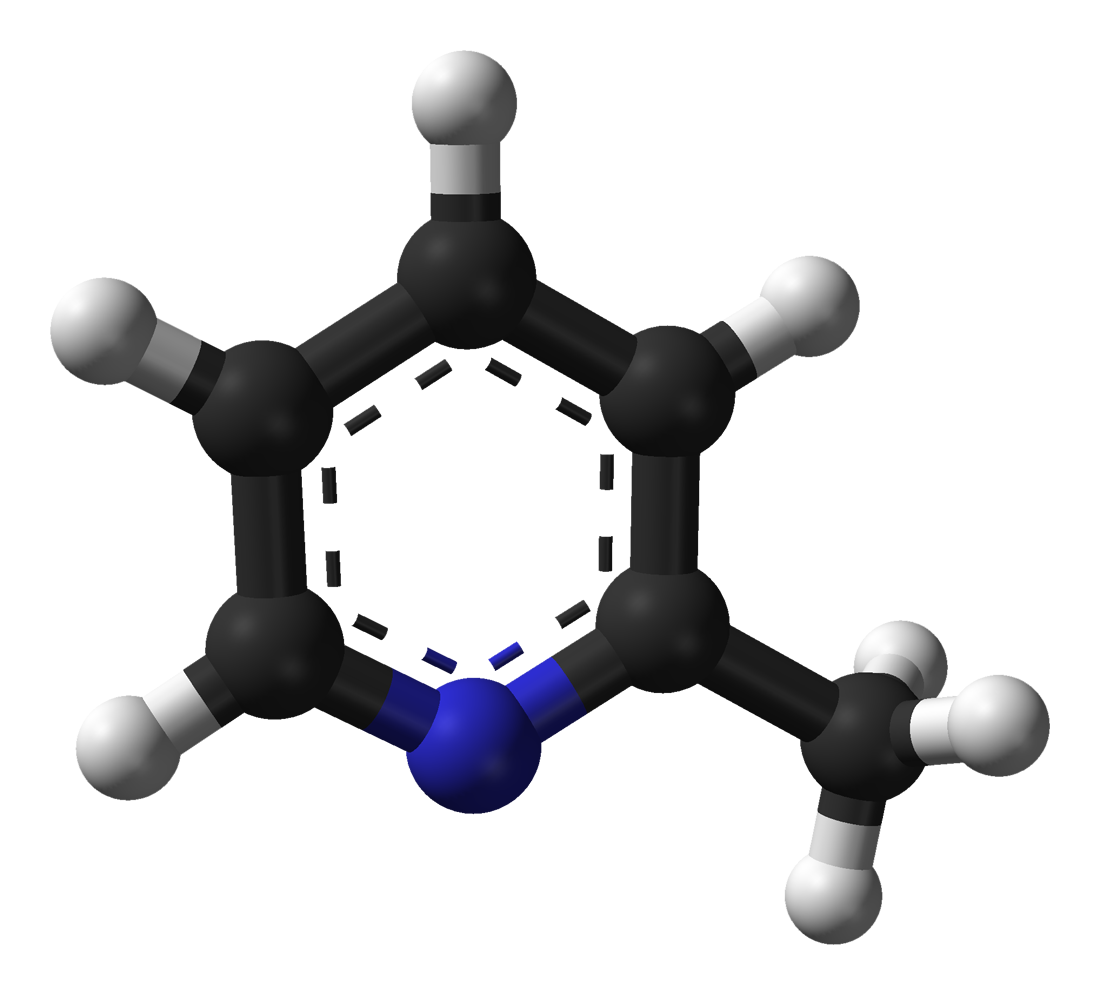

Names
- Preferred IUPAC name 2-Methylpyridine
- Other names 2-Picoline

Identifiers
CAS Number	109-06-8
3D model (JSmol)	Interactive image
ChEBI	CHEBI:50415
ChemSpider	13839199
ECHA InfoCard	100.003.313
PubChem CID	7975
UNII	3716Q16Q6A
CompTox Dashboard (EPA)	DTXSID9021899
- InChI: InChI=1S/C6H7N/c1-6-4-2-3-5-7-6/h2-5H,1H3 Key: BSKHPKMHTQYZBB-UHFFFAOYSA-N
- SMILES: Cc1ccccn1

Properties
Chemical formula	C_{6}H_{7}N
Molar mass	93.129 g·mol^{−1}
Appearance	Faintly yellow-green clear liquid
Density	0.943 g/mL
Melting point	−70 °C (−94 °F; 203 K)
Boiling point	128 to 129 °C (262 to 264 °F; 401 to 402 K)
Solubility in water	Miscible
Acidity (pK_{a})	5.94 (for C_{5}H_{4}(CH_{3})NH^{+})
Magnetic susceptibility (χ)	−60.3·10^{−6} cm^{3}/mol
- Except where otherwise noted, data are given for materials in their standard state (at 25 °C [77 °F], 100 kPa). verify (what is ?) Infobox references

2-Methylpyridine, or 2-picoline, is the compound described with formula C_{6}H_{7}N. 2-Picoline is a colorless liquid that has an unpleasant odor similar to pyridine. It is mainly used to make vinylpyridine and the agrichemical nitrapyrin.

== Synthesis ==
2-Picoline was the first pyridine compound reported to be isolated in pure form. It was isolated from coal tar in 1846 by T. Anderson. This chemistry was practiced by Reilly Industries. It is now mainly produced by two principal routes. One method involves the condensation of acetaldehyde and ammonia in the presence of an oxide catalyst. This method affords a mixture of 2- and 4-picolines:

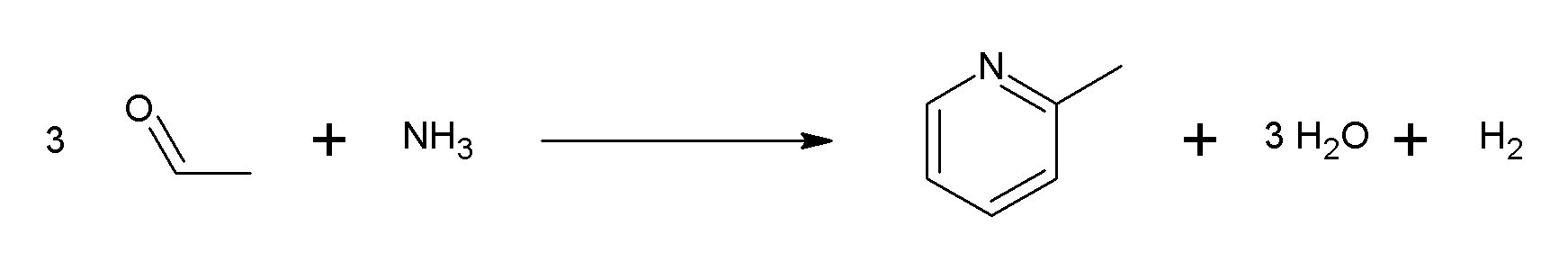

Another method involves the condensation of acetone and acrylonitrile to give 5-oxohexanenitrile, which then cyclizes to give 2-picoline. Approximately 8000 t/a was produced worldwide in 1989.

== Reactions ==
2-Methylpyridine is slightly more basic than pyridine, as reflected in the pKa's of the conjugate pyridinium salts, 5.94 and 5.25, respectively.

Most of the reactions of picoline are centered on the methyl group. For example, the principal use of 2-picoline is as a precursor of 2-vinylpyridine. The conversion is achieved by condensation with formaldehyde:

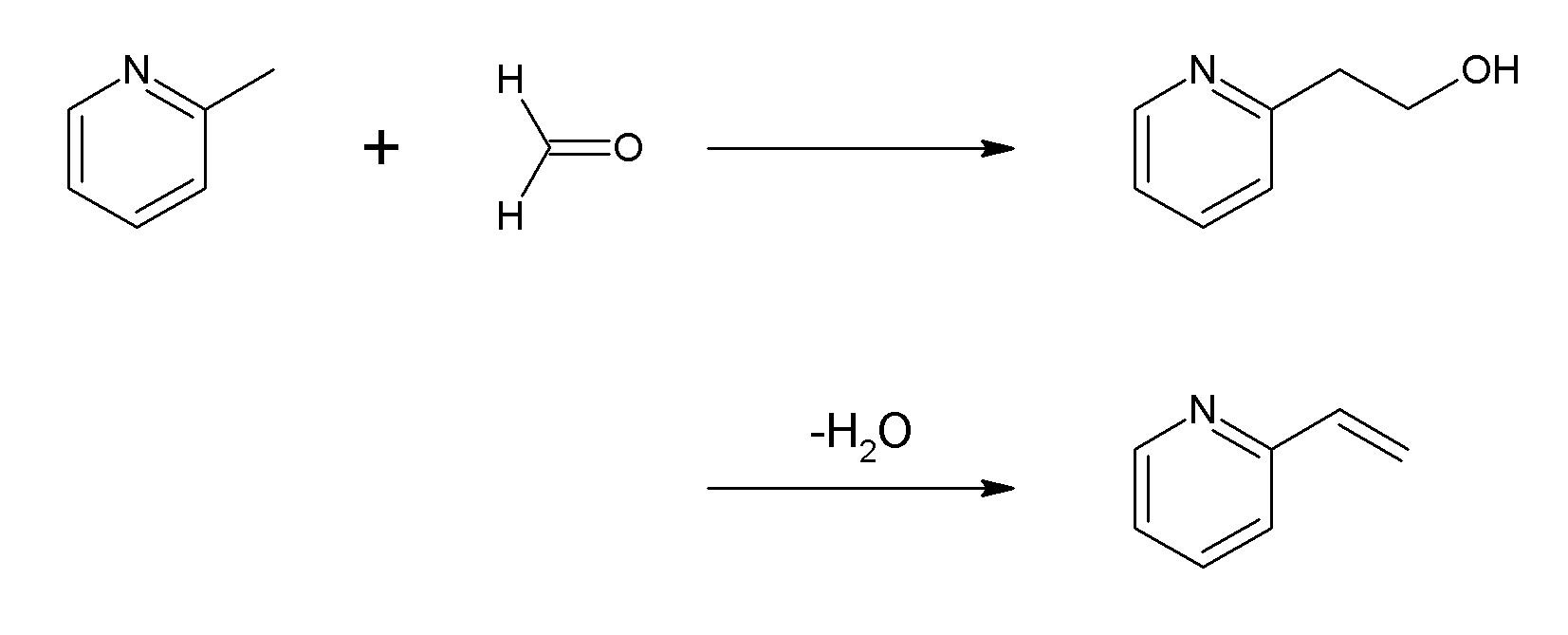

The copolymer of 2-vinylpyridine, butadiene and styrene is used as an adhesive for textile tire cord. 2-Picoline is also a precursor to the agrichemical, nitrapyrin, which prevents loss of ammonia from fertilizers. Oxidation by potassium permanganate affords picolinic acid:

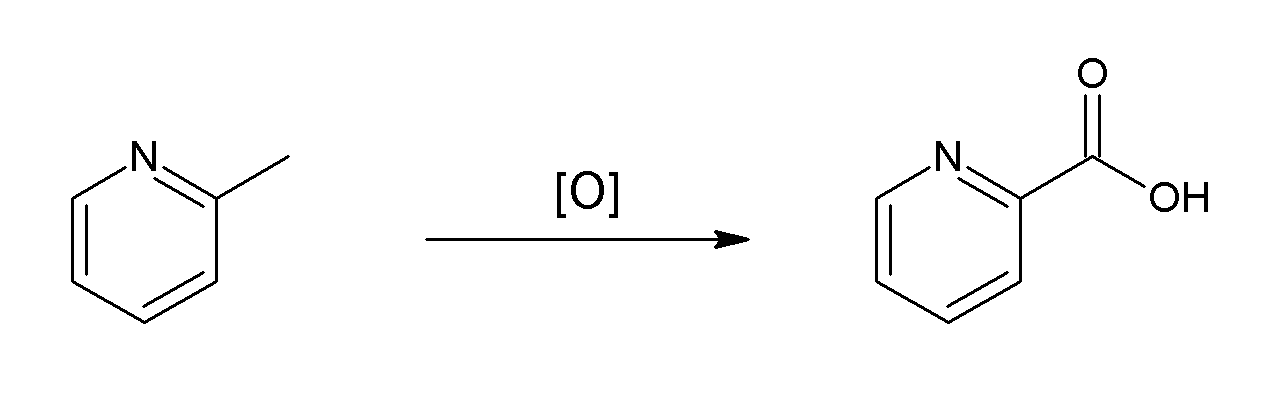

Treatment of 2-methylpyridine with butyllithium results in deprotonation of the methyl group:

H_{3}CC_{5}H_{4}N + BuLi → LiH_{2}CC_{5}H_{4}N + BuH

=== Biodegradation ===
Like other pyridine derivatives, 2-methylpyridine is often reported as an environmental contaminant associated with facilities processing oil shale or coal, and has also been found at legacy wood treatment sites. The compound is readily degradable by certain microorganisms, such as Arthrobacter sp. strain R1 (ATTC strain number 49987), which was isolated from an aquifer contaminated with a complex mixture of pyridine derivatives. Arthrobacter and closely related Actinomycetota are often found associated with degradation of pyridine derivatives and other nitrogen heterocyclic compounds. 2-methypyridine and 4-methypyridine are more readily degraded and exhibit less volatilization loss from environmental samples than does 3-methypyridine.

== Uses ==
2-Methylpyridine is an intermediate used in the production of some pharmaceutical drugs including amprolium, picoplatin, dimethindene, and encainide.

== Toxicity ==
Like most alkylpyridines, the LD_{50} of 2-methylpyridine is modest, being 790 mg/kg (oral, rat).
