= C5H4BrN =

The molecular formula C_{5}H_{4}BrN may refer to:

- Bromopyridines
  - 2-Bromopyridine
  - 3-Bromopyridine
