= Biricodar =

Pharmaceutical drug

Clinical data
- ATC code: none

Identifiers
- IUPAC name: 1,7-di(pyridin-3-yl)heptan-4-yl (2S)-1-[oxo(3,4,5-trimethoxyphenyl)acetyl]piperidine-2-carboxylate
- CAS Number: 174254-13-8
- PubChem CID: 3037617
- ChemSpider: 2301309
- UNII: 9WQP0L619L
- ChEMBL: ChEMBL350775
- CompTox Dashboard (EPA): DTXSID50893944

Chemical and physical data
- Formula: C_{34}H_{41}N_{3}O_{7}
- Molar mass: 603.716 g·mol^{−1}
- 3D model (JSmol): Interactive image
- SMILES: O=C(C(=O)c1cc(OC)c(OC)c(OC)c1)N4[C@H](C(=O)OC(CCCc2cccnc2)CCCc3cccnc3)CCCC4
- InChI: InChI=1S/C34H41N3O7/c1-41-29-20-26(21-30(42-2)32(29)43-3)31(38)33(39)37-19-5-4-16-28(37)34(40)44-27(14-6-10-24-12-8-17-35-22-24)15-7-11-25-13-9-18-36-23-25/h8-9,12-13,17-18,20-23,27-28H,4-7,10-11,14-16,19H2,1-3H3/t28-/m0/s1; Key:CGVWPQOFHSAKRR-NDEPHWFRSA-N

Biricodar (INN, codename VX-710, brand name Incel) was a pharmaceutical drug under development by Vertex Pharmaceuticals to help treat antineoplastic resistance in cancer.

Biricodar is considered a second-generation ABC transporter inhibitor and has been described as one of the most famous foundational drugs of this class. Although it has not been brought to market, biricodar continues to be used in basic research and is a compound of interest for potential clinical applications.

== History ==
Biricodar was patented in 1998 by Vertex Pharmaceuticals for the treatment of multi-drug antineoplastic resistance in cancer. Following a Phase I clinical trial, Phase II trials commenced in 1998 to administer biricodar alongside chemotherapy in the treatment of five common cancer indications. While biricodar showed modest effectiveness in one clinical trial, another clinical trial was terminated for failing to enhance antitumor activity or patient survival, and the drug never reached the market.

== Synthesis ==
Biricodar is produced by esterification after convergent synthesis of the N-acyl pipecolic acid and dipyridyl 4-heptanol.

A simplified route to the pipecolic acid begins with oxidation of trimethoxyacetophenone to the carboxylic acid, which is then condensed with trimethylsilyl pipecolate to yield an amide. Deprotection of the pipecolate yields the acid.

Production of the alcohol begins with propargylation of 3-butynal yielding 1,6-heptadiyn-4-ol. The terminal alkynes of the diynol are deprotonated by strong base, and the resulting acetylides displace bromide from 3-bromopyridine. Finally, hydrogenation of the alkynes yields 1,7-dipyridyl-4-heptanol. An alternative route proceeds via the Wittig reagent bis(triphenylphosphonium)pentan-3-ol and pyridine-3-carbaldehyde.

== Mechanism ==
Biricodar has been used in cancer research as an inhibitor of P-glycoprotein and the ABC transporter MRP-1. These membrane proteins are overexpressed in antineoplastic resistant cancer cells. It is owing to this mechanism that biricodar was developed for the treatment of antineoplastic resistance in cancer.
