= Potassium dithionite =

- Chemical structure of potassium dithionite

Identifiers
| CAS Number | 14293-73-3 |
| 3D model (JSmol) | Interactive image |
| ChemSpider | 55625 |
| PubChem CID | 61726 |
| UNII | 0B8I49QLG5 |
| CompTox Dashboard (EPA) | DTXSID40931687 |
- InChI: InChI=1S/2K.H2O4S2/c;;1-5(2)6(3)4/h;;(H,1,2)(H,3,4)/q2*+1;/p-2 Key: HEZHYQDYRPUXNJ-UHFFFAOYSA-L; InChI=1/2K.H2O4S2/c;;1-5(2)6(3)4/h;;(H,1,2)(H,3,4)/q2*+1;/p-2 Key: HEZHYQDYRPUXNJ-NUQVWONBAU
- SMILES: [O-]S(=O)S(=O)[O-].[K+].[K+]

Properties
| Chemical formula | K_{2}O_{4}S_{2} |
| Molar mass | 206.32 g/mol |
| Appearance | light yellow powder |
- Except where otherwise noted, data are given for materials in their standard state (at 25 °C [77 °F], 100 kPa). verify (what is ?) Infobox references

Potassium dithionite or potassium hydrosulfite is a potassium salt of dithionous acid. It is a powdery or flaky light-yellow colored solid. It is used to make dyes and other chemicals

The compound has UN number UN 1929. As a dithionite, it is closely related to sodium dithionite, which is a commonly used reducing agent and bleaching agent.

== See also ==
- List of UN numbers 1901 to 2000
