= Shallot (disambiguation) =

Shallot may refer to:

- Shallot, a widely cultivated plant producing an edible bulb
- Persian shallot, a plant native to Central Asia with edible bulbs sometimes gathered in the wild
- Part of the sound producing mechanism in a reed pipe of a pipe organ

Shallot may be a misspelling of:

- Shalott, an island in the poem "The Lady of Shalott" by Alfred Tennyson
