= Pyrithione =

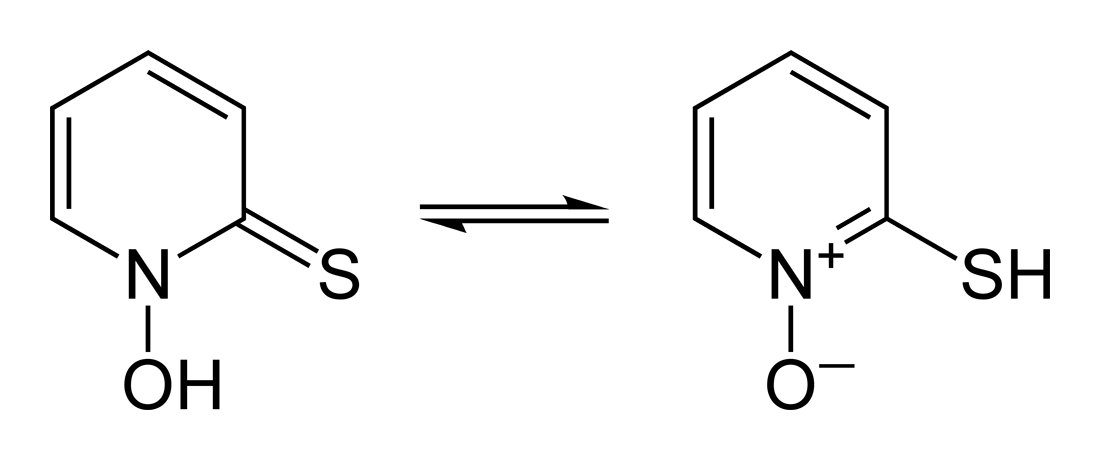
- Interconversion of pyrithione tautomers thione form on the left, thiol form on the right

Names
- Preferred IUPAC name 1-Hydroxy-2(1H)-pyridinethione (thione); 2-Pyridinethiol 1-oxide (thiol)
- Other names Omadine thione: 1-Hydroxypyridine-2-thione; N-Hydroxypyridine-2-thione thiol: 2-Mercaptopyridine monoxide 2-Mercaptopyridine N-oxide; 2-Mercaptopyridine 1-oxide

Identifiers
CAS Number	thione: 1121-30-8; thiol: 1121-31-9; 3811-73-2 thiolate salt: sodium 2-pyridinethiolate 1-oxide; 15922-78-8 thione salt: sodium 2-thioxo-1(2H)-pyridinolate
3D model (JSmol)	thione: Interactive image; thiol: Interactive image; thiolate salt: Interactive image; thione salt: Interactive image
Beilstein Reference	109936
ChEBI	thione: CHEBI:36578; thiol: CHEBI:36584
ChEMBL	thione: ChEMBL1650619; thiol: ChEMBL1356238
ChemSpider	thione: 1514; thiol: 10446934; 1513 thiolate salt; 18517 thione salt
DrugBank	DB06815
ECHA InfoCard	100.013.027
EC Number	214-328-9; thione: 214-329-4
Gmelin Reference	913415
PubChem CID	thione: 1570; 23685289 sodium pyrithione salt
UNII	6GK82EC25D
CompTox Dashboard (EPA)	DTXSID00149908
- InChI: thione: InChI=1S/C5H5NOS/c7-6-4-2-1-3-5(6)8/h1-4,7H Key: YBBJKCMMCRQZMA-UHFFFAOYSA-N; thiol: InChI=1S/C5H5NOS/c7-6-4-2-1-3-5(6)8/h1-4,8H Key: FGVVTMRZYROCTH-UHFFFAOYSA-N; thiolate salt: InChI=1S/C5H5NOS.Na/c7-6-4-2-1-3-5(6)8;/h1-4,8H;/q;+1/p-1 Key: WNGMMIYXPIAYOB-UHFFFAOYSA-M; thione salt: InChI=1S/C5H4NOS.Na/c7-6-4-2-1-3-5(6)8;/h1-4H;/q-1;+1 Key: XNRNJIIJLOFJEK-UHFFFAOYSA-N
- SMILES: thione: c1ccn(c(=S)c1)O; thiol: C1=CC=[N+](C(=C1)S)[O-]; thiolate salt: c1cc[n+](c(c1)[S-])[O-].[Na+]; thione salt: c1ccn(c(=S)c1)[O-].[Na+]

Properties
Chemical formula	C_{5}H_{5}NOS
Molar mass	127.16 g·mol^{−1}
Appearance	Beige crystalline powder
Melting point	70 to 73 °C (158 to 163 °F; 343 to 346 K)
Solubility in water	2.5 g L^{−1} at 20 °C
Solubility	Soluble: benzene, chloroform, dichloromethane, dimethylformamide, dimethylsulfoxide, ethyl acetate Slightly soluble: diethyl ether, ethanol, methyl tert-butyl ether, tetrahydrofuran
Acidity (pK_{a})	−1.95 (proton addition), 4.6

Hazards
- GHS labelling
Pictograms	(GHS06: Toxic)
Signal word	Danger
Hazard statements	H301, H315, H319, H335
Precautionary statements	P261, P264, P270, P271, P280, P301+P310, P302+P352, P304+P340, P305+P351+P338, P312, P321, P330, P332+P313, P337+P313, P362, P403+P233, P405, P501
- Except where otherwise noted, data are given for materials in their standard state (at 25 °C [77 °F], 100 kPa). Infobox references

Pyrithione is the common name of an organosulfur compound with molecular formula C_{5}H_{5}NOS, chosen as an abbreviation of pyridinethione, and found in the Persian shallot. It exists as a pair of tautomers, the major form being the thione 1-hydroxy-2(1H)-pyridinethione and the minor form being the thiol 2-mercaptopyridine N-oxide; it crystallises in the thione form. It is usually prepared from either 2-bromopyridine, 2-chloropyridine, or 2-chloropyridine N-oxide, and is commercially available as both the neutral compound and its sodium salt. It is used to prepare zinc pyrithione, which is used primarily to treat dandruff and seborrhoeic dermatitis in medicated shampoos, though is also an anti-fouling agent in paints.

== Preparation ==
The preparation of pyrithione was first reported in 1950 by Shaw and was prepared by reaction of 2-chloropyridine N-oxide with sodium hydrosulfide followed by acidification, or more recently with sodium sulfide. 2-chloropyridine N-oxide itself can be prepared from 2-chloropyridine using peracetic acid. Another approach involves treating the same starting N-oxide with thiourea to afford pyridyl-2-isothiouronium chloride N-oxide which undergoes base hydrolysis to pyrithione. 2-Bromopyridine can be oxidised to its N-oxide using a suitable peracid (as per 2-chloropyridine), both approaches being analogous to that reported in Organic Syntheses for the oxidation of pyridine to its N-oxide. A substitution reaction using either sodium dithionite (Na_{2}S_{2}O_{4}) or sodium sulfide with sodium hydroxide will allow the replacement of the bromo substituent with a thiol functional group.

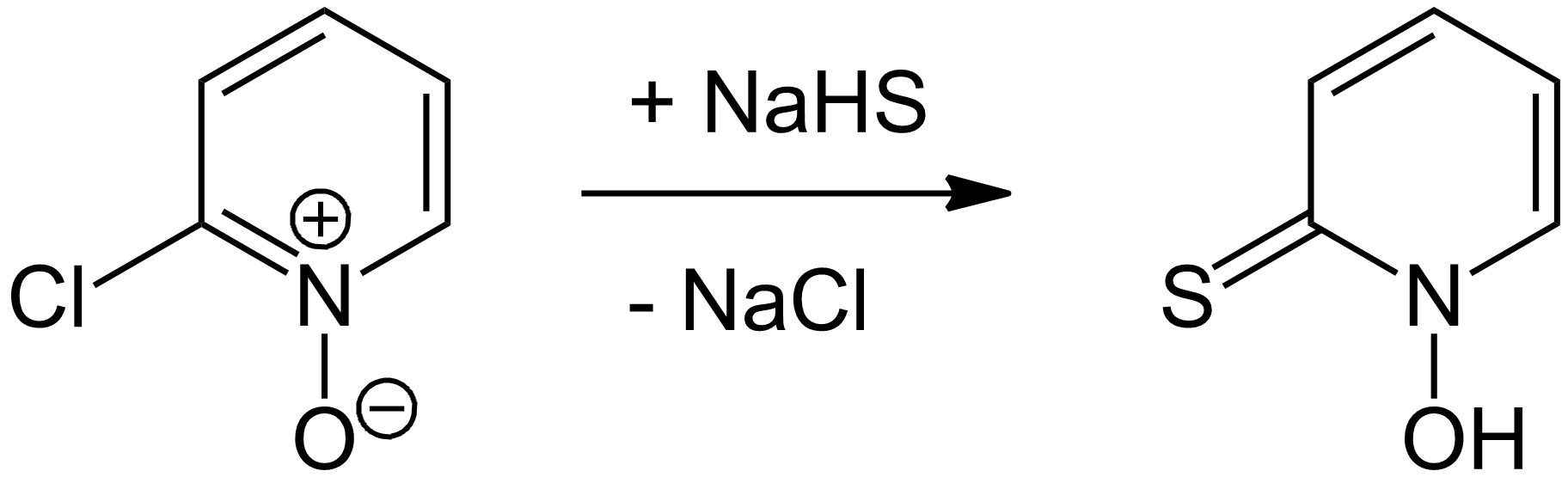

The alternative strategy is to form the mercaptan before introducing the N-oxide moiety. 2-Mercaptopyridine was originally synthesized in 1931 by heating 2-chloropyridine with calcium hydrosulfide, an approach similar that first used to prepare pyrithione. The analogous thiourea approach via a uronium salt was reported in 1958 and provides a more convenient route to 2-mercaptopyridine. Oxidation to the N-oxide can then be undertaken.

The disulfide dipyrithione, 2,2'-dithiobis(pyridine-N-oxide)

Pyrithione is found as a natural product in the Allium stipitatum plant, an Asian species of onion, also known as the Persian shallot. Its presence was detected using positive ion mass spectrometry using a DART ion source and the disulfide dipyrithione (2,2'-disulfanediylbis(pyridine)-1,1'-dioxide) has been reported from the same species. Dipyrithione can be prepared in a laboratory by oxidation of pyrithione with chlorine in the presence of sodium hydroxide:

2 C_{5}H_{4}NOSH + Cl_{2} + 2 NaOH → ONC_{5}H_{4}–S–S–C_{5}H_{4}NO + 2 NaCl + 2 H_{2}O

Dipyrithione is used as a fungicide and bactericide, and has been reported to possess novel cytotoxic activity by inducing apoptosis. However, as apoptosis only occurs in higher organisms, this mechanism isn't relevant to the antifungal and bactericidal properties of pyrithione.

== Properties ==
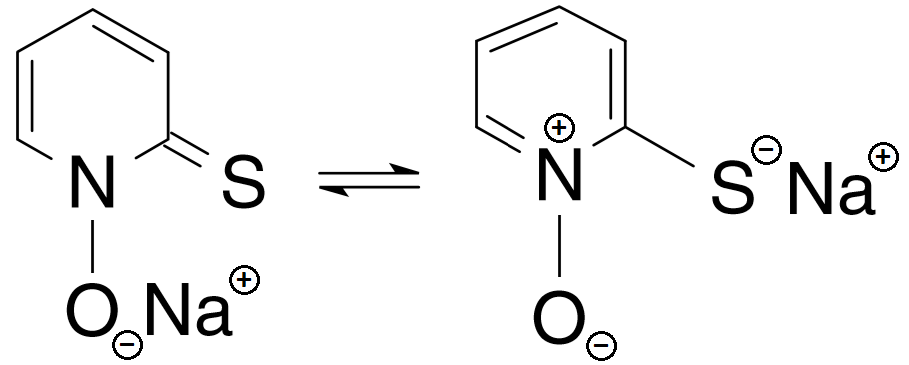
Tautomerisation of the sodium salt of pyrithione (thione form on the left, thiolate form on the right)

Pyrithione exists as a pair of prototropes, a form of tautomerism whereby the rapid interconversion of constitutional isomers involves the shift of a single proton, in this case between the sulfur and oxygen atoms (shown in the infobox above).

Salts of the conjugate base of pyrithione can also be considered to exhibit tautomerism by notionally associating the sodium ion with whichever heteroatom bears the negative charge of the anion (as opposed to the formal charges associated with the N-oxide); however, considering the anion alone, this could also be described as an example of resonance.

Pyrithione is a weak acid with pK_{a} values of −1.95 and +4.6 (thiol proton), but is a markedly stronger acid than either of its parent compounds (pyridine-N-oxide and pyridine-2-thiol), both of which have pK_{a} > 8. It is only slightly soluble in water (2.5 g L^{−1}) but is soluble in many organic solvents (including benzene, chloroform, dichloromethane, dimethylformamide, dimethylsulfoxide, and ethyl acetate) and slight solubility in others (diethyl ether, ethanol, methyl tert-butyl ether, and tetrahydrofuran).

Pyrithione can be used as a source of hydroxyl radical in organic synthesis as it photochemically decomposes to HO^{•} and (pyridin-2-yl)sulfanyl radical.

== Applications ==
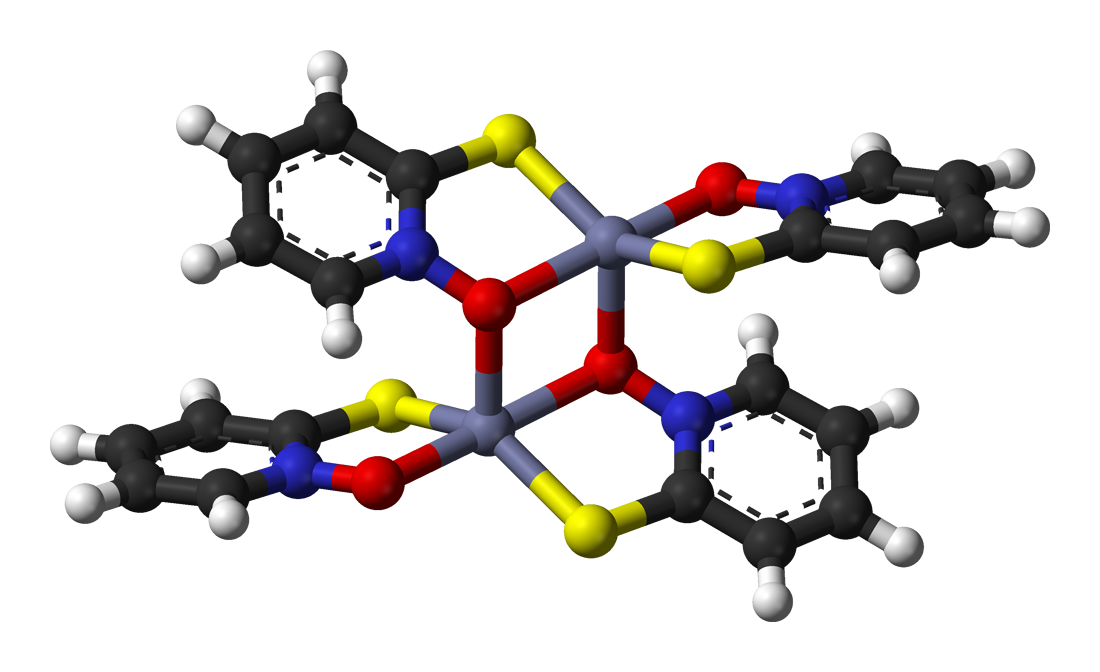
Structures of 1:2 complexes of zinc and the conjugate base of pyrithione
Top: Structural formula of the monomer
Bottom: Ball-and-stick model of the dimer

The conjugate base of pyrithione (pyrithionate ion) is an anion containing two donor atoms, a sulfur atom and an oxygen atom each bearing a negative formal charge; the nitrogen atom remains formally positively charged. The thiolate anion can be formed by reaction with sodium carbonate, and zinc pyrithione is formed when zinc chloride is added. The anion can act as either a monodentate or bidentate ligand and forms a 1:2 complex with a zinc(II) metal centre. Zinc pyrithione has been used since the 1930s though its preparation was not disclosed until a 1955 British patent in which pyrithione was reacted directly with hydrated zinc sulfate in ethanol. In its monomeric form, zinc pyrithione has two of the anions chelated to a zinc centre with a tetrahedral geometry. In the solid state, it forms a dimer in which each zinc centre adopts a trigonal bipyramidal geometry with two of the anions acting as bridging ligands coordinated through the oxygen atoms in the axial positions. In solution, the dimers dissociate via scission of zinc-oxygen bonds to each bridging ligand. Further dissociation of the monomer into its constituents can occur and is undesirable as the complex is more potent in medical applications; for this reason, zinc carbonate can be added to formulations as it inhibits the monomer dissociation.

Zinc pyrithione has a long history of use in medicated shampoos to treat dandruff and seborrhoeic dermatitis (dandruff can be considered a mild form of seborrheic dermatitis). It exhibits both antifungal and antimicrobial properties, inhibiting the Malassezia yeasts which promote these scalp conditions. The mechanisms by which this work are the subject of ongoing study. It can be used as an antibacterial agent against Staphylococcus and Streptococcus infections for conditions such as athlete's foot, eczema, psoriasis, and ringworm. It is known to be cytotoxic against Pityrosporum ovale, especially in combination with ketoconazole, which is the preferred formulation for seborrheic dermatitis. Pyrithione itself inhibits membrane transport processes in fungi.

Paints used in external environments sometimes include zinc pyrithione as a preventive against algae and mildew.
