= 2-Chloropyridine =

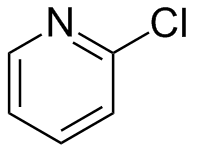

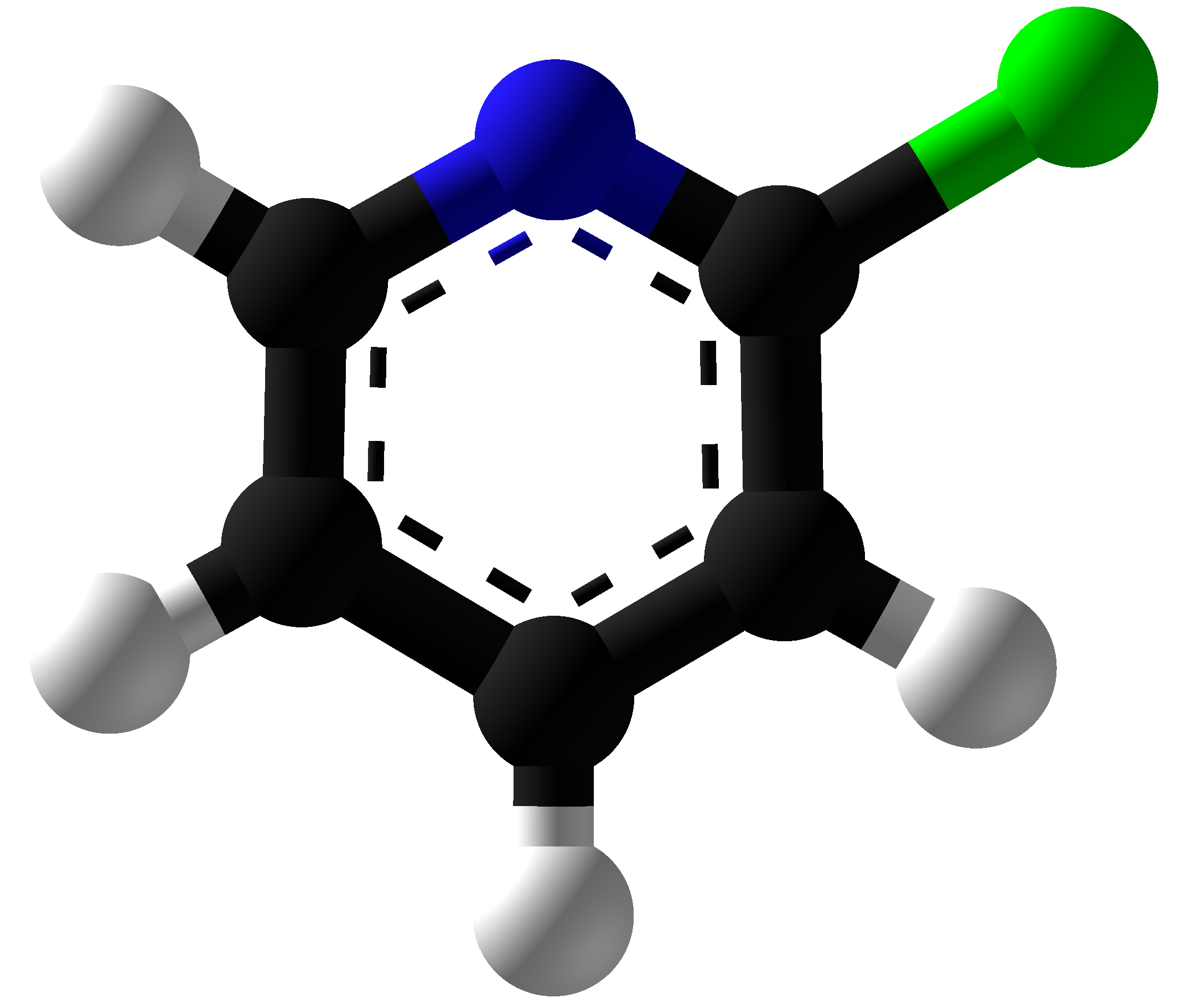

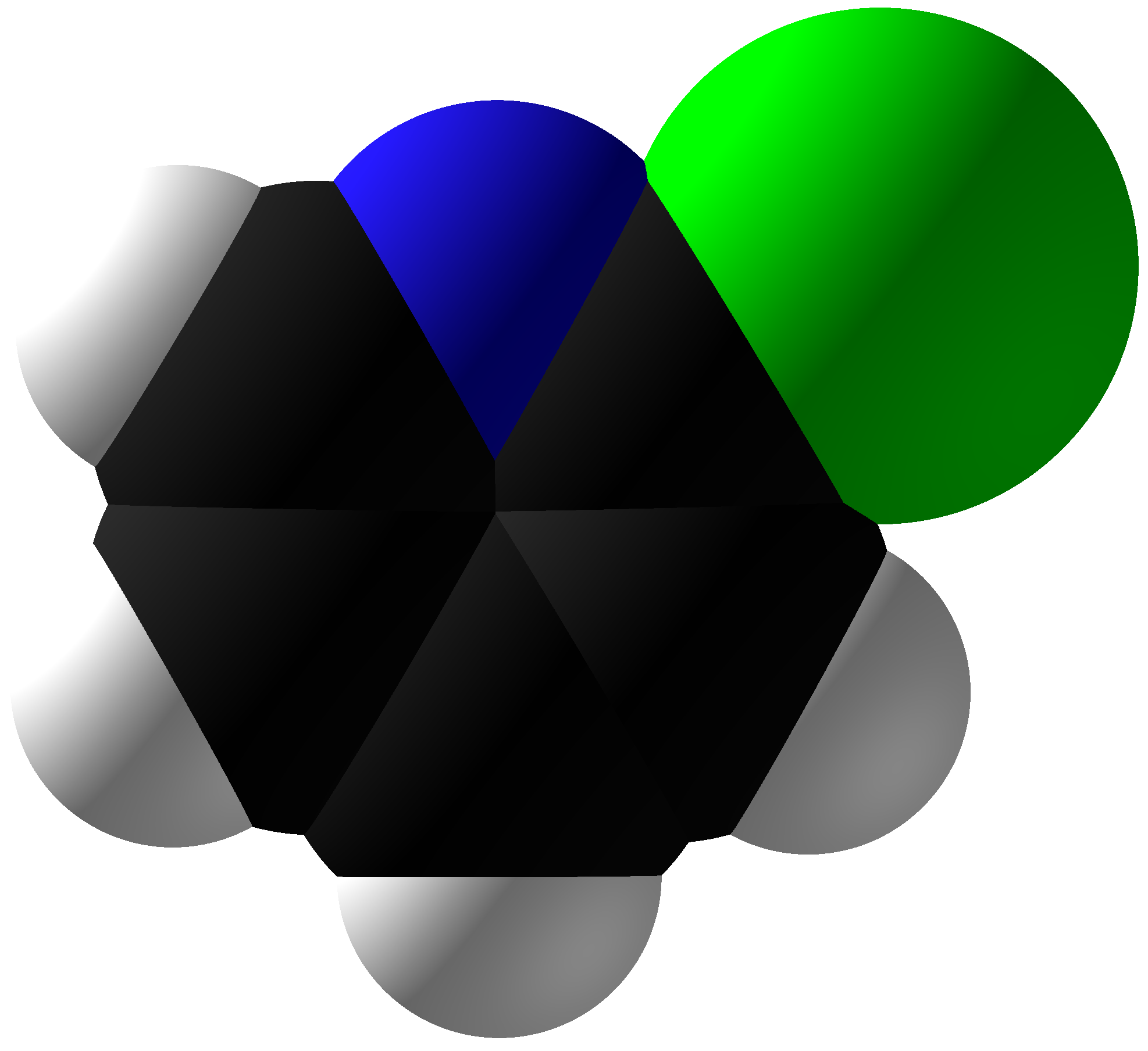

Names
- Preferred IUPAC name 2-Chloropyridine

Identifiers
CAS Number	109-09-1
3D model (JSmol)	Interactive image
Beilstein Reference	105788
ChEBI	CHEBI:39174
ChEMBL	ChEMBL509579
ChemSpider	7689
ECHA InfoCard	100.003.316
EC Number	203-646-3
Gmelin Reference	130818
PubChem CID	7977
RTECS number	US5950000
UNII	8HMD45AYEJ
UN number	2822
CompTox Dashboard (EPA)	DTXSID8024810
- InChI: InChI=1S/C5H4ClN/c6-5-3-1-2-4-7-5/h1-4H Key: OKDGRDCXVWSXDC-UHFFFAOYSA-N; InChI=1/C5H4ClN/c6-5-3-1-2-4-7-5/h1-4H Key: OKDGRDCXVWSXDC-UHFFFAOYAI
- SMILES: Clc1ncccc1

Properties
Chemical formula	C_{5}H_{4}ClN
Molar mass	113.54 g·mol^{−1}
Appearance	colorless liquid
Density	1.2 g/mL
Melting point	−46 °C (−51 °F; 227 K)
Boiling point	166 °C (331 °F; 439 K)
Solubility in water	27 g/L
Acidity (pK_{a})	0.49 (for C_{5}H_{4}ClNH^{+})

Hazards
- GHS labelling
Pictograms	(GHS05: Corrosive) (GHS06: Toxic) (GHS07: Exclamation mark) (GHS08: Health hazard) (GHS09: Environmental hazard)
Signal word	Danger
Hazard statements	H301, H310, H315, H319, H330, H400
Precautionary statements	P260, P262, P264, P270, P271, P273, P280, P284, P301+P310, P301+P312, P302+P350, P302+P352, P304+P340, P305+P351+P338, P310, P311, P312, P314, P320, P321, P330, P332+P313, P337+P313, P361, P362, P363, P391, P403+P233, P405, P501
Safety data sheet (SDS)	MSDS

Related compounds
Related compounds	3-Chloropyridine; 3-Bromopyridine; 2-Chloromethylpyridine
- Except where otherwise noted, data are given for materials in their standard state (at 25 °C [77 °F], 100 kPa). verify (what is ?) Infobox references

2-Chloropyridine is an organic compound with the fomula ClC_{5}H_{4}N. It is a colorless liquid that is mainly used to generate fungicides and insecticides in industry. It also serves to generate antihistamines and antiarrythymics for pharmaceutical purposes. It is one of three isomers of chloropyridine.

== Preparation ==
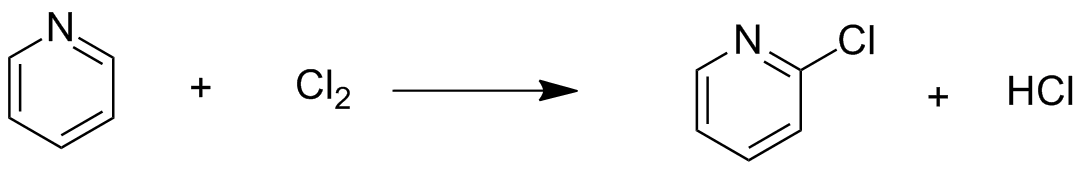

2-Chloropyridine is produced by direct reaction of pyridine with chlorine.

Alternatively, 2-chloropyridines can be conveniently synthesized in high yields from pyridine-N-oxides.

2-Chloropyridine was originally prepared by the chlorination of 2-hydroxypyridine with phosphoryl chloride.

== Main reactions and applications ==
2-Chloropyridine reacts further with chlorine to give 2,6-dichloropyridine.

2-Chloropyridine undergoes substitution at the C-Cl bond.

Some commercial products include pyrithione, pyripropoxyfen, chlorphenamine, and disopyramide. In these conversions, chloride is displaced. Pyrithione, the conjugate base of 2-mercaptopyridine-N-oxide, is a fungicide found in some shampoos. Oxidation 2-chloropyridine gives 2-chloropyridine-N-oxide. The antihistamine pheniramine may be generated via the reaction of phenylacetonitrile with 2-chloropyridine in the presence of a base.

== Environmental properties ==
Although pyridine is an excellent source of carbon, nitrogen, and energy for certain microorganisms, introduction of a halogen moiety significantly retards degradation of the pyridine ring. With the exception of 4-chloropyridine, each of the mono- and di-substituted chloropyridines were found to be relatively resistant to microbiological degradation in soil or liquid media. Estimated time for complete degradation was > 30 days. 2-Chloropyridine exhibits extensive volatilization losses from water, less so when present in soil.

== Toxicity ==
The LD_{50} is 64 mg/kg (dermal, rabbit).
