= Dithionous acid =

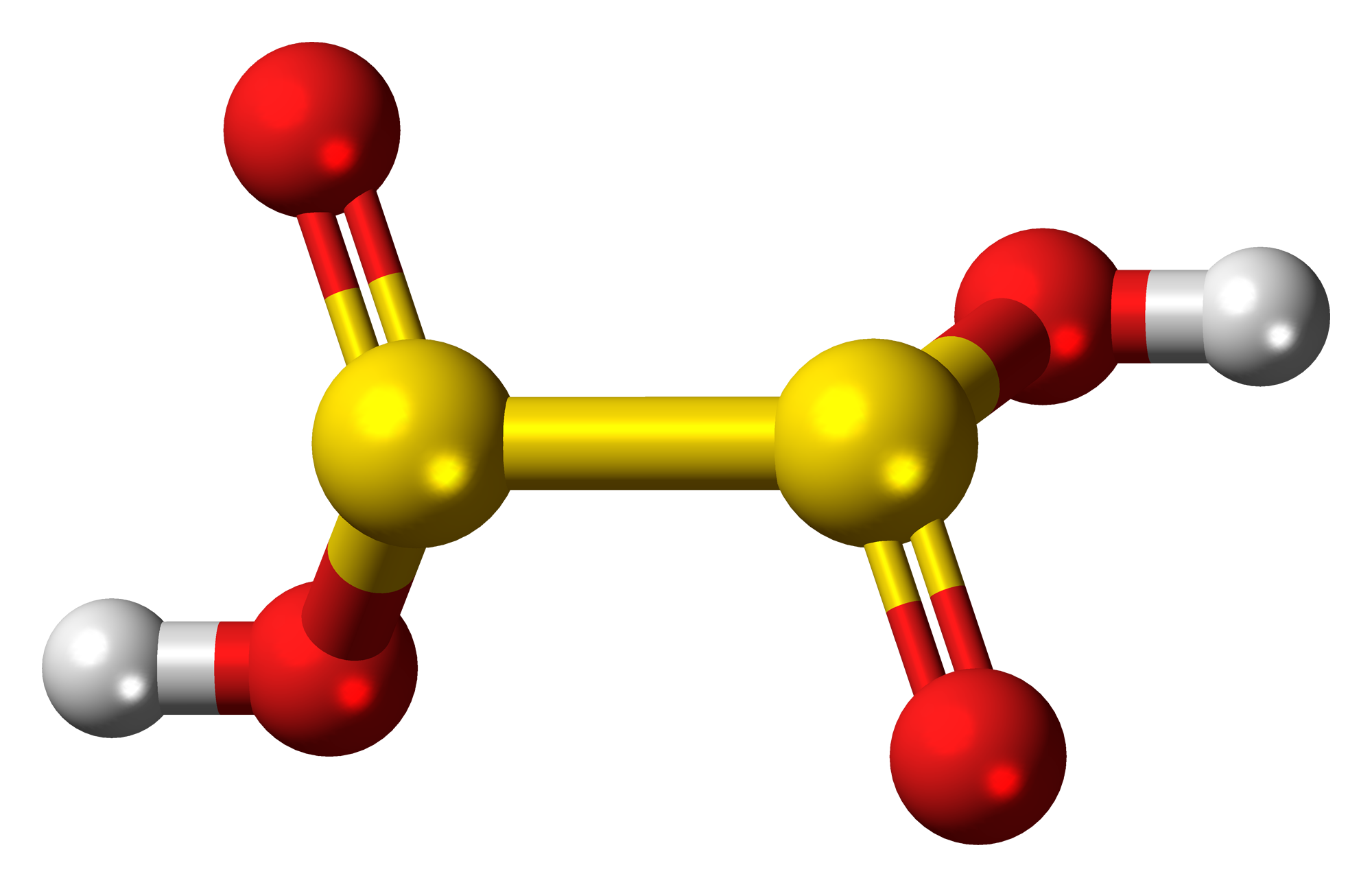

Names
- IUPAC name Dithionous acid
- Other names Hydrosulfurous acid; Hyposulfurous acid

Identifiers
CAS Number	15959-26-9
3D model (JSmol)	Interactive image
ChEBI	CHEBI:29253
ChemSpider	22898
PubChem CID	24490
CompTox Dashboard (EPA)	DTXSID70274771
- InChI: InChI=1S/H2O4S2/c1-5(2)6(3)4/h(H,1,2)(H,3,4) Key: GRWZHXKQBITJKP-UHFFFAOYSA-N; InChI=1/H2O4S2/c1-5(2)6(3)4/h(H,1,2)(H,3,4) Key: GRWZHXKQBITJKP-UHFFFAOYAX
- SMILES: O=S(O)S(=O)O

Properties
Chemical formula	H_{2}S_{2}O_{4}
Molar mass	130.144 g/mol
Acidity (pK_{a})	0.35, 2.45
Conjugate base	Dithionite

Related compounds
Related compounds	Oxalic acid Sodium dithionite Potassium dithionite
- Except where otherwise noted, data are given for materials in their standard state (at 25 °C [77 °F], 100 kPa). verify (what is ?) Infobox references

Dithionous acid is a sulfur oxoacid with the chemical formula H_{2}S_{2}O_{4}. It has not been observed experimentally. It is the conjugate acid of the dithionite dianion, S_{2}O_{4}^{2-}. Dithionite is a well-known reducing agent.

== Related compounds ==
- Dithionic acid (H_{2}S_{2}O_{6}), another unstable protonated sulfur oxide, derived from dithionate.
