= List of UN numbers 1901 to 2000 =

UN numbers from UN1901 to UN2000 as assigned by the United Nations Committee of Experts on the Transport of Dangerous Goods are as follows:

== UN 1901 to UN 2000 ==
UN Number	Class	Proper Shipping Name
UN 1901	?	(UN No. no longer in use)
UN 1902	8	Diisooctyl acid phosphate
UN 1903	8	Disinfectants, liquid, corrosive, n.o.s.
UN 1904	?	(UN No. no longer in use) Poison Hydrochloride (UN No. no longer in use)
UN 1905	8	Selenic Acid
UN 1906	8	Sludge Acid
UN 1907	8	Soda lime with more than 4 percent sodium hydroxide
UN 1908	8	Chlorite solution
UN 1909	?	(UN No. no longer in use)
UN 1910	8	Calcium oxide
UN 1911	2	Diborane, compressed
UN 1912	2	Methyl chloride and methylene chloride mixtures
UN 1913	2	Neon, refrigerated liquid (cryogenic liquid)
UN 1914	3	Butyl propionates
UN 1915	3	Cyclohexanone
UN 1916	6.1	2,2'-Dichlorodiethyl ether
UN 1917	3	Ethyl acrylate, inhibited
UN 1918	3	Isopropylbenzene
UN 1919	3	Methyl acrylate, inhibited
UN 1920	3	Nonanes
UN 1921	3	Propyleneimine, inhibited
UN 1922	3	Pyrrolidine
UN 1923	4.2	Calcium dithionite or Calcium hydrosulfite
UN 1924	?	(UN No. no longer in use) Ethyl aluminium dichloride (UN No. no longer in use)
UN 1925	?	(UN No. no longer in use) Ethylaluminium sesquichloride (UN No. no longer in use)
UN 1926	?	(UN No. no longer in use) Methyl aluminium sesquibromide (UN No. no longer in use)
UN 1927	?	(UN No. no longer in use) Methyl aluminium sesquichloride (UN No. no longer in use)
UN 1928	4.3	Methyl magnesium bromide, in ethyl ether
UN 1929	4.2	Potassium dithionite or Potassium hydrosulfite
UN 1930	?	(UN No. no longer in use) Triisobutyl aluminium (UN No. no longer in use)
UN 1931	9	Zinc dithionite or Zinc hydrosulfite
UN 1932	4.2	Zirconium scrap
UN 1933 to 1934	?	(UN No.s no longer in use)
UN 1935	6.1	Cyanide solutions, n.o.s.
UN 1936 to 1937	?	(UN No.s no longer in use)
UN 1938	8	Bromoacetic acid, solution or Bromoacetic acid, solid
UN 1939	8	Phosphorus oxybromide
UN 1940	8	Thioglycolic acid
UN 1941	9	Dibromodifluoromethane, R12B2
UN 1942	5.1	Ammonium nitrate, with not more than 0.2 percent of combustible substances, including any organic substance calculated as carbon, to the exclusion of any other added substance
UN 1943	?	(UN No. no longer in use)
UN 1944	4.1	Matches, safety (book, card, or strike on box)
UN 1945	4.1	Matches, wax, Vesta
UN 1946 to 1949	?	(UN No.s no longer in use)
UN 1950	2	Aerosols, corrosive, Packing Group II or III, (each not exceeding 1 L capacity) or Aerosols, flammable (each not exceeding 1 L capacity) or Aerosols, flammable, n.o.s. (engine starting fluid) (each not exceeding 1 L capacity) or Aerosols, nonflammable (each not exceeding 1 L capacity) or Aerosols, toxic, (each not exceeding 1 L capacity)
UN 1951	2	Argon, refrigerated liquid (cryogenic liquid)
UN 1952	2	Ethylene oxide and carbon dioxide mixtures with not more than 9 percent ethylene oxide
UN 1953	2	Compressed gas, toxic, flammable, n.o.s. Inhalation Hazard Zone A, B, C, or D
UN 1954	2	Compressed gas, flammable, n.o.s.
UN 1955	2	Compressed gas, toxic, n.o.s. Inhalation Hazard Zone A, B, C, or D
UN 1956	2	Compressed gas, n.o.s.
UN 1957	2	Deuterium, compressed
UN 1958	2	1,2-dichloro-1,1,2,2-tetrafluoroethane or Refrigerant gas R 114
UN 1959	2	1,1-Difluoroethylene or Refrigerant gas R 1132a
UN 1960	?	(UN No. no longer in use) Engine starting fluid (UN No. no longer in use)
UN 1961	2	Ethane, refrigerated liquid
UN 1962	2	Ethylene, compressed
UN 1963	2	Helium, refrigerated liquid (cryogenic liquid)
UN 1964	2	Hydrocarbon gas mixture, compressed, n.o.s.
UN 1965	2	Hydrocarbon gas mixtures, liquefied, n.o.s.
UN 1966	2	Liquid hydrogen, refrigerated liquid (cryogenic liquid)
UN 1967	2	Insecticide gases, toxic, n.o.s.
UN 1968	2	Insecticide gases, n.o.s.
UN 1969	2	Isobutane see also Petroleum gases, liquified
UN 1970	2	Krypton, refrigerated liquid (cryogenic liquid)
UN 1971	2	Methane, compressed or Natural gas, compressed (with high methane content)
UN 1972	2	Methane, refrigerated liquid (cryogenic liquid) or Natural gas, refrigerated liquid (cryogenic liquid), with high methane content
UN 1973	2	Chlorodifluoromethane and chloropentafluoroethane mixture or Refrigerant gas R 502 with fixed boiling point, with approximately 49 percent chlorodifluoromethane
UN 1974	2	Chlorodifluorobromomethane or Refrigerant gas R 12B1
UN 1975	2	Nitric oxide and dinitrogen tetroxide mixtures or Nitric oxide and nitrogen dioxide mixtures
UN 1976	2	Octafluorocyclobutane, or Refrigerant gas RC 318
UN 1977	2	Nitrogen, refrigerated liquid cryogenic liquid
UN 1978	2.1	Propane see also Petroleum gases, liquefied
UN 1979	2	(UN No. no longer in use) Rare gases, mixtures, compressed (UN No. no longer in use)
UN 1980	2	(UN No. no longer in use) Rare gases and oxygen mixtures, compressed (UN No. no longer in use)
UN 1981	2	(UN No. no longer in use) Rare gases and nitrogen mixtures, compressed (UN No. no longer in use)
UN 1982	2	Tetrafluoromethane, compressed or Refrigerant gas R 14
UN 1983	2	1-Chloro-2,2,2-trifluoroethane or Refrigerant gas R133a
UN 1984	2	Trifluoromethane or Refrigerant gas R 23
UN 1985	?	(UN No. no longer in use)
UN 1986	3	Alcohols, flammable, toxic, n.o.s.
UN 1987	3	Alcohols, (Ethanol), n.o.s.
UN 1988	3	Aldehydes, flammable, toxic, n.o.s.
UN 1989	3	Aldehydes, n.o.s.
UN 1990	9	Benzaldehyde
UN 1991	3	Chloroprene, inhibited
UN 1992	3	Flammable liquids, toxic, n.o.s.
UN 1993	3	Flammable liquids, n.o.s.
UN 1994	6.1	Iron pentacarbonyl
UN 1995	?	Propane
UN 1996 to 1998	?	(UN No.s no longer in use)
UN 1999	3	Tars, liquid including road asphalt and oils, bitumen and cut backs
UN 2000	4.1	Celluloid, in block, rods, rolls, sheets, tubes, etc., except scrap

n.o.s. = not otherwise specified meaning a collective entry to which substances, mixtures, solutions or articles may be assigned if a) they are not mentioned by name in 3.2 Dangerous Goods List AND b) they exhibit chemical, physical and/or dangerous properties corresponding to the Class, classification code, packing group and the name and description of the n.o.s.entry

== See also ==
- Lists of UN numbers
