= Dithionite =

Oxyanion of sulfur at the oxidation number +3

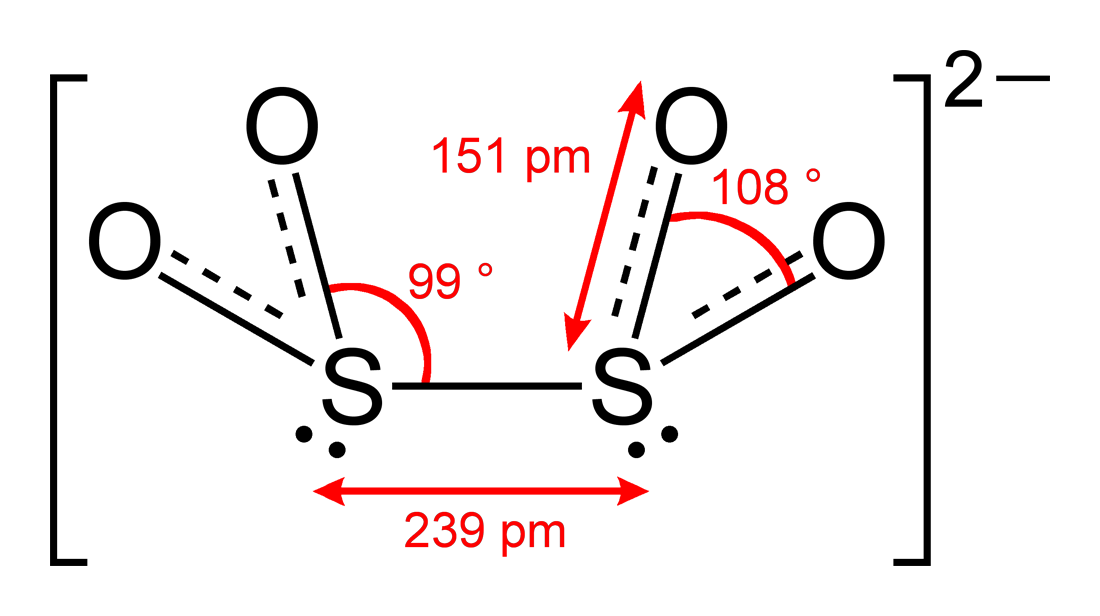
The unusual structure of the dithionite anion. It has a remarkably long sulfur-sulfur bond.

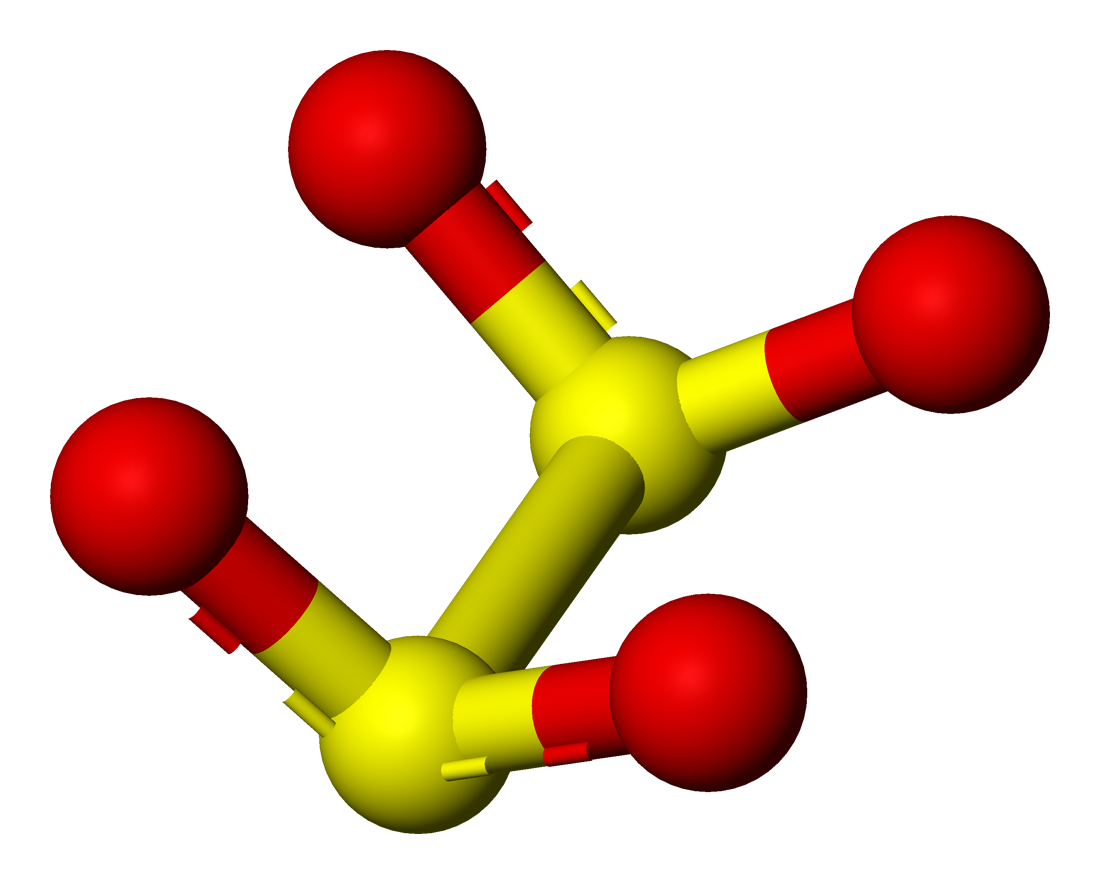
A ball-and-stick model of the dithionite ion.

Dithionite is the oxyanion with the formula [S_{2}O_{4}]^{2−}. It is commonly encountered as the salt sodium dithionite. For historical reasons, it is sometimes called hydrosulfite, but it contains no hydrogen and is not a sulfite. The dianion has a steric number of 4 and trigonal pyramidal geometry.

== Production and reactions ==
In its main applications, dithionite is generally prepared in situ by reduction of sulfur dioxide by sodium borohydride, described by the following idealized equation:

NaBH_{4} + 8 SO_{2} + 8 NaOH → 4 Na_{2}S_{2}O_{4} + NaBO_{2} + 6 H_{2}O

Dithionite is a reducing agent. At pH 7, its reduction potential is −0.66 V vs SHE. Its oxidation occurs with formation of sulfite:

S_{2}O^{2−}_{4} + 2 H_{2}O → 2 HSO^{−}_{3} + 2 e^{−} + 2 H^{+}

Dithionite undergoes acid hydrolytic disproportionation to thiosulfate and bisulfite:

2 S_{2}O^{2−}_{4} + H_{2}O → S_{2}O^{2−}_{3} + 2 HSO^{−}_{3}

It also undergoes alkaline hydrolytic disproportionation to sulfite and sulfide:

3 Na_{2}S_{2}O_{4} + 6 NaOH → 5 Na_{2}SO_{3} + Na_{2}S + 3 H_{2}O

It is formally derived from dithionous acid (H_{2}S_{2}O_{4}), but this acid does not exist in any practical sense.

== Use and occurrence ==
Sodium dithionite finds widespread use in industry as a reducing agent. It is for example used in bleaching of wood pulp and some dyes.

=== Chemical analyses ===
Dithionite is used in conjunction with complexing agents (for example, citric acid) to reduce iron(III) oxy-hydroxide into soluble iron(II) compounds and to remove amorphous iron(III)-bearing mineral phases in soil analyses (selective extraction).

=== Harmful properties ===
The decomposition of dithionite produces reduced species of sulfur that can be very aggressive for the corrosion of steel and stainless steel. Thiosulfate (S_{2}O^{2−}_{3}) is known to induce pitting corrosion, whereas sulfide (S^{2−}, HS^{−}) is responsible for stress corrosion cracking (SCC).
