= 2-Bromopyridine =

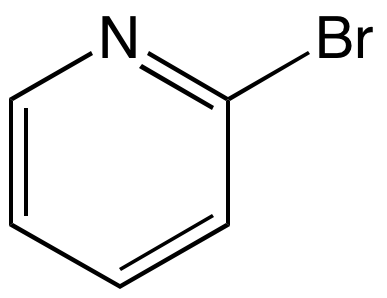

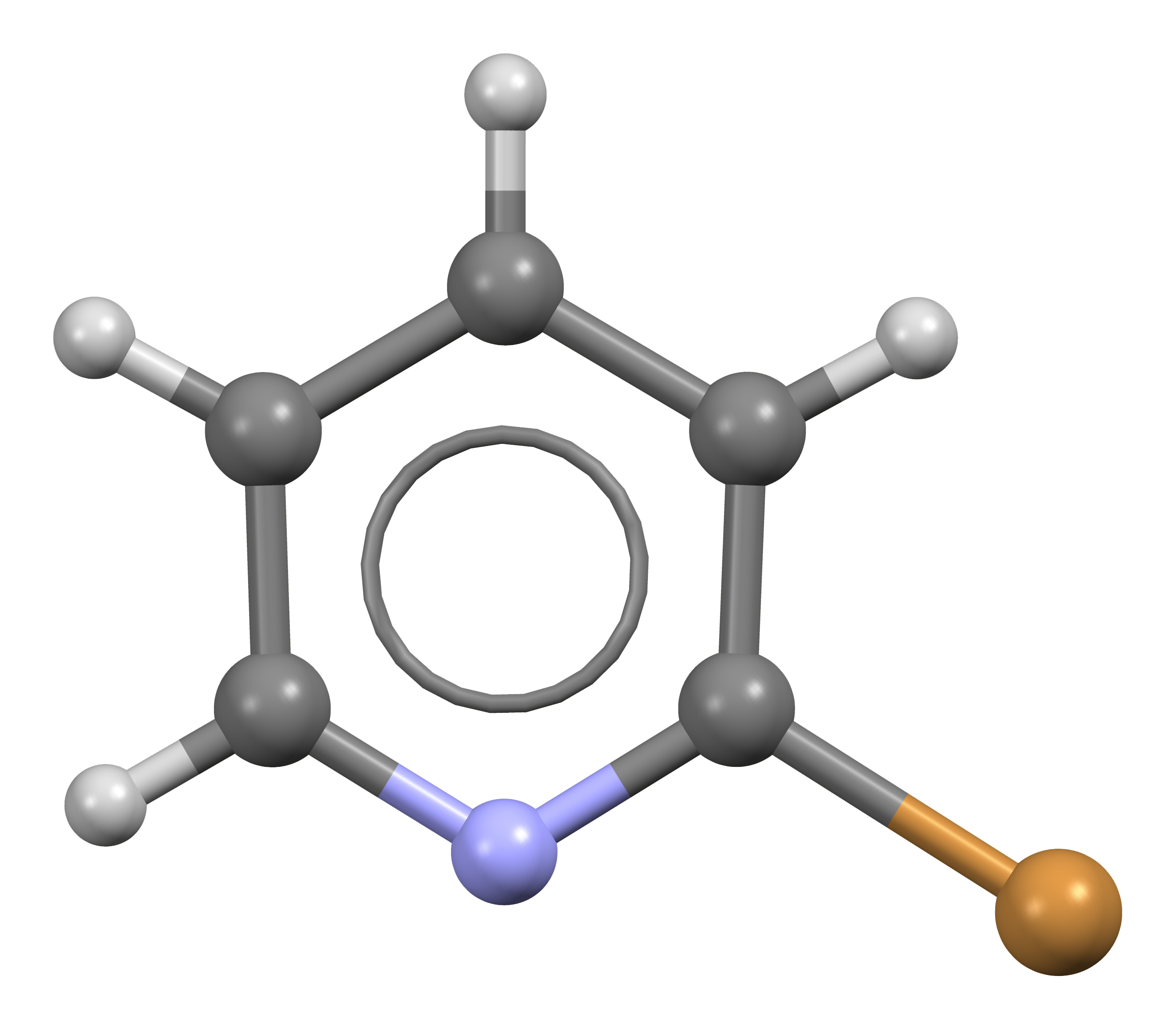

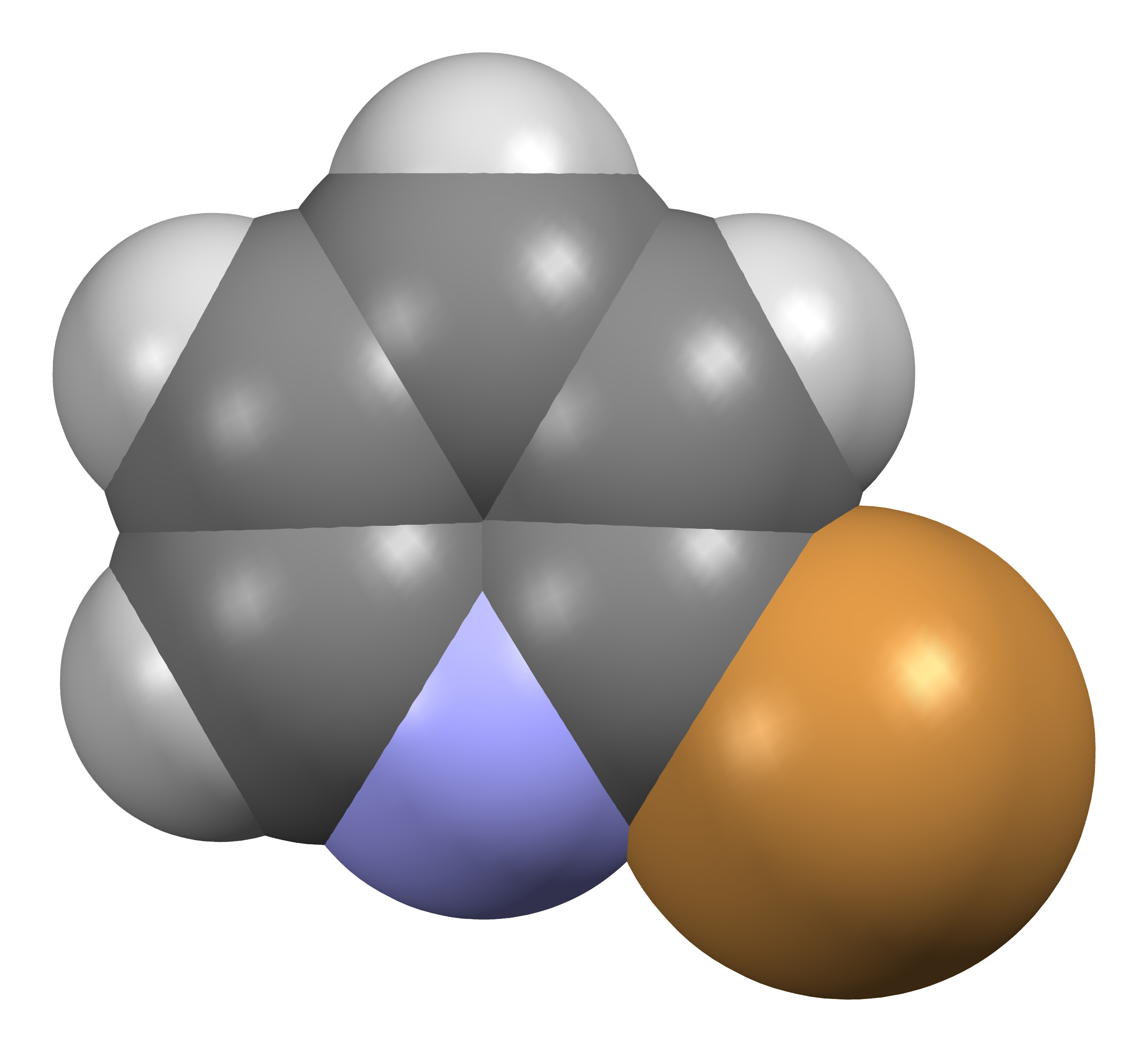

Names
- Preferred IUPAC name 2-Bromopyridine

Identifiers
CAS Number	109-04-6
3D model (JSmol)	Interactive image
ChEBI	CHEBI:51574
ChEMBL	ChEMBL331374
ChemSpider	7685
ECHA InfoCard	100.003.311
EC Number	203-641-6
PubChem CID	7973
UNII	7Z7MLC4VD8
CompTox Dashboard (EPA)	DTXSID6051564
- InChI: InChI=1S/C5H4BrN/c6-5-3-1-2-4-7-5/h1-4H Key: IMRWILPUOVGIMU-UHFFFAOYSA-N; InChI=1/C5H4BrN/c6-5-3-1-2-4-7-5/h1-4H Key: IMRWILPUOVGIMU-UHFFFAOYAP
- SMILES: c1ccnc(c1)Br

Properties
Chemical formula	C_{5}H_{4}NBr
Molar mass	158.00
Appearance	colorless liquid
Boiling point	194.8 °C
Acidity (pK_{a})	0.71 (for C_{5}H_{4}(Br)NH^{+})

Related compounds
Related compounds	2-Chloropyridine; 3-Bromopyridine
- Except where otherwise noted, data are given for materials in their standard state (at 25 °C [77 °F], 100 kPa). Infobox references

2-Bromopyridine is an aryl bromide and isomer of bromopyridine with the formula BrC_{5}H_{4}N. It is a colorless liquid that is used as an intermediate in organic synthesis. It can be prepared from 2-aminopyridine via diazotization followed by bromination.

== Reactions ==
Like 2-chloropyridine, 2-bromopyridine is very weakly basic.

2-Bromopyridine reacts with butyllithium to give 2-lithiopyridine, which is a versatile reagent. Pyrithione can be prepared in a two-step synthesis from 2-bromopyridine by oxidation to the N-oxide with a suitable peracid followed by substitution using either sodium dithionite or sodium sulfide with sodium hydroxide to introduce the thiol functional group.

== Applications ==
Organometallic addition to benzophenone followed by catalytic hydrogenation is the synthesis of pipradrol.
