= 3-Chloropyridine =

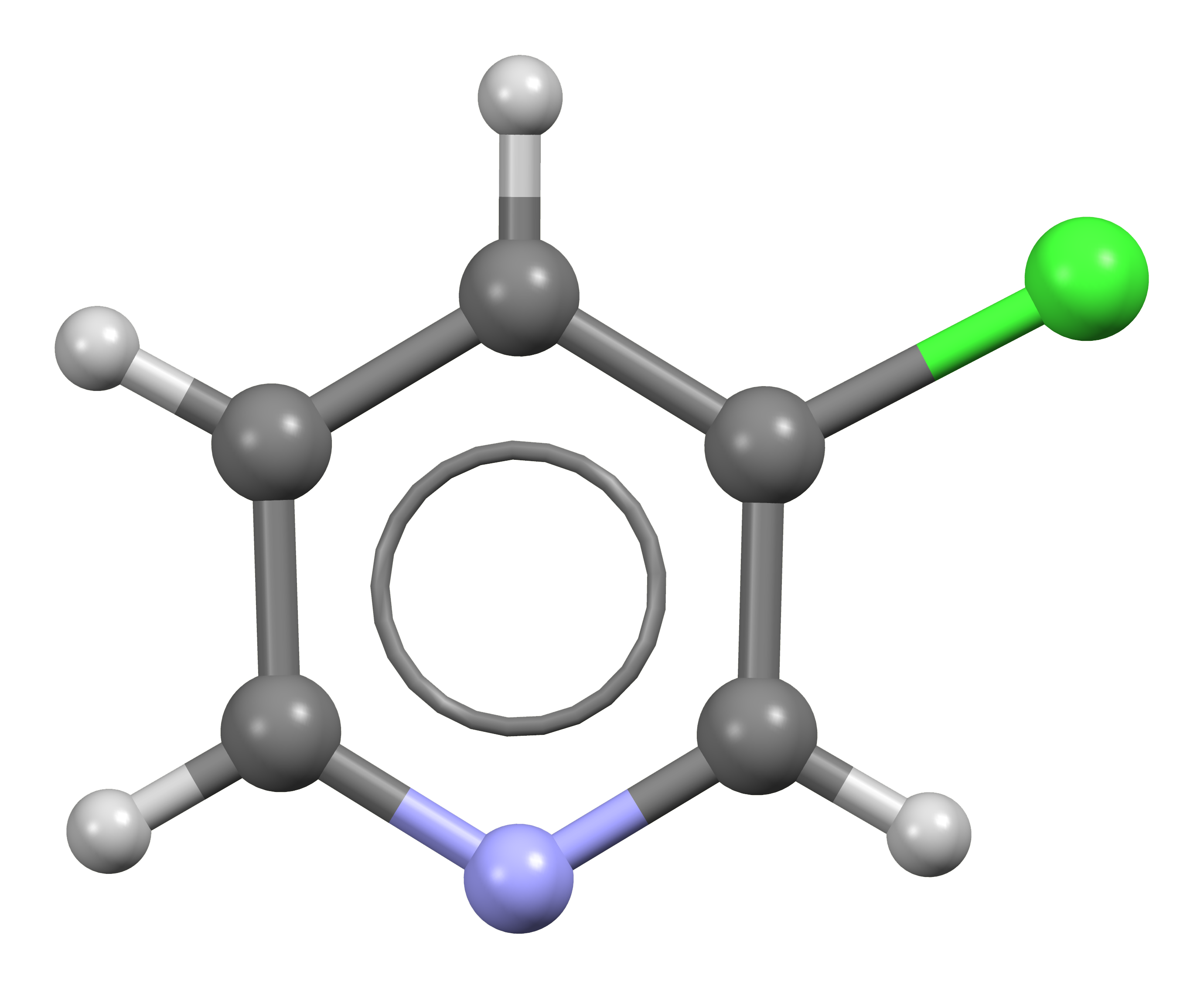

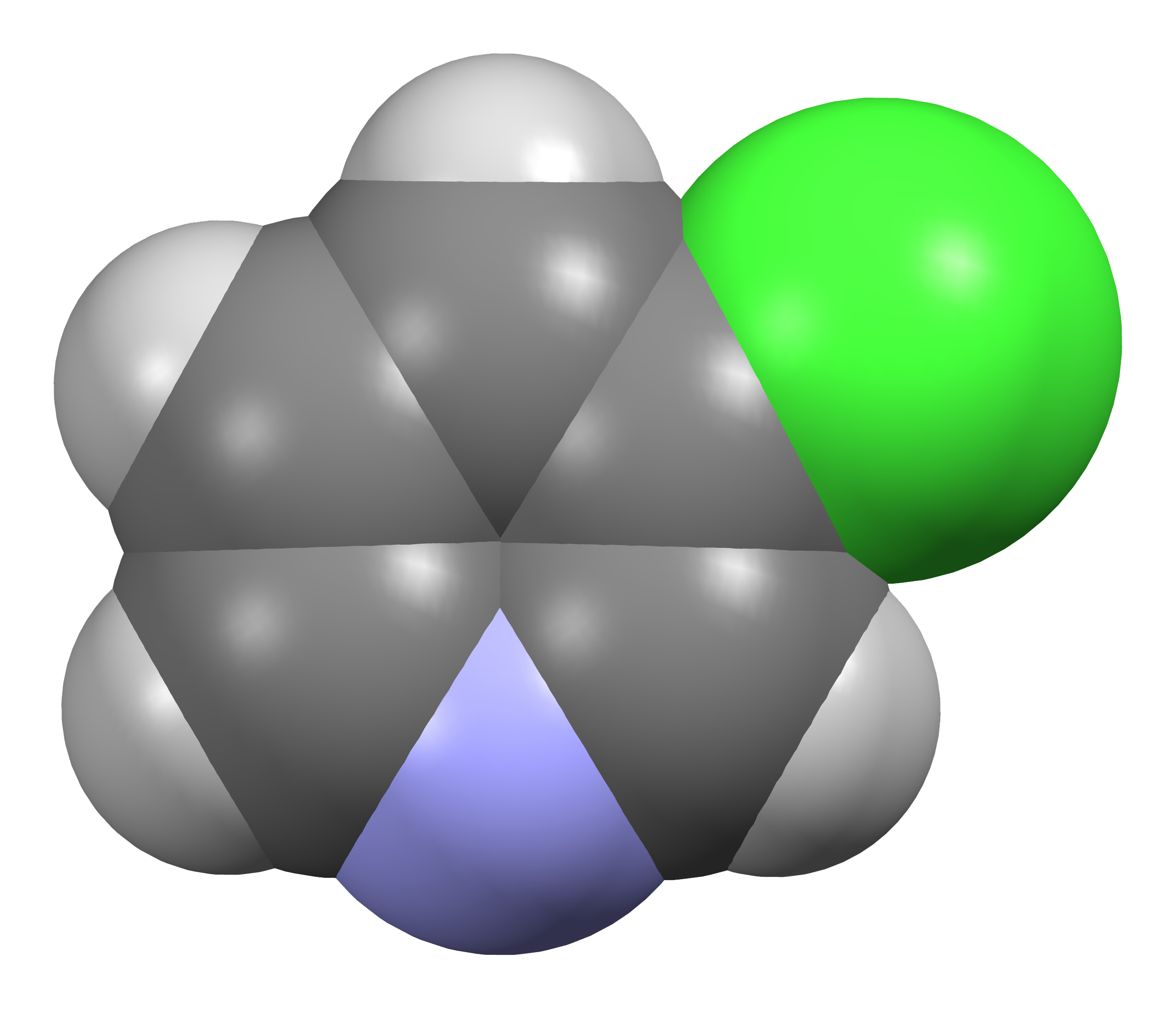

Names
- Preferred IUPAC name 3-Chloropyridine

Identifiers
CAS Number	626-60-8
3D model (JSmol)	Interactive image
ChemSpider	11784
ECHA InfoCard	100.009.960
EC Number	210-955-7
PubChem CID	12287
UNII	1M13HUC1P4
CompTox Dashboard (EPA)	DTXSID3052309
- InChI: InChI=1S/C5H4ClN/c6-5-2-1-3-7-4-5/h1-4H Key: PWRBCZZQRRPXAB-UHFFFAOYSA-N
- SMILES: C1=CC(=CN=C1)Cl

Properties
Chemical formula	C_{5}H_{4}ClN
Molar mass	113.54 g·mol^{−1}
Appearance	colorless liquid
Density	1.194 g/cm^{3}
Boiling point	148 °C (298 °F; 421 K)
Refractive index (n_{D})	1.533

Hazards
- GHS labelling
Pictograms	(GHS02: Flammable) (GHS07: Exclamation mark)
Signal word	Warning
Hazard statements	H226, H302, H312, H315, H332
Precautionary statements	P210, P233, P240, P241, P242, P243, P261, P264, P270, P271, P280, P301+P312, P302+P352, P303+P361+P353, P304+P312, P304+P340, P312, P321, P322, P330, P332+P313, P362, P363, P370+P378, P403+P235, P501
Flash point	65 °C (149 °F; 338 K)

Related compounds
Related compounds	2-Chloropyridine; 3-Bromopyridine
- Except where otherwise noted, data are given for materials in their standard state (at 25 °C [77 °F], 100 kPa). Infobox references

3-Chloropyridine is an aryl chloride and isomer of chloropyridine with the formula C_{5}H_{4}ClN. It is a colorless liquid that is mainly used as a building block in organic synthesis.

The compound is a substrate for many coupling processes including the Heck reaction, Suzuki reaction, and Ullmann reaction.

== Preparation ==
3-Chloropyridine is prepared by the direct chlorination of pyridine with aluminium chloride used as the catalyst. The yield is 33%.

Another way of making 3-chloropyridine consists in the gas phase pyrolysis of a mixture of pyrrole and chloroform (taken in fivefold excess) in an empty glass tube. The yields range from 25 to 33%. A little 2-chloropyridine is formed as a side product. The process is an example of the Ciamician–Dennstedt rearrangement.

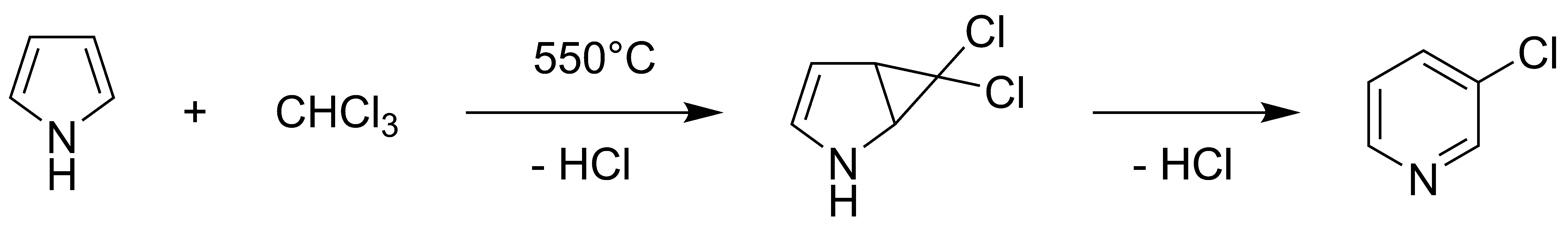
Pyrolytic Ciamician-Dennstedt rearrangement leading to 3-chloropyridine
