= Ciamician–Dennstedt rearrangement =

Name reaction in organic chemistry

The Ciamician–Dennstedt rearrangement is a name reaction in organic chemistry. It was first published in 1881 by the Italian chemist Giacomo Luigi Ciamician and his German colleague Max Dennstedt. The reaction describes the conversion of pyrrole into halogenated pyridines.

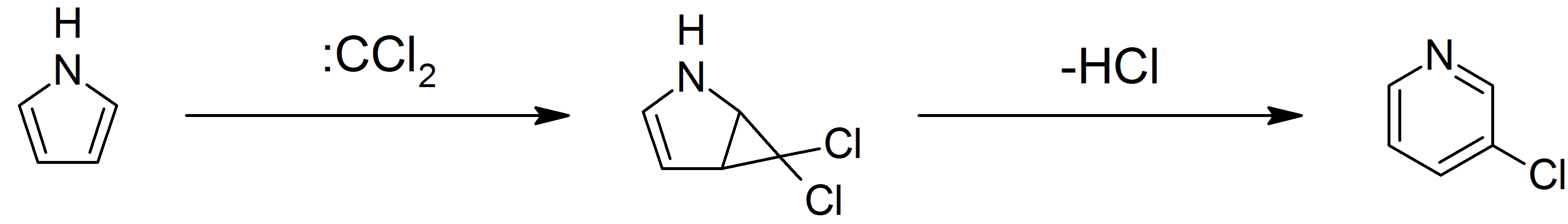
Ciamician–Dennstedt rearrangement

== Mechanism ==
Using the example reaction of chloroform with pyrrole in potassium hydroxide, the mechanism is as follows:

Chloroform (1) reacts in alkaline solution (potassium hydroxide), splitting off water and potassium chloride, to form dichlorocarbene (2):

Ciamician–Dennstedt Mechanismus Dichlorcarben

The dichlorocarbene (2) then reacts with pyrrole (3) and the other base (potassium hydroxide), splitting off water and potassium chloride, to 3-chloropyridine (4):

Ciamician–Dennstedt Mechanismus Pyridin

The Ciamician–Dennstedt rearrangement is not catalyzed.

== Further development ==
Rearrangements proceeding by similar mechanisms have been studied since the original paper by Ciamician and Dennstedt. Treating solutions of pyrrole and indole in dichloromethane with excess methyllithium gives pyridine (32%) and quinoline (13%).

Diazirines are utilized as sources of chlorocarbenes for the synthesis of non-chlorinated pyridines from pyrroles and quinolines from indoles.

Synthesis of quinoline from indole and diazirine
