= Trimethylsilyl pipecolate =

Names
- IUPAC name Trimethylsilyl piperidine-2-carboxylate
- Other names: 2-piperidinecarboxylic acid, trimethylsilyl ester; Pipecolic acid TMS derivative; Pipecolic acid-monoTMS

Identifiers
CAS Number	55887-52-0
3D model (JSmol)	Interactive image
ChemSpider	485591
PubChem CID	558599
- InChI: InChI=1S/C9H19NO2Si/c1-13(2,3)12-9(11)8-6-4-5-7-10-8/h8,10H,4-7H2,1-3H3 Key: FPPDHYMXBHTGOC-UHFFFAOYSA-N
- SMILES: C[Si](C)(C)OC(=O)C1CCCCN1

Properties
Chemical formula	C_{6}H_{10}NO_{2}Si(CH_{3})_{3}
Molar mass	201.341 g·mol^{−1}
- Except where otherwise noted, data are given for materials in their standard state (at 25 °C [77 °F], 100 kPa). Infobox references

Trimethylsilyl pipecolate is a chemical compound. It is the trimethylsilyl ester of the non-proteinogenic amino acid pipecolic acid.

It is used in gas chromatography–mass spectrometry as the product of derivatisation of pipecolic acid with trimethylsilylating agents such as MSTFA. GC-MS analysis of trimethylsilyl pipecolates can be used to analyse presence of pipecolic acids and their hydroxy derivatives.

It also occurs as a reaction intermediate in organic synthesis, where the trimethylsilyl ester acts as a protecting group for the carboxylic acid moiety in reactions targeting the amine.

== Preparation ==
Treatment of pipecolic acid with MSTFA produces trimethylsilyl pipecolate and the N-trimethylsilyl derivative.
