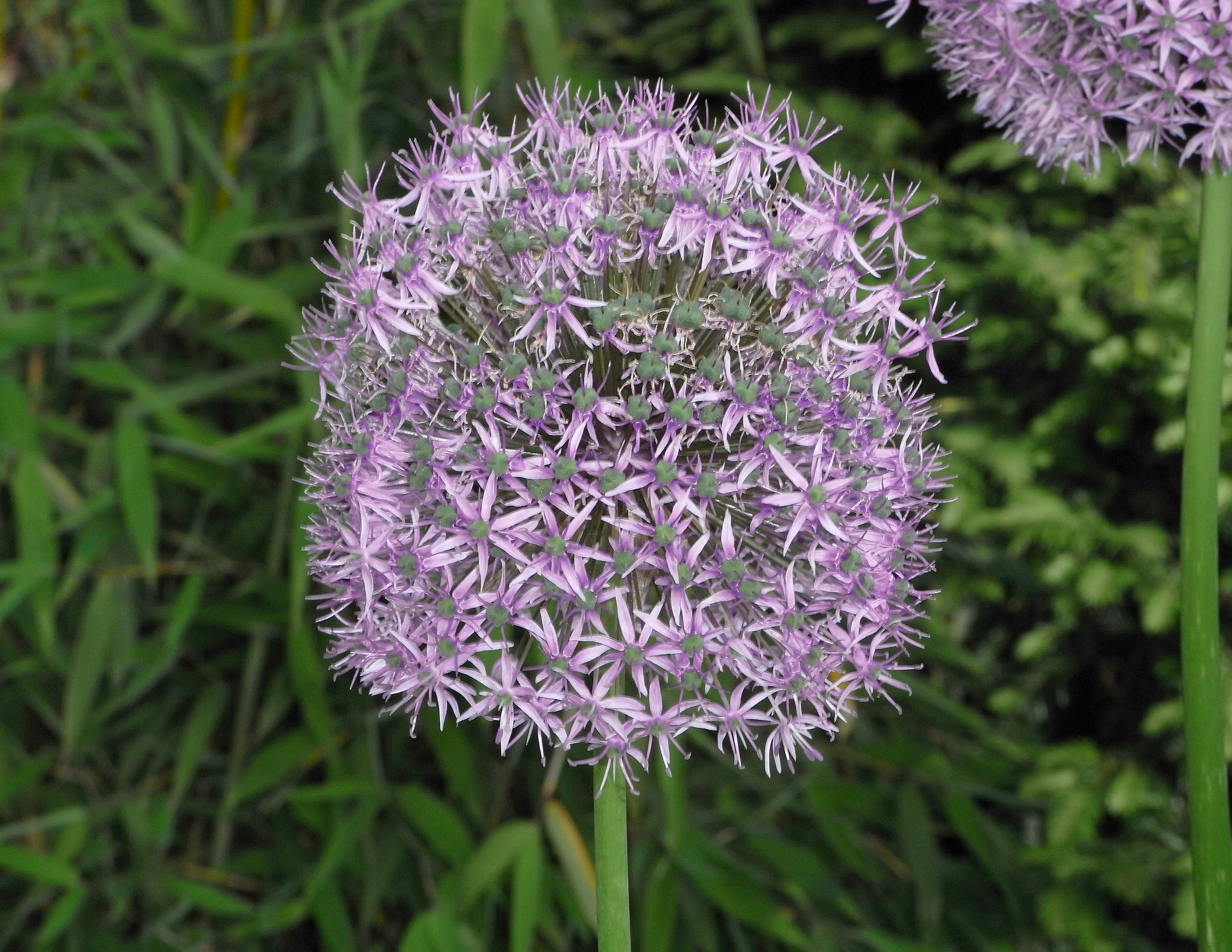

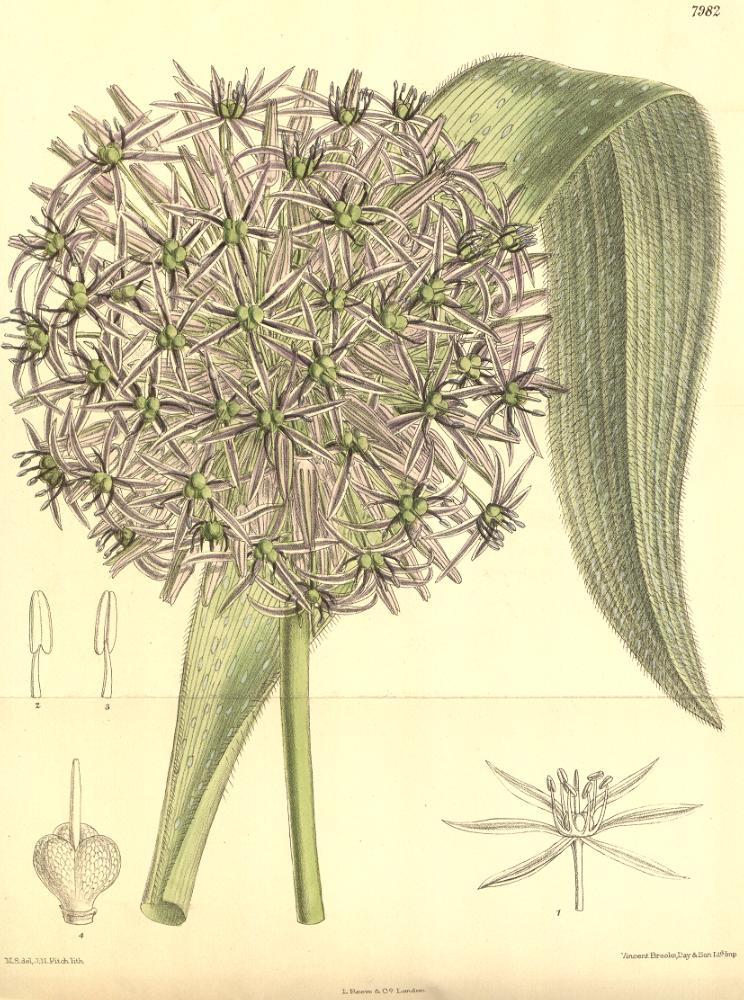
- Allium cristophii

Scientific classification
- Kingdom: Plantae
- Clade: Tracheophytes
- Clade: Angiosperms
- Clade: Monocots
- Order: Asparagales
- Family: Amaryllidaceae
- Subfamily: Allioideae
- Genus: Allium
- Subgenus: Allium subg. Melanocrommyum
- Species: A. cristophii

Binomial name
- Allium cristophii Trautv., conserved name

Synonyms
- Allium christophii Trautv., alternate spelling; Caloscordum cristophii (Trautv.) Banfi & Galasso; Allium albopilosum C.H.Wright; Allium bodeanum Regel; Allium walteri Regel

= Allium cristophii =

Species of flowering plant

Allium cristophii, the Persian onion or star of Persia, is a species of flowering plant in the family Amaryllidaceae, native to Iran, Turkey, and Turkmenistan, though grown as an ornamental bulbous plant in many parts of the world. It may be sold under the synonym of Allium albopilosum.

Star of Persia grows to 50 cm (20 in) and is cultivated in gardens for its large showy umbels of silvery pink star-shaped flowers, 20–25 cm (7.9–9.8 in) in diameter, which appear in early summer. The flowers are followed by attractive fruiting clusters. The plant has received the Royal Horticultural Society's Award of Garden Merit.

A. cristophii performs best in sun to part shade. It is toxic to cats and dogs. It prefers sandy, gritty soil with good drainage, and is best suited to USDA hardiness zones 5–8.

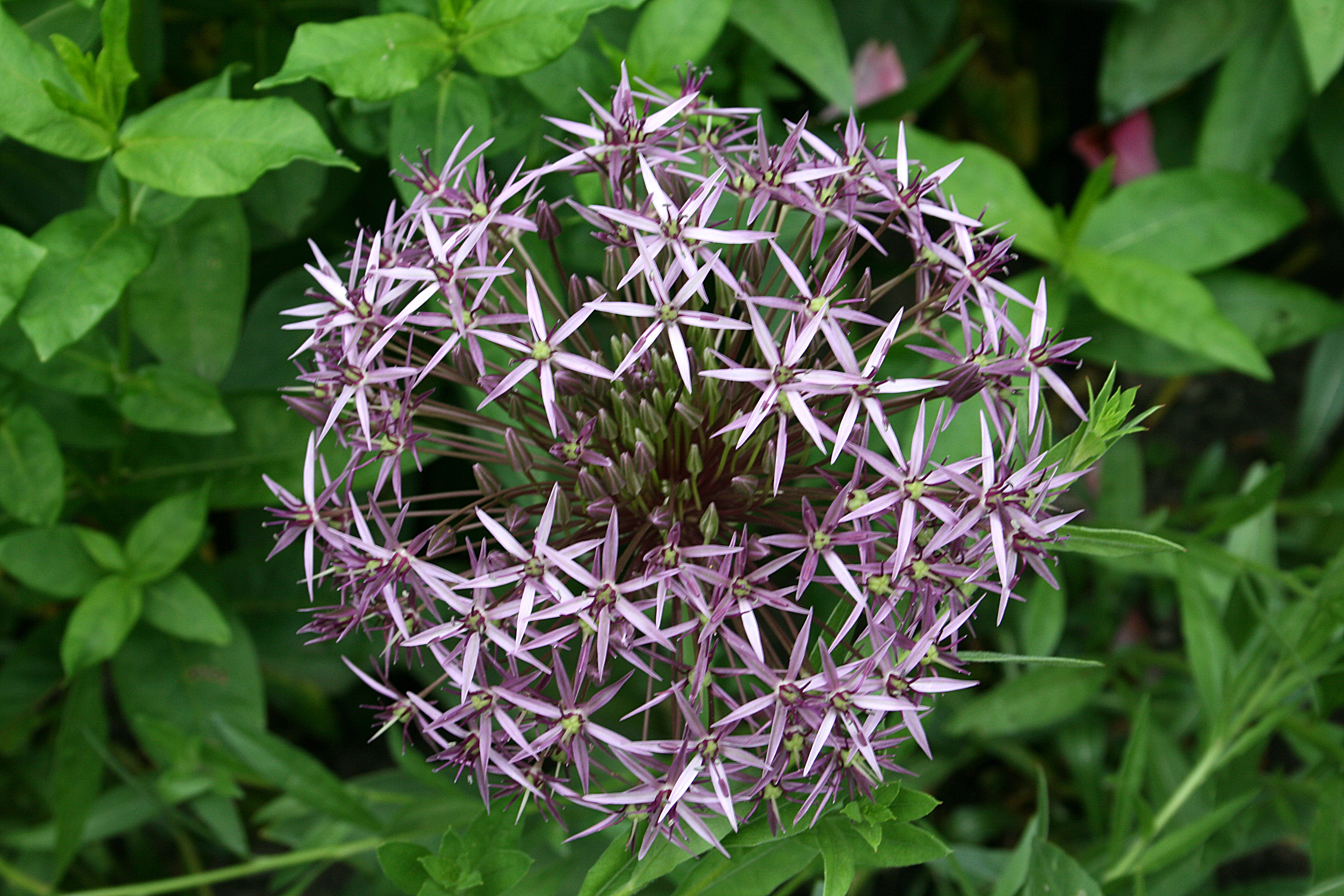
