= Sodium dithionite =

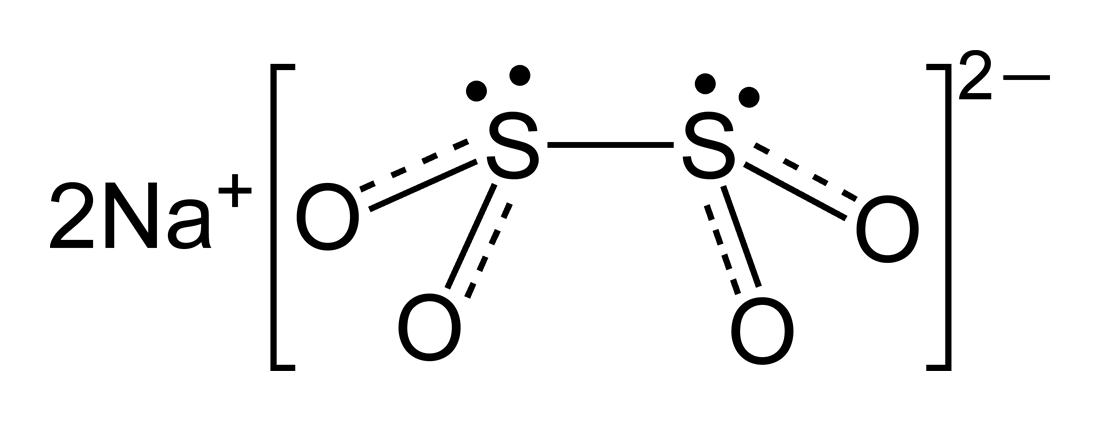
- Sodium dithionite

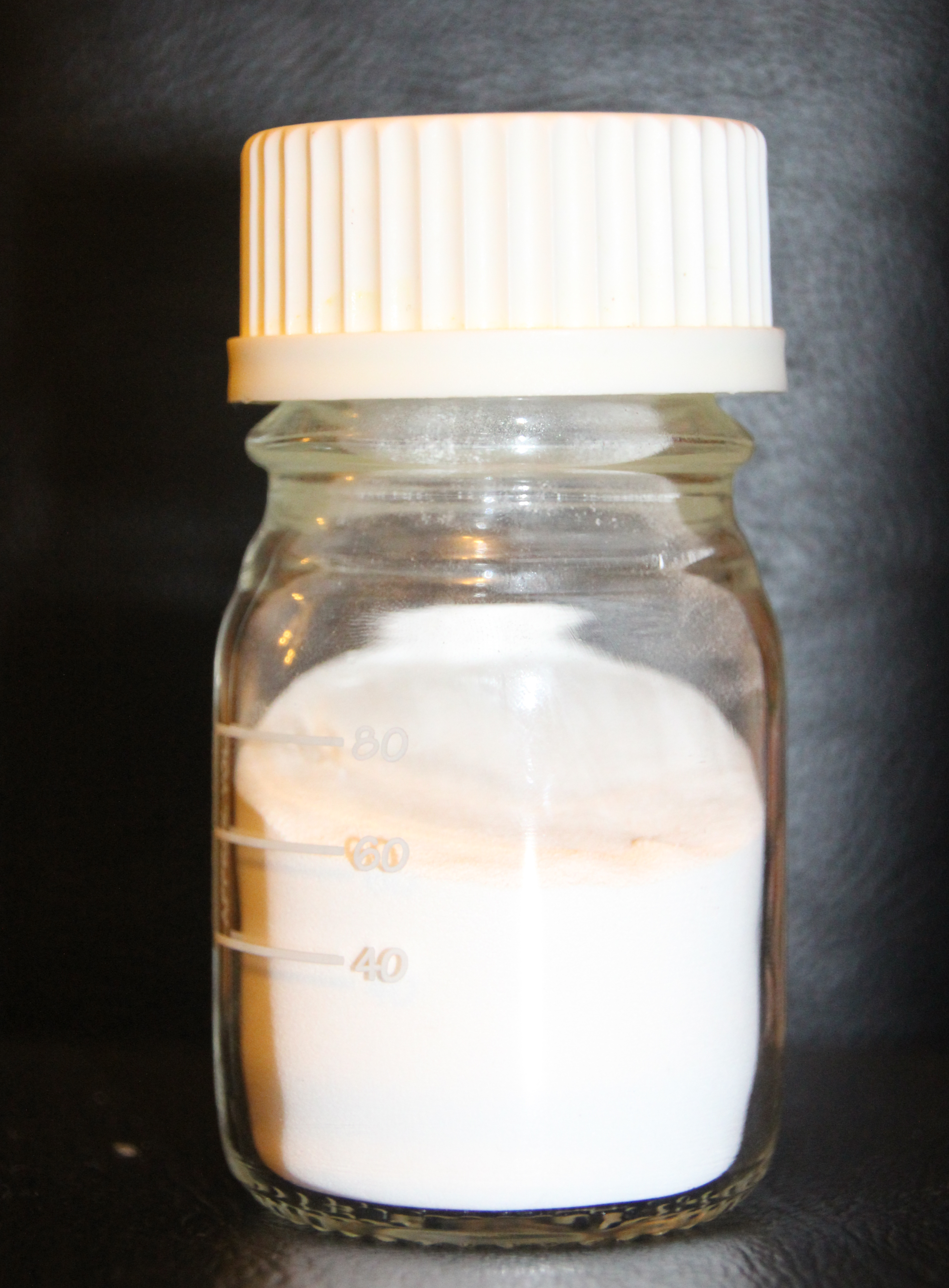

Names
- Other names D-Ox, Hydrolin, Reductone sodium hydrosulfite, sodium sulfoxylate, Sulfoxylate; Vatrolite, Virtex L Hydrosulfit, Prayon; Blankit, Albite A, Konite; Zepar, Burmol, Arostit

Identifiers
CAS Number	7775-14-6
3D model (JSmol)	Interactive image
ChEBI	CHEBI:66870
ChemSpider	22897
ECHA InfoCard	100.028.991
EC Number	231-890-0
PubChem CID	24489
RTECS number	JP2100000
UNII	2K5B8F6ES1
UN number	1384
CompTox Dashboard (EPA)	DTXSID9029697
- InChI: InChI=1S/2Na.H2O4S2/c;;1-5(2)6(3)4/h;;(H,1,2)(H,3,4)/q2*+1;/p-2 Key: JVBXVOWTABLYPX-UHFFFAOYSA-L
- SMILES: [O-]S(=O)S(=O)[O-].[Na+].[Na+]

Properties
Chemical formula	Na_{2}S_{2}O_{4}
Molar mass	174.107 g/mol (anhydrous); 210.146 g/mol (dihydrate)
Appearance	white to grayish crystalline powder light-lemon colored flakes
Odor	faint sulfur odor
Density	2.38 g/cm^{3} (anhydrous); 1.58 g/cm^{3} (dihydrate)
Melting point	52 °C (126 °F; 325 K)
Boiling point	Decomposes
Solubility in water	18.2 g/100 mL (anhydrous, 20 °C); 21.9 g/100 mL (Dihydrate, 20 °C)
Solubility	slightly soluble in alcohol

Hazards
- GHS labelling
Pictograms	(GHS02: Flammable) (GHS07: Exclamation mark)
Signal word	Danger
Hazard statements	H251, H302
Precautionary statements	P235+P410, P264, P270, P280, P301+P312, P330, P407, P413, P420, P501
NFPA 704 (fire diamond)	2 3 1
Flash point	100 °C (212 °F; 373 K)
Autoignition temperature	200 °C (392 °F; 473 K)

Related compounds
Other anions	Sodium sulfite Sodium sulfate
Related compounds	Sodium thiosulfate Sodium bisulfite Sodium metabisulfite Sodium bisulfate
- Except where otherwise noted, data are given for materials in their standard state (at 25 °C [77 °F], 100 kPa). verify (what is ?) Infobox references

Sodium dithionite (also known as sodium hydrosulfite) is a white crystalline powder with a sulfurous odor. Although it is stable in dry air, it decomposes in hot water and in acid solutions.

== Structure ==
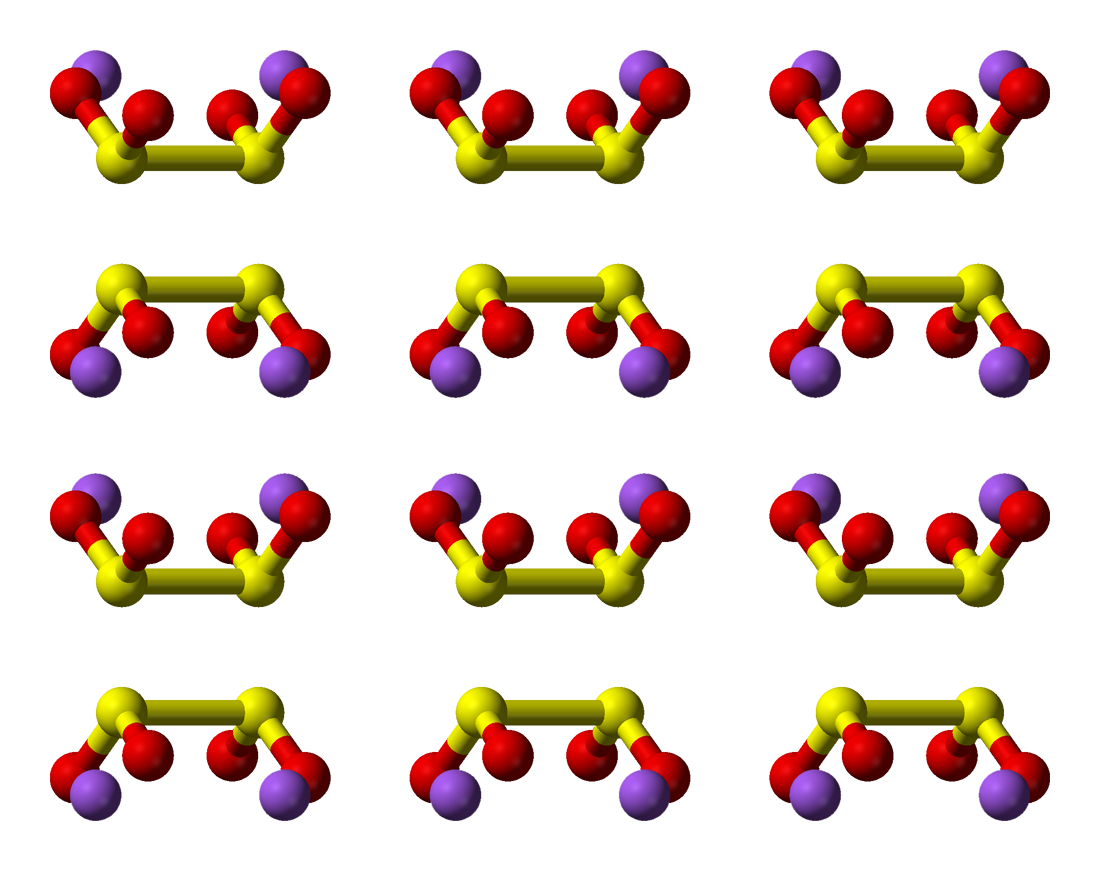
Packing of sodium dithionite ions in a crystal, showing the saw-horse geometry of the dianion. Color code: red = O, yellow = S.

The structure has been examined by Raman spectroscopy and X-ray crystallography. The dithionite dianion has C_{2} symmetry, with almost eclipsed with a 16° O-S-S-O torsional angle. In the dihydrated form (Na_{2}S_{2}O_{4}·2H_{2}O), the dithionite anion has gauche 56° O-S-S-O torsional angle.

A weak S-S bond is indicated by the S-S distance of 239 pm, which is elongated by ca. 30 pm relative to a typical S-S bond. Because this bond is fragile, the dithionite anion dissociates in solution into the [SO_{2}]^{−} radicals, as has been confirmed by EPR spectroscopy. It is also observed that ^{35}S undergoes rapid exchange between S_{2}O_{4}^{2−} and SO_{2} in neutral or acidic solution, consistent with the weak S-S bond in the anion.

== Preparation ==
Sodium dithionite is produced industrially by reduction of sulfur dioxide. Approximately 300,000 tons were produced in 1990. The route using zinc powder is a two-step process:

2 SO_{2} + Zn → ZnS_{2}O_{4}
ZnS_{2}O_{4} + 2 NaOH → Na_{2}S_{2}O_{4} + Zn(OH)_{2}

The sodium borohydride method obeys the following stoichiometry:

NaBH_{4} + 8 NaOH + 8 SO_{2} → 4 Na_{2}S_{2}O_{4} + NaBO_{2} + 6 H_{2}O

Each equivalent of H^{−} reduces two equivalents of sulfur dioxide. Formate has also been used as the reductant.

== Properties and reactions ==
=== Hydrolysis ===
Sodium dithionite is stable when dry, but aqueous solutions deteriorate due to the following reaction:

2 S_{2}O_{4}^{2−} + H_{2}O → S_{2}O_{3}^{2−} + 2 HSO_{3}^{−}

This behavior is consistent with the instability of dithionous acid. Thus, solutions of sodium dithionite cannot be stored for a long period of time.

Anhydrous sodium dithionite decomposes to sodium sulfate and sulfur dioxide above 90 °C in the air. In absence of air, it decomposes quickly above 150 °C to sodium sulfite, sodium thiosulfate, sulfur dioxide and trace amount of sulfur.

=== Redox reactions ===
Sodium dithionite is a reducing agent. At pH 7, the potential is -0.66 V compared to the normal hydrogen electrode. Redox occurs with formation of bisulfite:

S_{2}O_{4}^{2-} + 2 H_{2}O → 2 HSO_{3}^{−} + 2 e^{−} + 2 H^{+}

Sodium dithionite reacts with oxygen:

Na_{2}S_{2}O_{4} + O_{2} + H_{2}O → NaHSO_{4} + NaHSO_{3}

These reactions exhibit complex pH-dependent equilibria involving bisulfite, thiosulfate, and sulfur dioxide.

=== With organic carbonyls ===
In the presence of aldehydes, sodium dithionite reacts either to form α-hydroxy-sulfinates at room temperature or to reduce the aldehyde to the corresponding alcohol above a temperature of 85 °C. Some ketones are also reduced under similar conditions.

== Uses ==
=== Industry ===
Sodium dithionite is used as a water-soluble reducing agent in some industrial dyeing processes. In the case of sulfur dyes and vat dyes, an otherwise water-insoluble dye can be reduced into its water-soluble alkali metal leuco salt. Indigo dye is sometimes processed in this way.

=== Domestic and hobby uses ===
Sodium dithionite can also be used for water treatment, aquarium water conditioners, gas purification, cleaning, and stripping. In addition to the textile industry, this compound is used in industries concerned with leather, foods, polymers, photography, and many others, often as a decolourising agent. It is even used domestically as a decolouring agent for white laundry, when it has been accidentally stained by way of a dyed item slipping into the high temperature washing cycle. It is usually available in 5 gram sachets termed hydrosulphite after the antiquated name of the salt.

It is the active ingredient in "Iron Out Rust Stain Remover", a commercial rust product.

=== Laboratory ===
Sodium dithionite is often used in physiology experiments as a means of lowering solutions' redox potential (E^{o'} -0.66 V vs SHE at pH 7). Potassium ferricyanide is usually used as an oxidizing chemical in such experiments (E^{o'} ~ .436 V at pH 7). In addition, sodium dithionite is often used in soil chemistry experiments to determine the amount of iron that is not incorporated in primary silicate minerals. Hence, iron extracted by sodium dithionite is also referred to as "free iron."

Aqueous solutions of sodium dithionite were once used to produce 'Fieser's solution' for the removal of oxygen from a gas stream. Pyrithione can be prepared in a two-step synthesis from 2-bromopyridine by oxidation to the N-oxide with a suitable peracid followed by substitution using sodium dithionite to introduce the thiol functional group.

=== Photography ===
It is used in Kodak fogging developer, FD-70. This is used in the second step in processing black and white positive images, for making slides. It is part of the Kodak Direct Positive Film Developing Outfit.

== Safety ==
The wide use of sodium dithionite is attributable in part to its low toxicity LD_{50} at 2.5 g/kg (rats, oral).

== See also ==
- Dithionite
