= 3-Bromopyridine =

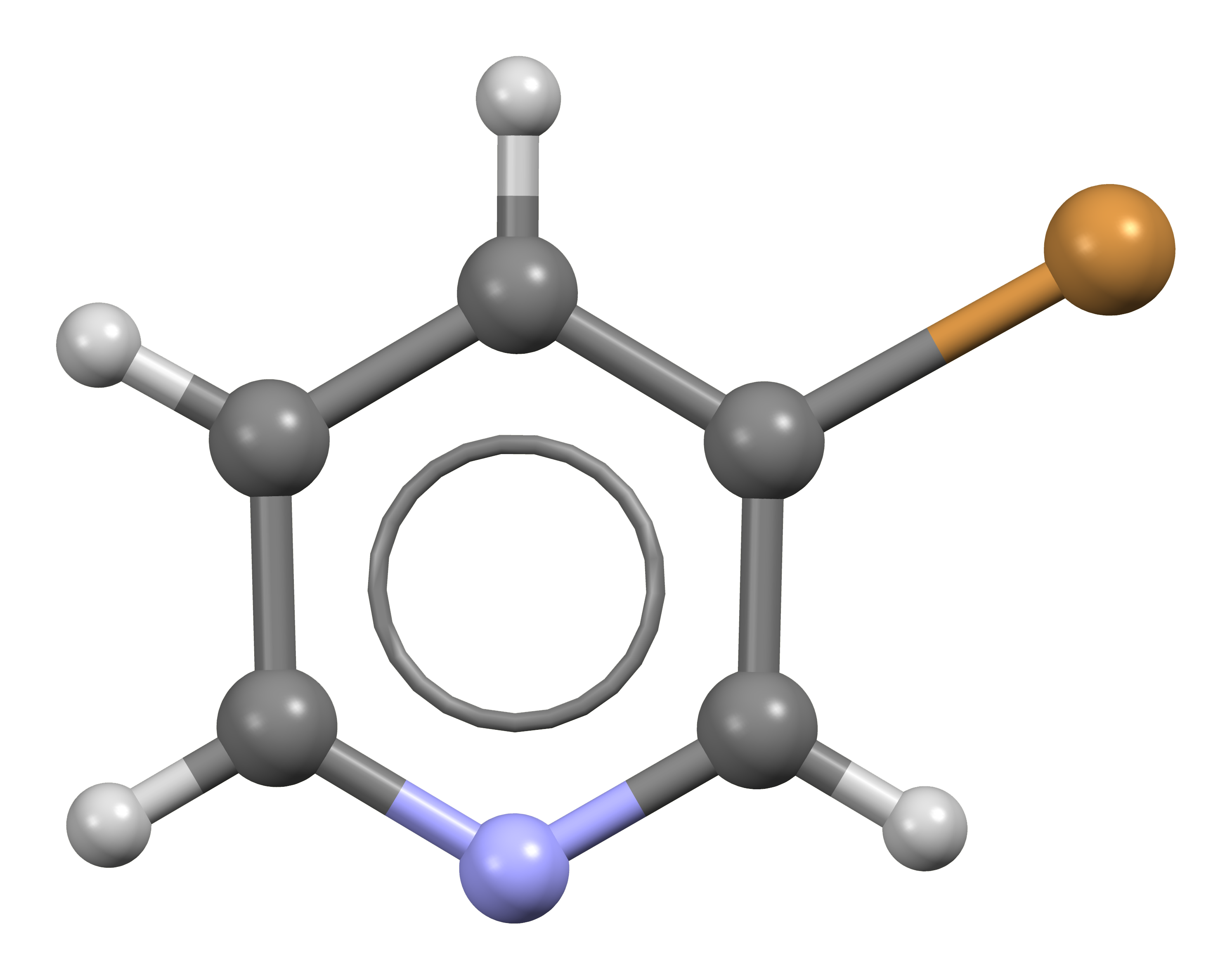

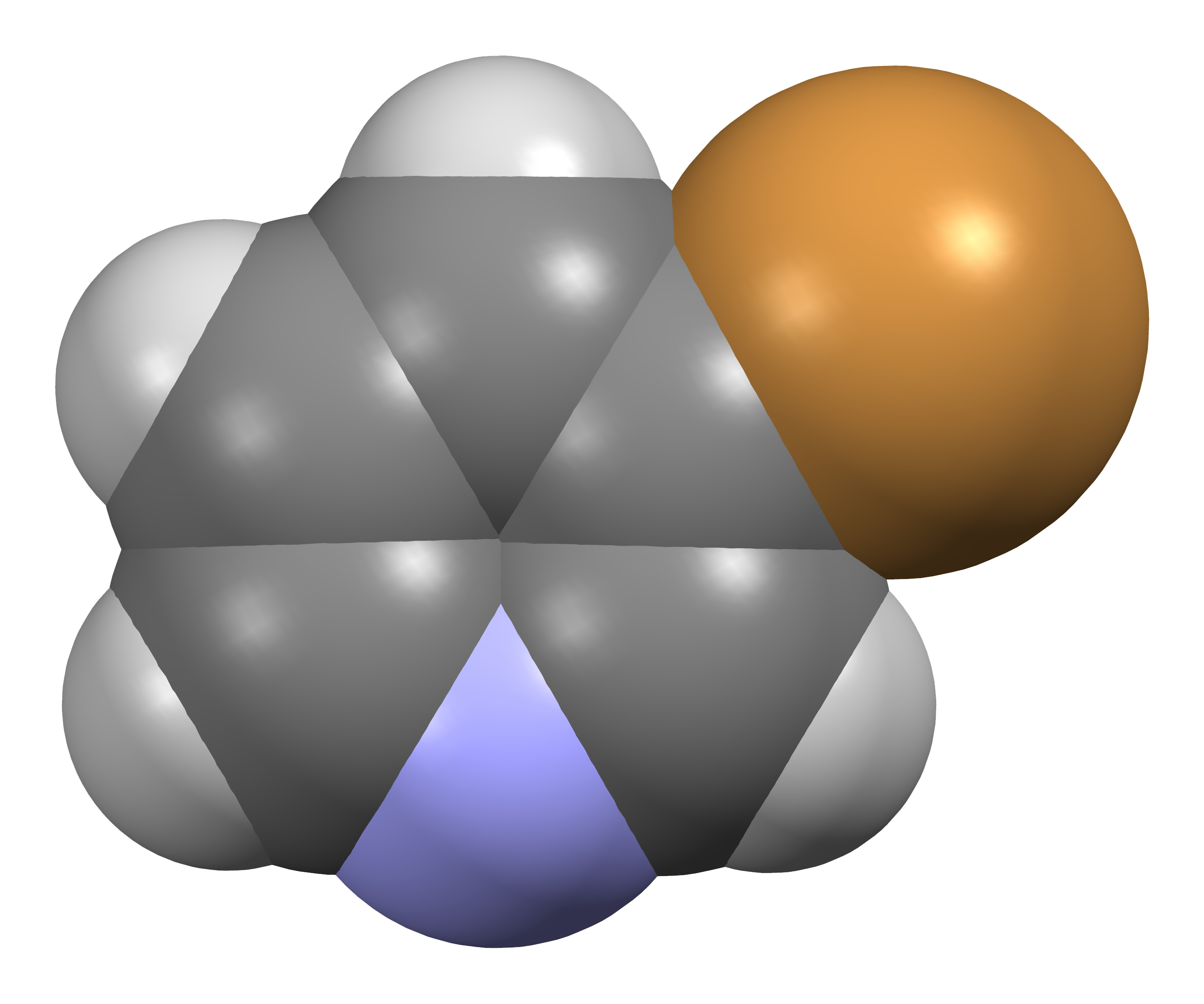

Names
- Preferred IUPAC name 3-Bromopyridine

Identifiers
CAS Number	626-55-1
3D model (JSmol)	Interactive image
Beilstein Reference	105880
ChEBI	CHEBI:51575
ChemSpider	11783
ECHA InfoCard	100.009.957
EC Number	210-952-0
PubChem CID	12286
UNII	XMN8H2XE9H
CompTox Dashboard (EPA)	DTXSID9060819
- InChI: InChI=1S/C5H4BrN/c6-5-2-1-3-7-4-5/h1-4H Key: NYPYPOZNGOXYSU-UHFFFAOYSA-N
- SMILES: C1=CC(=CN=C1)Br

Properties
Chemical formula	C_{5}H_{4}BrN
Molar mass	157.998 g·mol^{−1}
Appearance	colorless liquid
Density	1.640 g/cm^{3}
Melting point	−27 °C (−17 °F; 246 K)
Boiling point	173 °C (343 °F; 446 K)

Hazards
- GHS labelling
Pictograms	(GHS02: Flammable) (GHS06: Toxic) (GHS07: Exclamation mark)
Signal word	Danger
Hazard statements	H226, H301, H302, H311, H315, H319, H332, H335
Precautionary statements	P210, P233, P240, P241, P242, P243, P261, P264, P270, P271, P280, P301+P310, P301+P312, P302+P352, P303+P361+P353, P304+P312, P304+P340, P305+P351+P338, P312, P321, P322, P330, P332+P313, P337+P313, P361, P362, P363, P370+P378, P403+P233, P403+P235, P405, P501
Flash point	51 °C (124 °F; 324 K)

Related compounds
Related compounds	3-Chloropyridine; 2-Bromopyridine
- Except where otherwise noted, data are given for materials in their standard state (at 25 °C [77 °F], 100 kPa). Infobox references

3-Bromopyridine is an aryl bromide and isomer of bromopyridine with the formula C_{5}H_{4}BrN. It is a colorless liquid that is mainly used as a building block in organic synthesis.

It participates as a substrate in many reactions associated with aryl halides, e.g., the Heck reaction and Buchwald–Hartwig amination.

== Applications ==
Known uses of 3-bromopyridine include the synthesis of the following: pirmenol, rivanicline, MTEP, preclamol, metyrapone, biricodar, etc.
