= Bis(2-ethylhexyl) maleate =

Names
- Preferred IUPAC name Bis(2-ethylhexyl) (2Z)-but-2-enedioate
- Other names Bis(2-ethylhexyl) maleate; Di-2-ethylhexyl maleate; Diethylhexyl maleate; DOM

Identifiers
CAS Number	142-16-5
3D model (JSmol)	Interactive image
ChemSpider	4517207
ECHA InfoCard	100.005.022
EC Number	205-524-5
PubChem CID	5365125
UNII	C2F7JHI12L
CompTox Dashboard (EPA)	DTXSID2027094
- InChI: InChI=1S/C20H36O4/c1-5-9-11-17(7-3)15-23-19(21)13-14-20(22)24-16-18(8-4)12-10-6-2/h13-14,17-18H,5-12,15-16H2,1-4H3/b14-13- Key: ROPXFXOUUANXRR-YPKPFQOOSA-N
- SMILES: CCCCC(CC)COC(=O)/C=C\C(=O)OCC(CC)CCCC

Properties
Chemical formula	C_{20}H_{36}O_{4}
Molar mass	340.504 g·mol^{−1}
Appearance	Colorless liquid
Density	0.94 g/cm^{3}
Melting point	−60 °C (−76 °F; 213 K)
Boiling point	156 °C (313 °F; 429 K)
Solubility in water	0.036 mg/L (20 °C)

Hazards
- GHS labelling
Pictograms	(GHS07: Exclamation mark) (GHS08: Health hazard) (GHS09: Environmental hazard)
Signal word	Warning
Hazard statements	H315, H319, H373, H410
Precautionary statements	P260, P264, P273, P280, P302+P352, P305+P351+P338, P314, P321, P332+P313, P337+P313, P362, P391, P501
Flash point	185 °C (365 °F; 458 K)
- Except where otherwise noted, data are given for materials in their standard state (at 25 °C [77 °F], 100 kPa). Infobox references

Bis(2-ethylhexyl) maleate is the chemical compound with the structural formula (H_{3}C(−CH_{2})_{3}−CH(−CH_{2}−CH_{3})−CH_{2}−O−C(=O)−CH=)_{2}, where the two carboxylate groups are mutually cis. It can be described as the double ester of maleic acid with the alcohol 2-ethylhexanol. It is commonly called dioctyl maleate (DOM), reflecting the older usage of "octane" to refer to any 8-carbon alkane, straight-chained or branched.

The compound is manufactured by treating 2-ethylhexanol with maleic anhydride and an esterification catalyst. It is a key intermediate raw material in the production of dioctyl sulfosuccinate (DOSS, docusate) salts, used medically as laxatives and stool softeners, and in many other applications as versatile surfactants.

== See also ==
- Dibutyl maleate
- Diethyl maleate
- Dimethyl maleate
