= Dibutyl maleate =

Maleic acid dibutyl ester
- Chemical structure of maleic acid dibutyl ester

Names
- Preferred IUPAC name Dibutyl (2Z)-but-2-enedioate
- Other names: Maleic acid dibutyl ester; DBM

Identifiers
CAS Number	105-76-0
3D model (JSmol)	Interactive image
ChEMBL	ChEMBL1466826
ChemSpider	4436356
ECHA InfoCard	100.003.027
EC Number	203-328-4
MeSH	maleate dibutyl maleate
PubChem CID	5271569
UNII	4X371TMK9K
CompTox Dashboard (EPA)	DTXSID3026724
- InChI: InChI=1S/C12H20O4/c1-3-5-9-15-11(13)7-8-12(14)16-10-6-4-2/h7-8H,3-6,9-10H2,1-2H3/b8-7- Key: JBSLOWBPDRZSMB-FPLPWBNLSA-N
- SMILES: CCCCOC(=O)/C=C\C(=O)OCCCC

Properties
Chemical formula	C_{12}H_{20}O_{4}
Molar mass	228.288 g·mol^{−1}
Appearance	Colorless to yellowish liquid with a characteristic odor
Density	0.99 g·cm^{−3}
Melting point	−85 °C (−121 °F; 188 K)
Boiling point	280 °C (536 °F; 553 K)
Solubility in water	Very hardly soluble (0.17 g·l^{−1} at 20 °C)
Vapor pressure	0.0027 hPa (20 °C)
Refractive index (n_{D})	1.445 (20 °C)

Hazards
- GHS labelling
Pictograms	(GHS07: Exclamation mark) (GHS08: Health hazard) (GHS09: Environmental hazard)
Hazard statements	H317, H373, H411
Precautionary statements	P273, P280, P302+P352, P314
Flash point	141 °C (286 °F; 414 K)
Autoignition temperature	265 °C (509 °F; 538 K)
Explosive limits	Lower limit: 0.5 vol-%; Upper limit: 3.4 vol-%
- Lethal dose or concentration (LD, LC)
LD_{50} (median dose)	3700 mg·kg^{−1} (rat, oral); 10000 mg·kg^{−1} (rabbit, dermal)
- Except where otherwise noted, data are given for materials in their standard state (at 25 °C [77 °F], 100 kPa). Infobox references

Dibutyl maleate is an organic compound with the formula (CHCO_{2}Bu)_{2} (Bu = butyl). It is the diester of the unsaturated dicarboxylic acid maleic acid. It is a colorless oily liquid, although impure samples can appear yellow.

== Preparation ==
Dibutyl maleate can be prepared by the reaction of maleic acid anhydride and 1-butanol in presence of p-toluenesulfonic acid.

== Uses ==
Dibutyl maleate is mainly used as a plasticizer for aqueous dispersions of copolymers with vinyl acetate and as an intermediate in the preparation of other chemical compounds. With the invention of polyaspartic technology the material found another use. In this situation, an amine is reacted with a dialkyl maleate - usually diethyl maleate but also dibutyl maleate may be used- utilizing the Michael addition reaction. The resulting products, polyaspartic esters products are then used in coatings, adhesives, sealants and elastomers.

== See also ==
- Diethyl maleate
- Dimethyl maleate
