= C12H20O4 =

The molecular formula C_{12}H_{20}O_{4} (molar mass: 228.28 g/mol, exact mass: 228.1362 u) may refer to:

- Maleic acid dibutyl ester
- Octenylsuccinic acid
- Traumatic acid
