= Butendioic acid =

There are two butendioic acids, depending on if they are cis or trans:

- Maleic acid, cis
- Fumaric acid, trans
