= Maleate isomerase =

Member of the Asp/Glu racemase superfamily

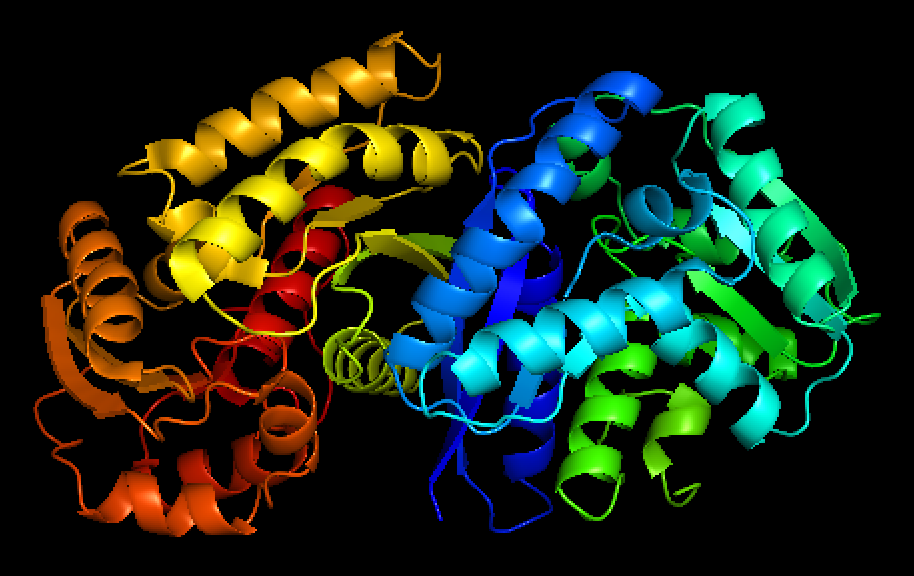
- Representation of maleate isomerase from Pseudomonas putida

Identifiers
- EC no.: 5.2.1.1
- CAS no.: 9023-74-9

Databases
- BRENDA: enzyme data
- ExPASy: NiceZyme view
- KEGG: enzyme entry
- MetaCyc: metabolic pathway
- Rhea: reactions
- PDB structures: RCSB PDB PDBe PDBsum
- Gene Ontology: AmiGO / QuickGO
Search
- PMC: articles
- PubMed: articles
- NCBI: proteins

In enzymology, a maleate isomerase (EC 5.2.1.1), or maleate cis-trans isomerase, is a member of the Asp/Glu racemase superfamily discovered in bacteria. It is responsible for catalyzing cis-trans isomerization of the C2-C3 double bond in maleate to produce fumarate, which is a critical intermediate in citric acid cycle. The presence of an exogenous mercaptan is required for catalysis to happen.

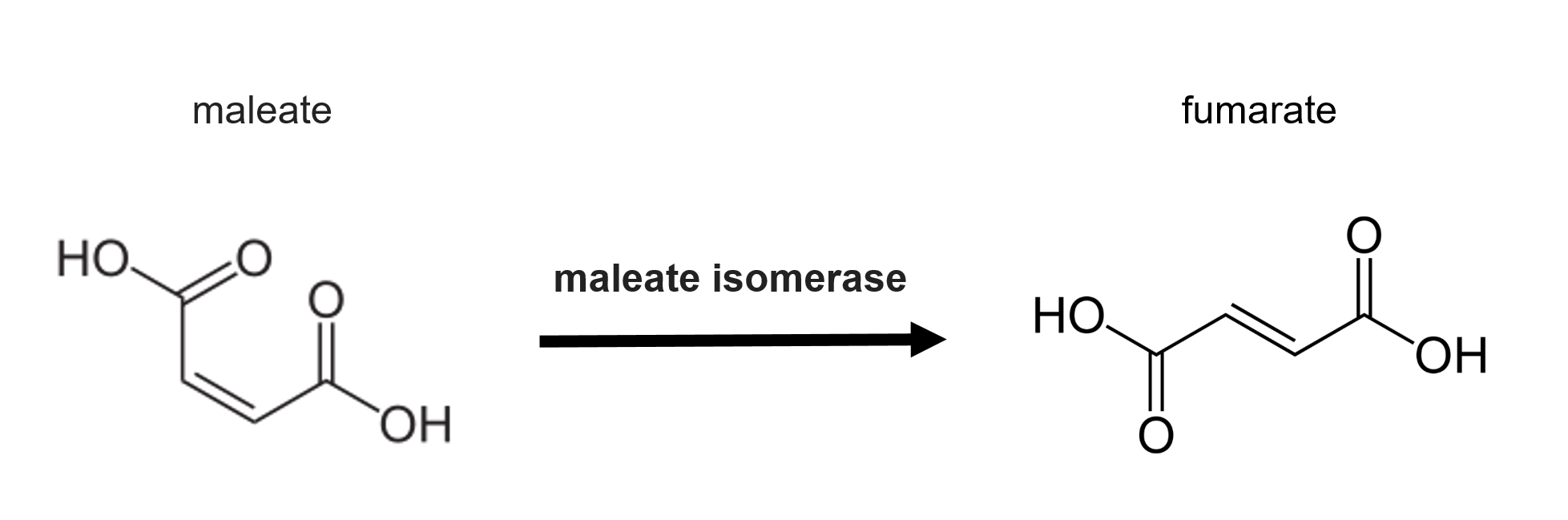
Illustration of the overall isomerization catalyzed by maleate isomerase

Maleate isomerase participates in butanoate metabolism and nicotinate and nicotinamide metabolism. It is an essential enzyme for the last step of metabolic degradation pathway of nicotinic acid. Recently, maleate isomerase has been an industrial target for degradation of tobacco waste. It is also got attention for its involvement in aspartic acid and maleic acid production.

Maleate isomerase has been utilized by multiple bacteria species, including Pseudomonas fluorescens, Alcaligenes faecalis, Bacillus stearothermophilus, Serratia marcescens, Pseudomonas putida and Nocardia farcinica. The enzyme has a molecular weight of 74,000 and a turnover number of 1,800 moles per mole of protein per min.

== Structure ==
Analogous to other Asp/Glu racemase members, maleate isomerase is formed by two identical protomers, with a flat dimerization surface. Each protomer of maleate isomerase has two domains connected by a pseudo-twofold symmetry, with each domain contributes one catalytic cysteine, which is crucial to the isomerase activity at the active site. Experiment shows that substitution of either cysteine by serine significantly reduces the rate of reaction of the enzyme.

In addition to catalytic cysteines, a few other residues at the active site are important for the recognition of the substrate and help stabilize reaction intermediates. For example, maleate isomerase from Pseudomonas putida S16 uses Asn17 and Asn169 form hydrogen bonds with the carboxylate group of the maleate distal to Cys82. Tyr139 hydrogen bonds with the carboxylate group of the maleate proximal to Cys82. Pro14 and Val84 make van der Waals interactions with the C2 and C3 carbon atoms of the maleate.

== Mechanism ==
The mechanism of maleate isomerase is considered to be similar to other Asp/Glu racemase members, though have not been fully understood. One proposed reaction mechanism of Nocardia farcinia maleate isomerase is as follows. At the active site of maleate isomerase, Cys76 is first deprotonated to be more readily act as a nucleophile. The sulfur atom of the deprotonated Cys76 then carries a direct nucleophilic attack to the C2 atom of the maleate, covalently bonding to the C2 atom. Concomitantly, thiol proton of Cys194 is transferred onto the C3 atom of the maleate to form a succinyl-cysteine intermediate. The newly formed C2–C3 single bond is then rotated, with Cys76S–C2 bond dissociated, and C3 atom of the maleate deprotonated by Cys194, thus forming fumarate with regeneration of a neutral Cys194. In certain type of bacteria, maleate seems completely buried inside the cavity of maleate isomerase and cannot be seen on the surface of the enzyme.

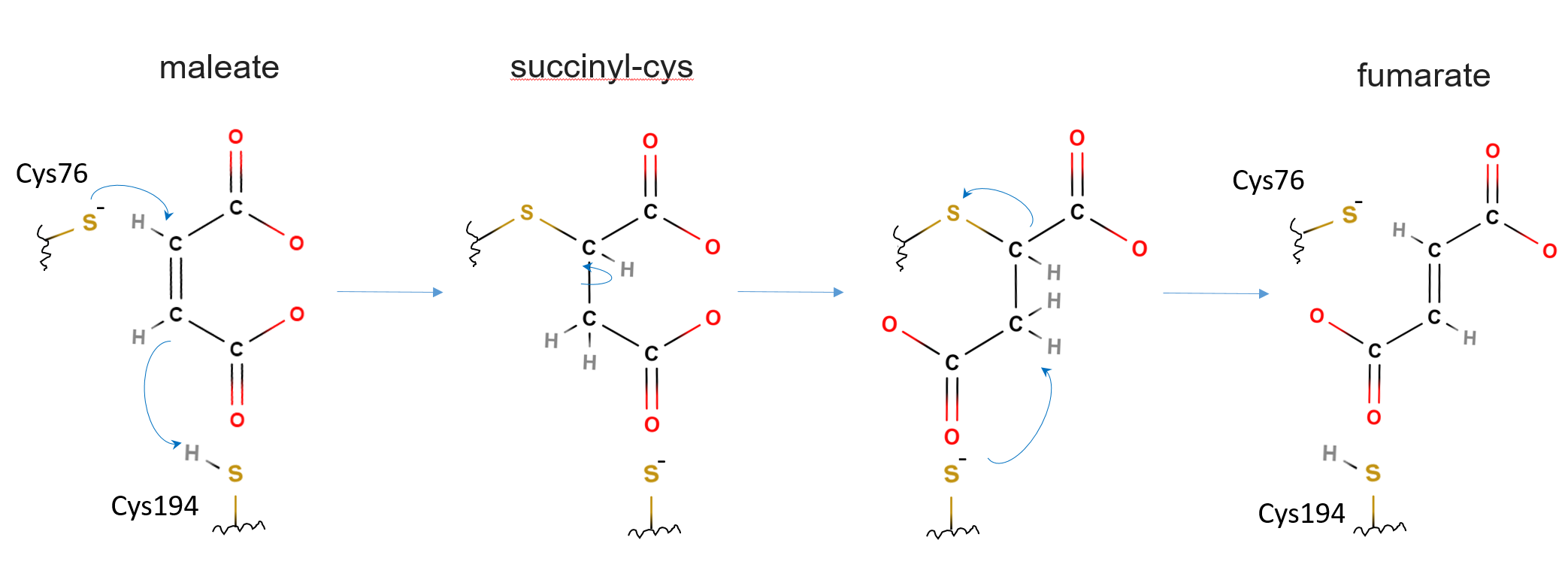
One proposed reaction mechanism of maleate isomerase (C1, C2, C3, C4 are the four carbon atoms in maleate from top to bottom)

== Industrial relevance ==
Maleate isomerase can be used to produce fumaric acid, an important building block material for polymerization and esterification reactions, from the isomerization of maleic acid. Maleic acid is produced from maleic anhydride.

Maleic acid can also be converted into fumaric acid by thermal or catalytic cis–trans isomerization. However, these conversion methods are occurring at high temperatures that causes formation of by-products from maleic and fumaric acids, as a result, yields are below the equilibrium yields. This problem was the main motivation for the alternative enzymatic strategy with maleate isomerase that would facilitate isomerization without by-products.

It is known that, even at moderate temperatures, natural maleate isomerase is unstable. For that reason, heat-stable maleate isomerases are engineered and applied. For example, thermo-stable maleate isomerases derived from Bacillus stearothermophilus, Bacillus brevis, and Bacillus sporothermodurans were used to improve the process. In a study using Pseudomonas alcaligenes XD-1, conversion rate from maleic acid into fumaric acid could be achieved as high as 95%.
