= Diethyl maleate =

Chemical compound

Names
- Preferred IUPAC name Diethyl (2Z)-but-2-enedioate

Identifiers
CAS Number	141-05-9
3D model (JSmol)	Interactive image
ChEBI	CHEBI:68508
ChemSpider	4436353
ECHA InfoCard	100.004.957
EC Number	205-451-9
PubChem CID	5271566
UNII	G81WQB56OL
CompTox Dashboard (EPA)	DTXSID8020464
- InChI: InChI=1S/C8H12O4/c1-3-11-7(9)5-6-8(10)12-4-2/h5-6H,3-4H2,1-2H3/b6-5- Key: IEPRKVQEAMIZSS-WAYWQWQTSA-N
- SMILES: CCOC(=O)/C=C\C(=O)OCC

Properties
Chemical formula	C_{8}H_{12}O_{4}
Molar mass	172.180 g·mol^{−1}

Hazards
- GHS labelling
Pictograms	(GHS07: Exclamation mark)
Signal word	Warning
Hazard statements	H317, H319, H412
Precautionary statements	P261, P264, P272, P273, P280, P302+P352, P305+P351+P338, P321, P333+P313, P337+P313, P363, P501
- Except where otherwise noted, data are given for materials in their standard state (at 25 °C [77 °F], 100 kPa). Infobox references

Diethyl maleate is an organic compound with the CAS Registry number 141-05-9. It is chemically a maleate ester with the formula C_{8}H_{12}O_{4}. It is a colorless liquid at room temperature. It has the IUPAC name of diethyl (Z)-but-2-enedioate.

== Synthesis ==
The material is synthesized by the esterification of maleic acid or maleic anhydride and ethanol.

== Uses ==
One of the key uses for the compound is in production of the pesticide Malathion. It has also been used medically as a chemical depletory of glutathione. It has been studied extensively with regard to renal function. Other medical uses include treatment of breast cancer and its monitoring with Positron Emission Tomography. It is also used as a food additive and has Food and Drug Administration clearance for indirect food contact.

In synthetic organic chemistry it is a dienophile and used in the Diels-Alder reaction.

With the invention of polyaspartic technology the material also found another use. With this technology an amine is reacted with a dialkyl maleate - usually diethyl maleate - utilizing the Michael addition reaction. These products are then used in coatings, adhesives, sealants and elastomers.

== See also ==
- Dimethyl maleate
- Dibutyl maleate
