= Sodium sulfosuccinate esters =

Organic chemical compounds

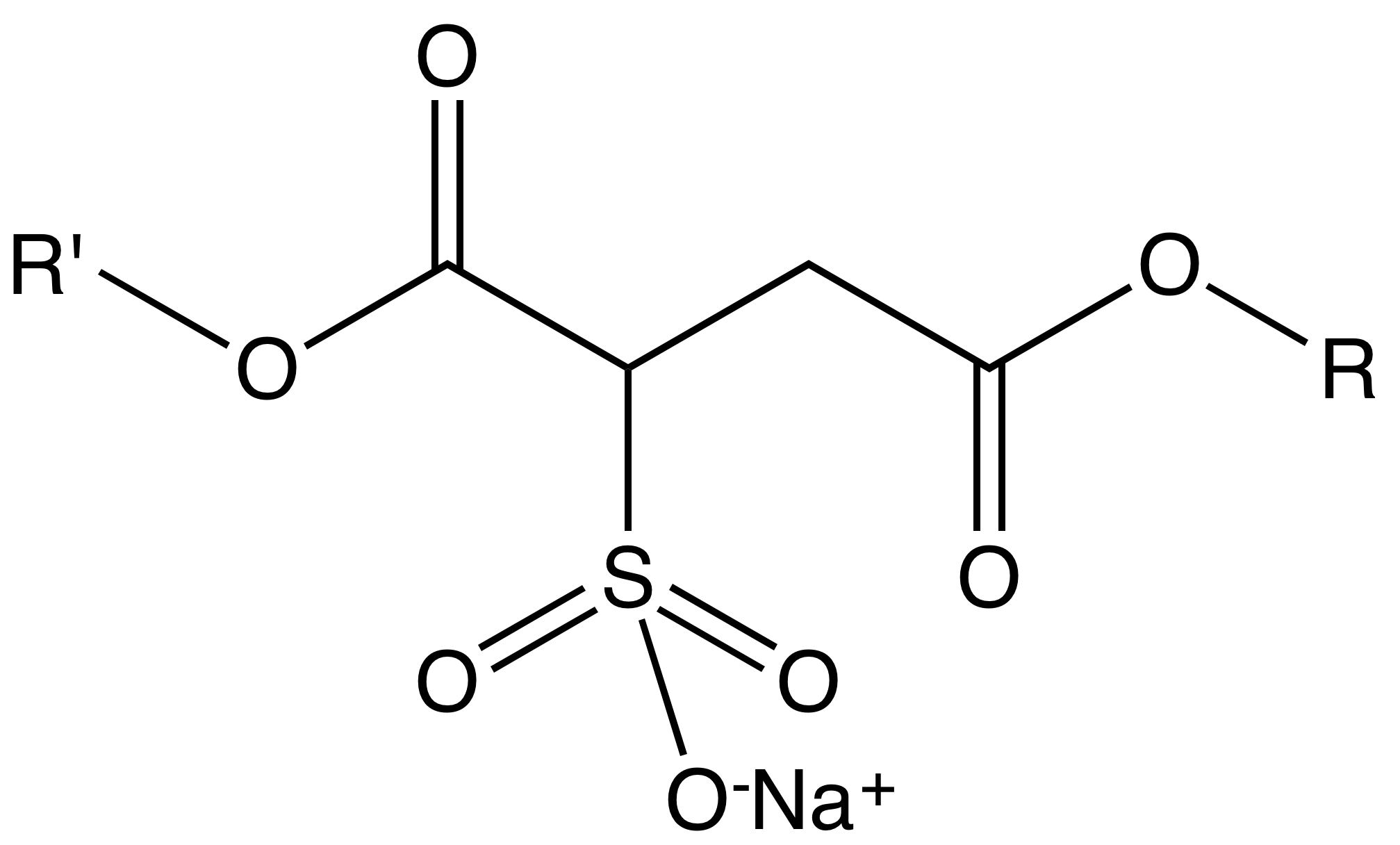
Structure of sodium sulfosuccinate esters.

Sodium sulfosuccinate esters are organic compounds with the formula NaO_{3}SCH(CO_{2}R')CH_{2}CO_{2}R where R and R' can be H or alkyl groups. They comprise a large class of surfactants and emulsifiers used in cosmetics, pharmaceuticals, and cleaning agents. They are colorless salts. These materials can be further classified into monoesters (R' = H, R = alkyl) and diesters (R and R' = alkyl).

== Synthesis ==
They are produced by treatment of maleic anhydride with alcohols. The resulting mono or diesters are then treated with sodium sulfite, which, concomitant with protonation, adds to the C=C bond.

== Application ==
A high volume example is sodium bis(2-ethylhexyl) sulfosuccinate. This is perhaps best known as the laxative docusate, however its main use is as a surfactant for which it finds common use in personal-care and household-care products, often under the name Aerosol-OTs. It is unusual in that it is able to form microemulsions without the use of co-surfactants, and it has a rich variety of aqueous-phase behavior including multiple liquid crystalline phases.
