= Polyurea =

Class of elastomers

Polyurea is a type of elastomer that is derived from the reaction product of an isocyanate component and an amine component. The isocyanate can be aromatic or aliphatic in nature. It can be monomer, polymer, or any variant reaction of isocyanates, quasi-prepolymer or a prepolymer. The prepolymer, or quasi-prepolymer, can be made of an amine-terminated polymer resin, or a hydroxyl-terminated polymer resin.

The resin blend may be made up of amine-terminated polymer resins, and/or amine-terminated chain extenders. The amine-terminated polymer resins do not have any intentional hydroxyl moieties. Any hydroxyls are the result of incomplete conversion to the amine-terminated polymer resins. The resin blend may also contain additives or non-primary components. These additives may contain hydroxyls, such as pre-dispersed pigments in a polyol carrier. Normally, the resin blend does not contain a catalyst(s). This is because the reaction between an isocyanate and amine is extremely fast and hence does not need catalysis.

== Polymer structure ==
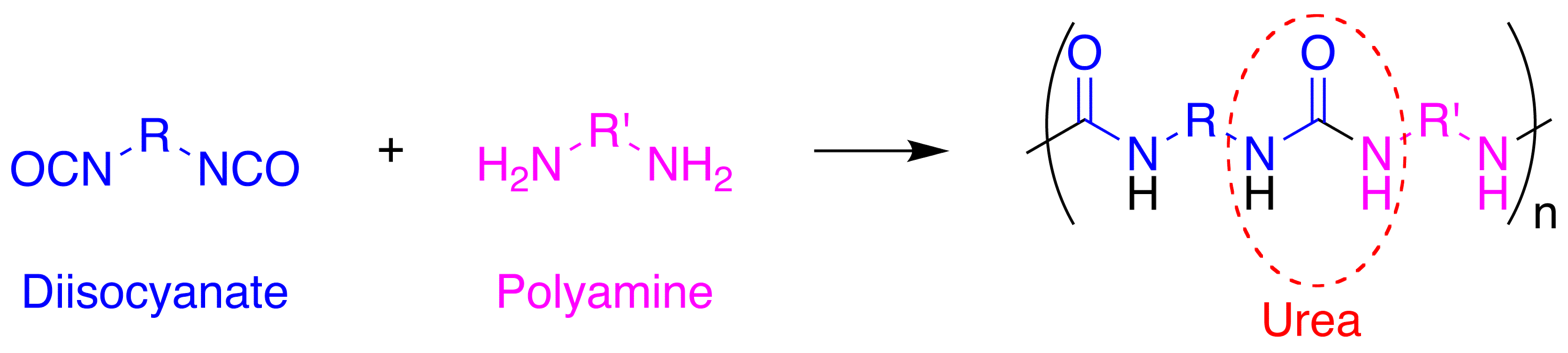
General reaction for forming a polyurea chain, illustrating the two monomer reactants and highlighting the urea linkage in the product

The word polyurea is derived from the Greek words πολυ- - poly- meaning "many"; and ουρίας - oûron meaning "to urinate" (referring to the substance urea, found in urine). Urea, also known as carbamide, is an organic compound with the chemical formula (NH_{2})_{2}CO. The molecule has two amine groups (–NH_{2}) joined by a carbonyl functional group (C=O). In a polyurea, alternating monomer units of isocyanates and amines react with each other to form urea linkages. Ureas can also be formed from the reaction of isocyanates and water which forms a carbamic acid intermediate. This acid quickly decomposes by splitting off carbon dioxide and leaving behind an amine. This amine then reacts with another isocyanate group to form the polyurea linkage. This two step reaction is used to make what is commonly but improperly called polyurethane foam. The carbon dioxide that is liberated in this reaction is the primary blowing (foaming) agent especially in many polyurethane foams which more precisely should be called polyurethane/urea foams.

== Uses ==
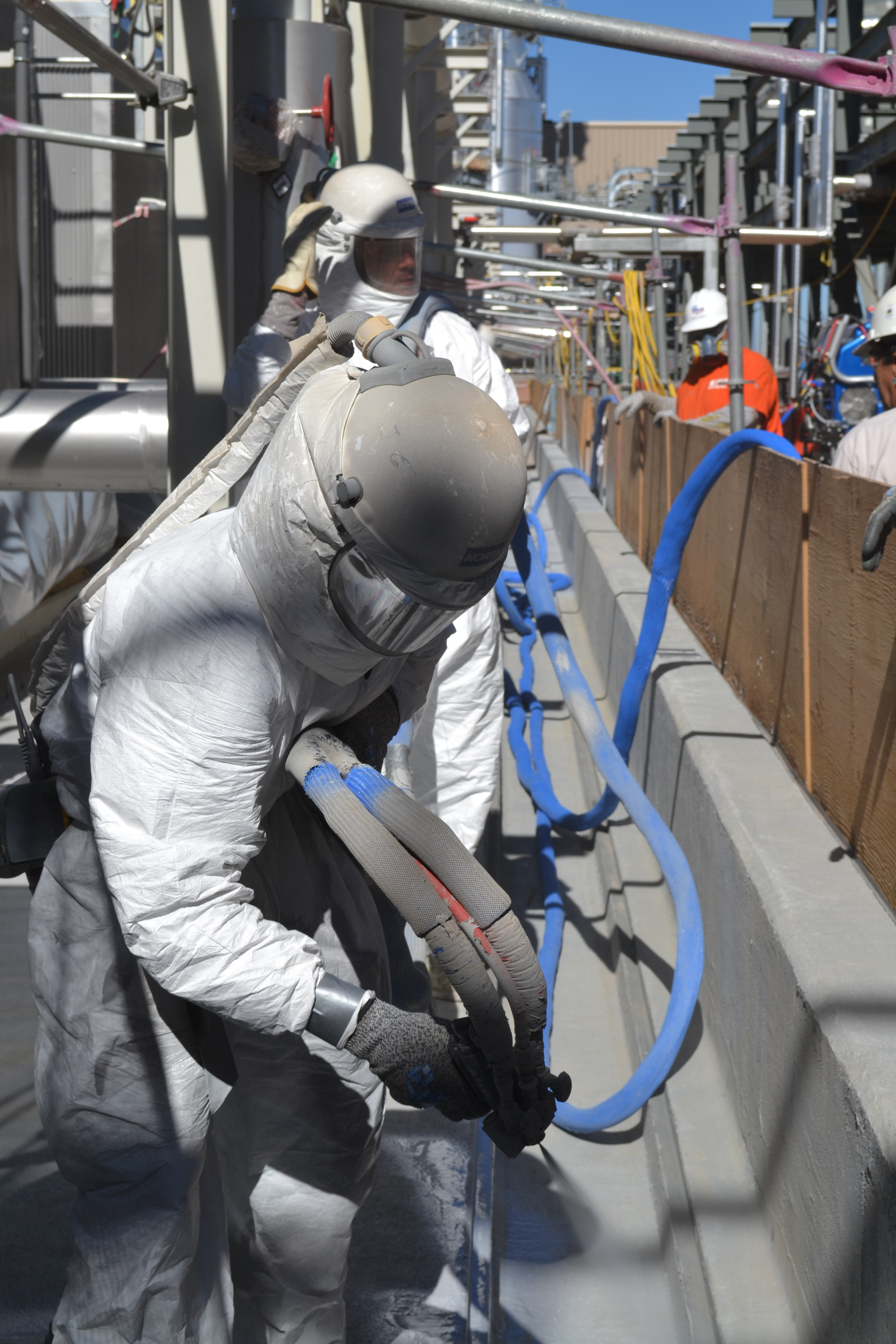
Application of a polyurea coating on the floor at the Pueblo Chemical Agent-Destruction Pilot Plant, Colorado, United States, as secondary containment.

Polyurea and polyurethane are copolymers used in the manufacture of spandex, which was invented in 1959.

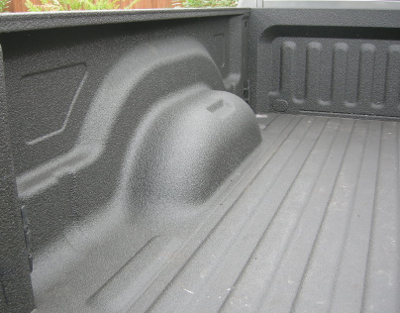
A pickup bed lined with sprayed polyurethane polyurea.

Polyurea was originally developed in automotive applications in the 1980s but other applications such as protecting tabletop edges followed. Its fast reactivity and relative moisture insensitivity made it useful for coatings on large surface area projects, such as secondary containment, manhole and tunnel coatings, tank liners, and truck bed liners. Excellent adhesion to concrete and steel is obtained with the proper primer and surface treatment. They can also be used for spray molding and armor. Some polyureas reach strengths of 40 MPa (6000 psi) tensile and over 500% elongation making it a tough coating. The quick cure time allows many coats to be built up quickly. The high strength, impact and abrasion resistance of polyurea coatings is a key reason for their use.

In 2014, a polyurea elastomer-based material was shown to be self-healing, melding together after being cut in half. The material also includes inexpensive commercially available compounds. The elastomer molecules were tweaked, making the bonds between them longer. The resulting molecules are easier to pull apart from one another and better able to rebond at room temperature with almost the same strength. The rebonding can be repeated. Elastic, self-healing paints and other coatings recently took a step closer to common use, thanks to research being conducted at the University of Illinois. Scientists there have used "off-the-shelf" components to create a polymer that melds back together after being cut in half, without the addition of other chemicals.

Polyurea has become a preferred long term solution for narrowboats. The traditional coating with bitumen, known as "blacking" is being replaced with the practice of using polyurea coatings. The clearest advantage is that it is not necessary to reapply a coat every 3–4 years. It is thought that polyurea coatings last 25–30 years.

Commercial trademarks for Polyurea include Line-X, GLS 100R, and Pentens SPU-1000, to name a few. There are multiple possible polyurea formulations. The Polyurea Development Association is a trade association that represents the interests of polyurea coating manufacturers.

== See also ==
- Polyaspartic esters – Class of polymers
