= 2,3-Dimethylmaleic anhydride =

Names
- Preferred IUPAC name 2,3-Dimethylfuran-2,5-dione
- Other names DMMA

Identifiers
CAS Number	766-39-2
3D model (JSmol)	Interactive image
ChEBI	CHEBI:182178
ChEMBL	ChEMBL2270559
ChemSpider	12469
ECHA InfoCard	100.011.059
EC Number	212-165-8
PubChem CID	13010
UNII	6PP3N541QA
CompTox Dashboard (EPA)	DTXSID6061103
- InChI: InChI=1S/C6H6O3/c1-3-4(2)6(8)9-5(3)7/h1-2H3 Key: MFGALGYVFGDXIX-UHFFFAOYSA-N
- SMILES: CC1=C(C(=O)OC1=O)C

Properties
Chemical formula	C_{6}H_{6}O_{3}
Molar mass	126.111 g·mol^{−1}
Appearance	Colorless solid
Density	1.107 g/cm^{3}
Melting point	96 °C (205 °F; 369 K)
- Except where otherwise noted, data are given for materials in their standard state (at 25 °C [77 °F], 100 kPa). Infobox references

2,3-Dimethylmaleic anhydride is an organic compound with the formula (CH_{3})_{2}C_{2}(CO)_{2}O. It is related to maleic anhydride (MA) by replacement of the two CH units with CCH_{3} groups. It is the anhydride of 2,3-dimethylmaleic acid.

== Synthesis ==
The compound can be prepared from two equivalents of MA in the presence of various amines, such as 2-aminopyridine, followed by treatment with sulfuric acid. It has been evaluated as a comonomer. It occurs in some plants such as Colocasia esculenta.

Chemical structure of an intermediate in the 2-aminopyridine-catalyzed conversion of maleic anhydride to dimethylmaleic anhydride.
