= Truck bedliner =

Liner applied to protect a truck bed

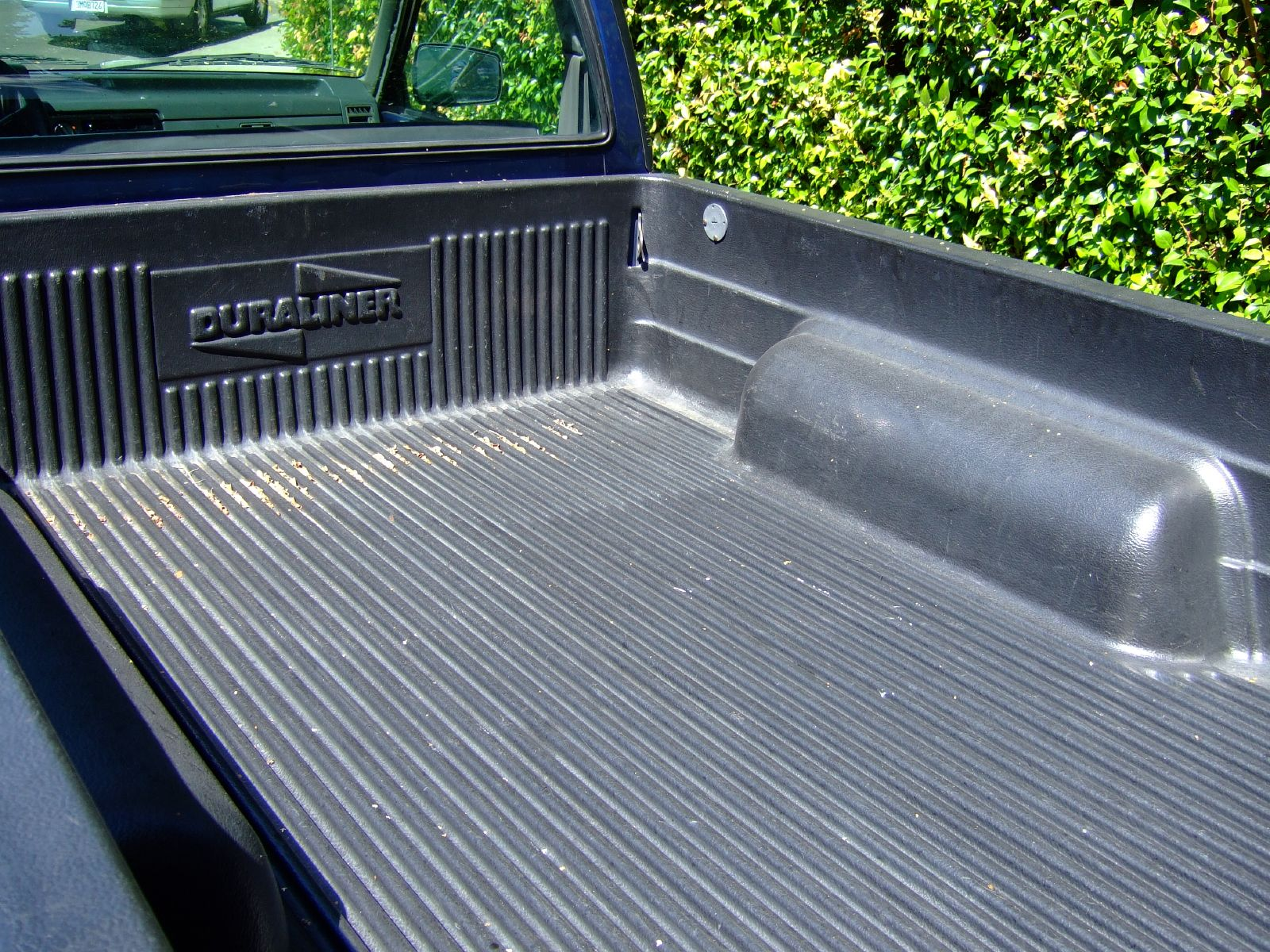
A Drop In brand bed liner, when inserted inside the truck

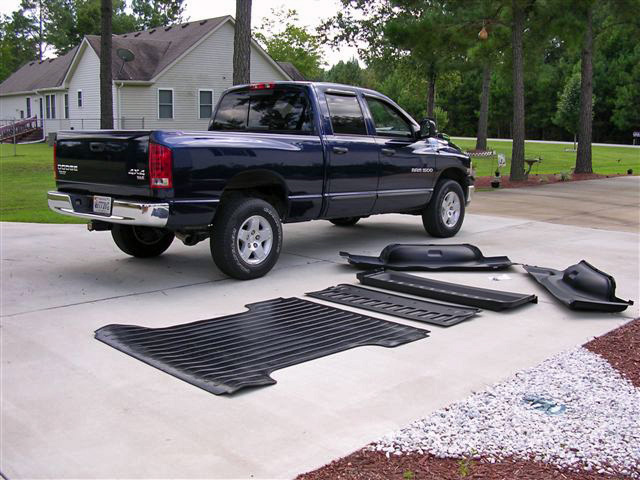
A Dual Liner bed liner was taken out.

A truck bed liner, or simply a bed liner, is a protector applied or installed into a truck. It can be used to protect the bed of the truck from impact damage and abrasive damage. There are two broad classifications of bed liners: "Drop-in" and "Spray-on/in". "Drop-in" bed liners are installed into a truck bed with limited preparation work and are removable for cleaning. Spray-in bed liners require specific preparation to allow the coating to adhere correctly into the truck bed. How well the coating adheres will determine how long it will last.

== History ==
Protecting the bed of trucks has been around since the inception of the modern pick-up truck in the early 1950s with simple modifications being made such as installing planks of wood to the beds. The Ford F100 featured such options, now done only for cosmetic purposes or restoration. Many owners install a simple sheet of wood as a means to protect the floor from being scratched or dented.

As pickup trucks were designed to haul cargo, a more advanced method was created. Thermoforming, a technique that has been around since the 1940s in acrylics and styrene, would eventually through advances in development and research create the first plastic drop-in bed liner. In 1972, G. Fred Lorenzen filed a patent for a "protective inner liner of a cargo box or body of pickup truck". In 1976, Robert J. Zeffero filed a patent regarding the protection of truck beds with a "cargo box liner for pick-up trucks". In 1983, Penda Corporation along with others would soon figure out a way to replicate the design and start to manufacture their own design of a bed liner.Since the beginning of the 21st century, environmental safety has become paramount, leading to the selection of linings made from environmentally friendly materials such as thermoplastic elastomers (TPEs), which are recyclable and non-toxic.

== Drop-in bed liners ==
Drop-in or plastic bed liners are the most commonly found type, although with the spray-on bed liner industry garnered recognition, drop-ins have lost some value in market share. Drop-ins can usually be installed rather quickly with no major modification made to the bed of the truck except by drilling small holes in key areas to hold it in place in certain applications. Typically made of a polyethylene composite, drop-ins are rigid structures formed to the contours of a specific vehicle model. A newer version of a drop-in bed liner, recently introduced, is composed of separate sides and a rubber mat for the floor made by Dual Liner.

== Spray-on bed liners ==
"Sprayed-on"/"Sprayed-in"/"Spray-on"/"Spray-in" (these terms are used interchangeably in the industry) come in varying formulations and process methods such as high or low pressure, aromatic or aliphatic, polyurea or polyurethane, or hybrid and solvent base.

Spray-in bed liners were pioneered in South Africa in 1983 when Morgan Evans became the first person to successfully apply spray-on polyurethane to the load bed of pick up trucks.

Performance greatly relies on the initial surface preparation done on the bed. It is possible to have the color of the bed liner match that of the vehicle, but with time the color fades from ultraviolet radiation is inevitable.

Aromatic is generally used for black and darker colors and is the least expensive option.

Aliphatic can be a better option for colors because its color is more stable over time in ultraviolet light. It is produced with pure polyurethane, which drives up the cost by approximately 35%. Aliphatic materials can be sprayed in a wide variety of colors, including metallic finishes.

Spray-on bed liners can be applied by roller, low-pressure, cartridge driven by an air compressor, or high-pressure machine.

Environmental conditions such as humidity, temperature, wind, and elevation can affect the curing process of a spray-in bed liner. Nozzle aperture, thinners, and spray pressure can be modified to allow proper distribution of the spray lining chemicals.

== Differences in spray-on bed liners ==
Spray-on bed liner material can vary in texture as well as color. Texture can be smooth for easy cleaning or rough to prevent skidding.

Polyurethane can be sprayed from 1/16 inch to 1/4 inch, depending on the application. Thinner coatings may cost less but can chip and crack. Thicker coatings will alter the shape and size of the truck bed somewhat. For trucks with the most rugged use, Armor Thane sets an optimum thickness for bed liners as 1/4 inch on the bed and wheel wells and 1/8 inch on the sides.

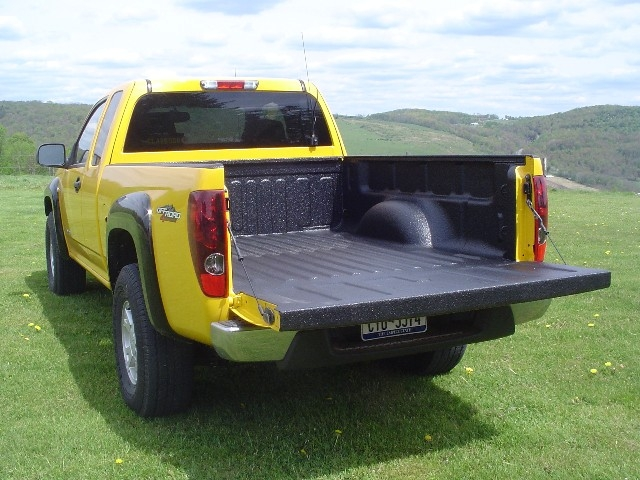
Truck bedliner applied with a spray-on technique

When applied correctly, the value of a truck bed liner is that it resists denting, scratching, and holds its shape firmly, yet is flexible enough to not crack when navigating through rough terrain. Unlike a metal bed, it absorbs vibration to protect cargo. Whereas painted metal will chip and rust under rough conditions, polyurethane coatings prevent damage from scratching and from most chemicals, and therefore avoid rusting.

Spray-on truck bed liners require a professional applicator who has the training and experience to follow the process and deliver a smooth, even surface. The process requires sanding to create a surface for the polyurethane to attach. This allows the polyurethane to bond permanently so it will not bubble even in extreme weather.

The choice of colors is virtually unlimited. A color matching system sprays to OEM specs or owners can choose custom colors. Adding an ultraviolet stabilizer maintains the appearance even in prolonged direct sunlight.

== Spray-on bed liner material for other uses ==
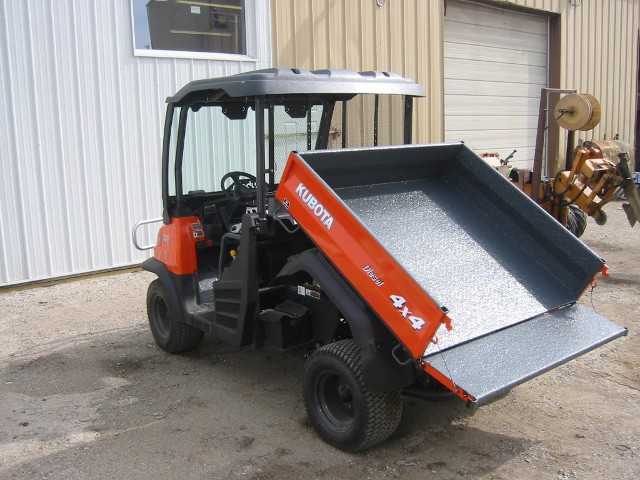
Protect any size truck from work abuse

These spray-on polyurethane coatings are not just for truck bed liners. They also protect fenders, bumpers, floorboards, nerf bars, and trim. In fact, whole vehicles have been sprayed. The same polyurethane spray can be applied to emergency vehicles, commercial transport, heavy construction, agriculture equipment, and boats.

Spraying polyurethane serves two purposes. First, it adds years of service by preventing scratching, rusting, and chemical contamination from deteriorating standard OEM paint. Second, it can create a roughed-up, anti-skid or anti-slip surface.

Some polyurea coatings, using a similar spray system, have been applied to military and private vehicles for blast mitigation.

The Myth Busters tested myths about the toughness of spray-on truck bed liner resin in 2011 and confirmed it to be adequate protection against dents in minor crashes (applied on a car), dog bites (applied on a jacket), and explosive blasts (applied on a wooden or brick wall).

== Polyurethane spray bed liners ==
The bed liner industry offers many custom polyurea, polyurethane, and polyurea formulations. Polyureas and polyurethanes have significant differences chemically but act similarly in many applications. There are also differences in the application process and the level of isocyanates and VOCs. The presence of VOCs and isocyanates prevents the application of spray bed liners in many states, or places restrictions on how the material can be applied.

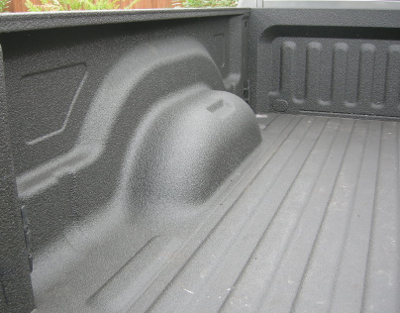
Spray-Lining Polyurea-Polyurethane Bed liner

== Other applications ==
Additives can be applied to coatings to provide different characteristics; the protective coatings can be applied in many other environments and have a variety of needs and purposes besides a simple truck bed liner.

In recent years, it has become more popular to use bed liners to coat the exterior of vehicles as well. This trend is, among other things, due to increased availability and a greater variety of colors offered. Due to the waterproof and the anti-corrosive nature of the polyurethane blends, they are also used as a coating for the interiors of boats.

== HMW/UHMW Medium to heavy-duty poly dump bed liners ==
=== Super heavy-duty UHMW asphalt liner ===
The most versatile dump bed liner can handle hot asphalt one day and rocks or concrete on the next day, which could maximize the usage potential of dump equipment and lowering maintenance costs.

=== Heavy-duty UHMW liner ===
“Heavy Duty” dump body bed liners allow for low scope dumping, and less sticking and freezing while protecting the bed from heavy, abrasive loads in steel and aluminum dump bodies and trailers.

== Origin of the polyurethane liner ==
It was created in 1983, by American Made Liner Systems, now a division of American Made Systems, Inc.

=== Purpose of the original dump bed liner ===
- Permanent protection for dump bodies
- Lower scope dumping reduces chances of roll-over
- Less sticking and freezing of loads
- Higher profits with fewer carrybacks and more hauls per day
