= 2-Aminopyridine =

Names
- Preferred IUPAC name Pyridin-2-amine
- Other names 2-Pyridinamine; 2-Pyridylamine; α-Aminopyridine; α-Pyridylamine

Identifiers
CAS Number	504-29-0
3D model (JSmol)	Interactive image; Interactive image
ChEMBL	ChEMBL21619
ChemSpider	10008
ECHA InfoCard	100.007.263
EC Number	207-988-4
PubChem CID	10439
RTECS number	US1575000
UNII	WSX981HEWU
UN number	2671
CompTox Dashboard (EPA)	DTXSID0024505
- InChI: InChI=1S/C5H6N2/c6-5-3-1-2-4-7-5/h1-4H,(H2,6,7) Key: ICSNLGPSRYBMBD-UHFFFAOYSA-N; InChI=1/C5H6N2/c6-5-3-1-2-4-7-5/h1-4H,(H2,6,7) Key: ICSNLGPSRYBMBD-UHFFFAOYAM
- SMILES: n1ccccc1N; c1ccnc(c1)N

Properties
Chemical formula	C_{5}H_{6}N_{2}
Molar mass	94.117 g·mol^{−1}
Appearance	colourless solid
Melting point	59 to 60 °C (138 to 140 °F; 332 to 333 K)
Boiling point	210 °C (410 °F; 483 K)
Solubility in water	>100%

Hazards
- GHS labelling
Pictograms	(GHS06: Toxic) (GHS07: Exclamation mark) (GHS09: Environmental hazard)
Signal word	Danger
Hazard statements	H301, H311, H312, H315, H319, H335, H411
Precautionary statements	P261, P264, P270, P271, P273, P280, P301+P310, P302+P352, P304+P340, P305+P351+P338, P312, P321, P322, P330, P332+P313, P337+P313, P361, P362, P363, P391, P403+P233, P405, P501
Flash point	68 °C; 154 °F; 341 K
- Lethal dose or concentration (LD, LC)
LD_{50} (median dose)	200 mg/kg (rat, oral); 50 mg/kg (mouse, oral)
- NIOSH (US health exposure limits)
PEL (Permissible)	TWA 0.5 ppm (2 mg/m^{3})
REL (Recommended)	TWA 0.5 ppm (2 mg/m^{3})
IDLH (Immediate danger)	5 ppm
- Except where otherwise noted, data are given for materials in their standard state (at 25 °C [77 °F], 100 kPa). verify (what is ?) Infobox references

2-Aminopyridine is an organic compound with the formula H_{2}NC_{5}H_{4}N. It is one of three isomeric aminopyridines. It is a colourless solid that is used in the production of the drugs piroxicam, sulfapyridine, tenoxicam, and tripelennamine. It is produced by the reaction of sodium amide with pyridine, the Chichibabin reaction.

== Reactions ==
The bifunctionality of 2-aminopyridine is illustrated by this 1:2 adduct with maleic anhydride.

Although 2-hydroxypyridine converts significantly to the pyridone tautomer, the related imine tautomer (HNC_{5}H_{4}NH) is less important for 2-aminopyridine.

2-Aminopyridine catalyzes the conversion of maleic anhydride to 2,3-dimethylmaleic anhydride.

== Toxicity ==
The acute toxicity is indicated by the LD_{50} = 200 mg/kg (rat, oral).
