= Vanadium phosphates =

Group of vanadium compounds used as oxidation catalysts

Identifiers
CAS Number	(anhydrous): 12359-27-2; (dihydrate): 12293-87-7
3D model (JSmol)	(anhydrous): Interactive image; (dihydrate): Interactive image
ChemSpider	(anhydrous): 65999272; (dihydrate): 67027654
- InChI: (anhydrous): InChI=1S/H3O4P.O.V/c1-5(2,3)4;;/h(H3,1,2,3,4);;/q;;+3/p-3 Key: MEVGAPWXIYXSPM-UHFFFAOYSA-K; (dihydrate): InChI=1S/H3O4P.2H2O.O.V/c1-5(2,3)4;;;;/h(H3,1,2,3,4);2*1H2;;/q;;;;+3/p-3 Key: IZKARBHCKXOZGC-UHFFFAOYSA-K
- SMILES: (anhydrous): [O-]P(=O)([O-])[O-].O=[V+3]; (dihydrate): O.O.[O-]P(=O)([O-])[O-].O=[V+3]

Properties
Chemical formula	H_{4}O_{7}PV (dihydrate)
Molar mass	197.94 (dihydrate)
Appearance	yellow solid (dihydrate)
Solubility in water	insoluble
- Except where otherwise noted, data are given for materials in their standard state (at 25 °C [77 °F], 100 kPa). Infobox references

Vanadium phosphates are inorganic compounds with the formula VO_{x}PO_{4} as well related hydrates with the formula VO_{x}PO_{4}·nH_{2}O. Some of these compounds are used commercially as catalysts for oxidation reactions.

== Vanadium(V) phosphates ==
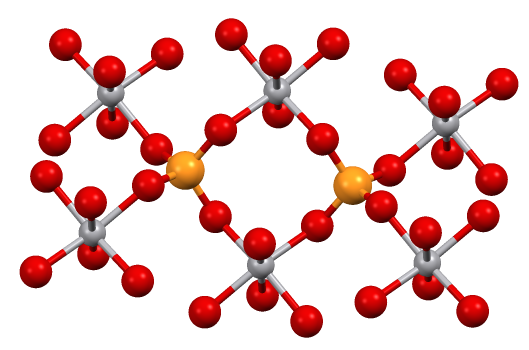
Structure of the V–O–P framework of VOPO_{4}(H_{2}O)_{2} (one lattice water and all hydrogen atoms are omitted).

A common vanadium phosphate is VOPO_{4}·2H_{2}O.

Seven polymorphs are known for anhydrous VOPO_{4}, denoted α_{I}, α_{II}, β, γ, δ, ω, and ε. (Note: The α_{I} and α_{II} polymorphs are sometimes called α_{1} and α_{2} instead.) These materials are composed of the vanadyl group (VO) and phosphate (PO^{3−}_{4}). They are yellow, diamagnetic solids, although when contaminated with vanadium(IV) derivatives, samples exhibit EPR signals and have bluish cast. For these materials, vanadyl refers to both vanadium(V) oxo and vanadium(IV) oxo centers, although conventionally vanadyl is reserved for derivatives of VO^{2+}.

=== Preparation, reactions, and applications of VOPO_{4}·2H_{2}O ===
Heating a suspension of vanadium pentoxide and phosphoric acid gives VOPO_{4}·2H_{2}O, isolated as a bright yellow solid. According to X-ray crystallography, the V(V) centers are octahedral, with long, weak bonds to aquo ligands.

Reduction of this compound with alcohols gives the vanadium(IV) phosphates.

These compounds are catalysts for the oxidation of butane to maleic anhydride. A key step in the activation of these catalysts is the conversion of VO(HPO_{4})·1/2H_{2}O to the pyrophosphate (VO)_{2}(P_{2}O_{7}). This material (CAS 58834-75-6 ) is called vanadyl pyrophosphate as well as vanadium oxide pyrophosphate.

== Vanadium(IV) phosphates ==
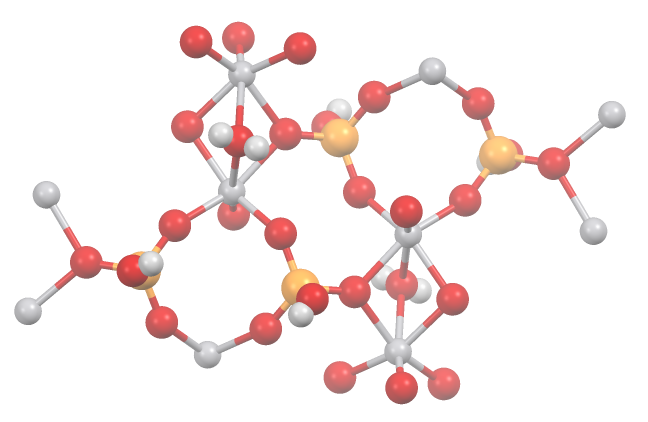
Portion of the crystal structure of VO(HPO_{4})·1/2H_{2}O. The vanadium is octahedrally coordinated and phosphorus is tetrahedral. Water is a bridging ligand. Color code: red = O; gray = V, H; ochre = P.

Several vanadium(IV) phosphates are known. These materials are typically blue. In these species, the phosphate anion is singly or doubly protonated. Examples include the hydrogenphosphates, VOHPO_{4}·4H_{2}O and VO(HPO_{4})·1/2H_{2}O, as well as the dihydrogen phosphate VO(H_{2}PO_{4})_{2}.

== Vanadium(III) phosphates ==
Vanadium(III) phosphates lacking the oxo ligand have the formula VPO_{4}·H_{2}O and VPO_{4}·2H_{2}O. The monohydrate is isostructural with MgSO_{4}·H_{2}O It adopts the structure of the corresponding hydrated aluminium phosphate. Oxidation of VPO_{4}·H_{2}O yields the two-electron electroactive material ε-VOPO_{4}.
