= Dimethyl maleate =

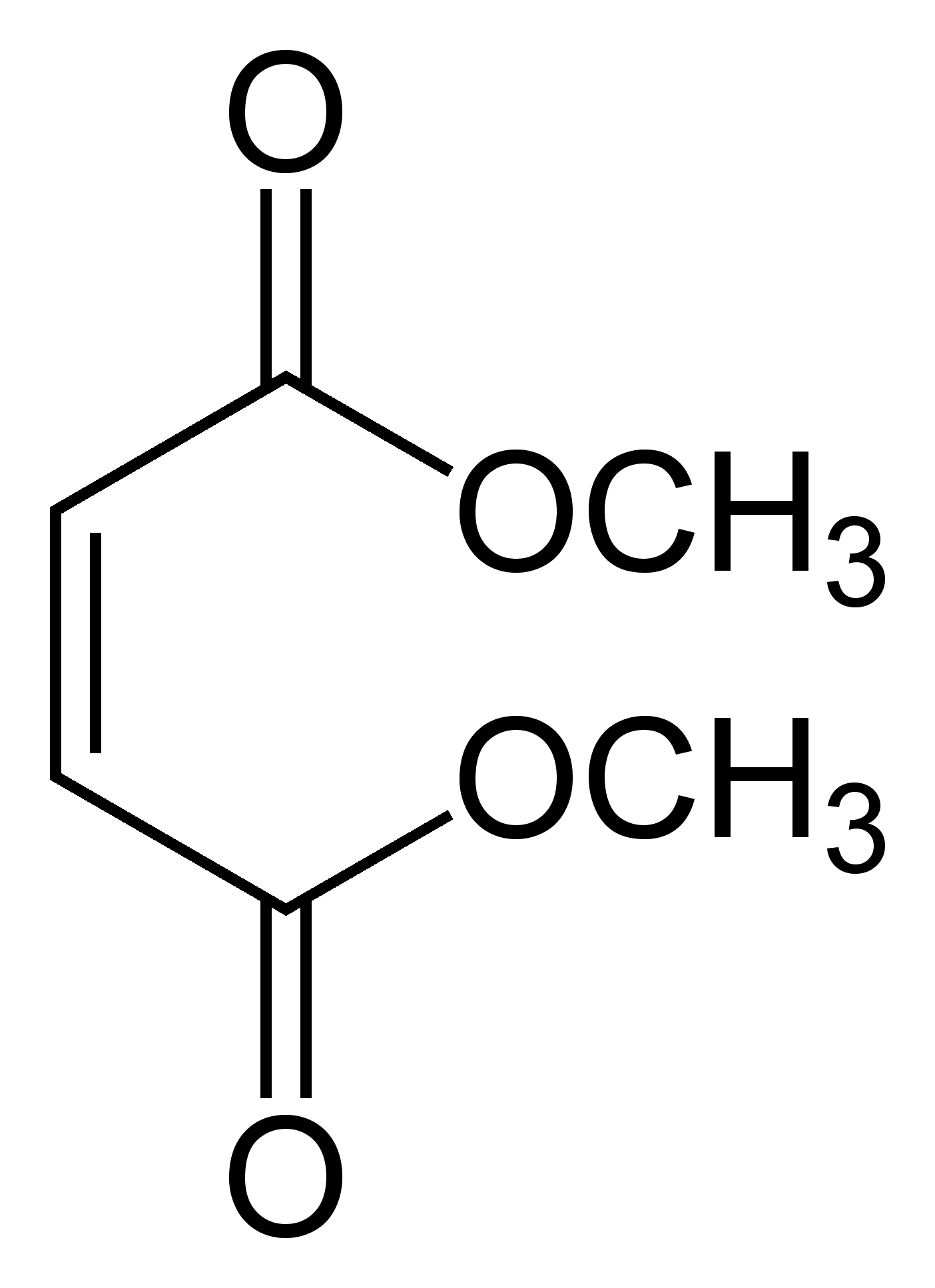

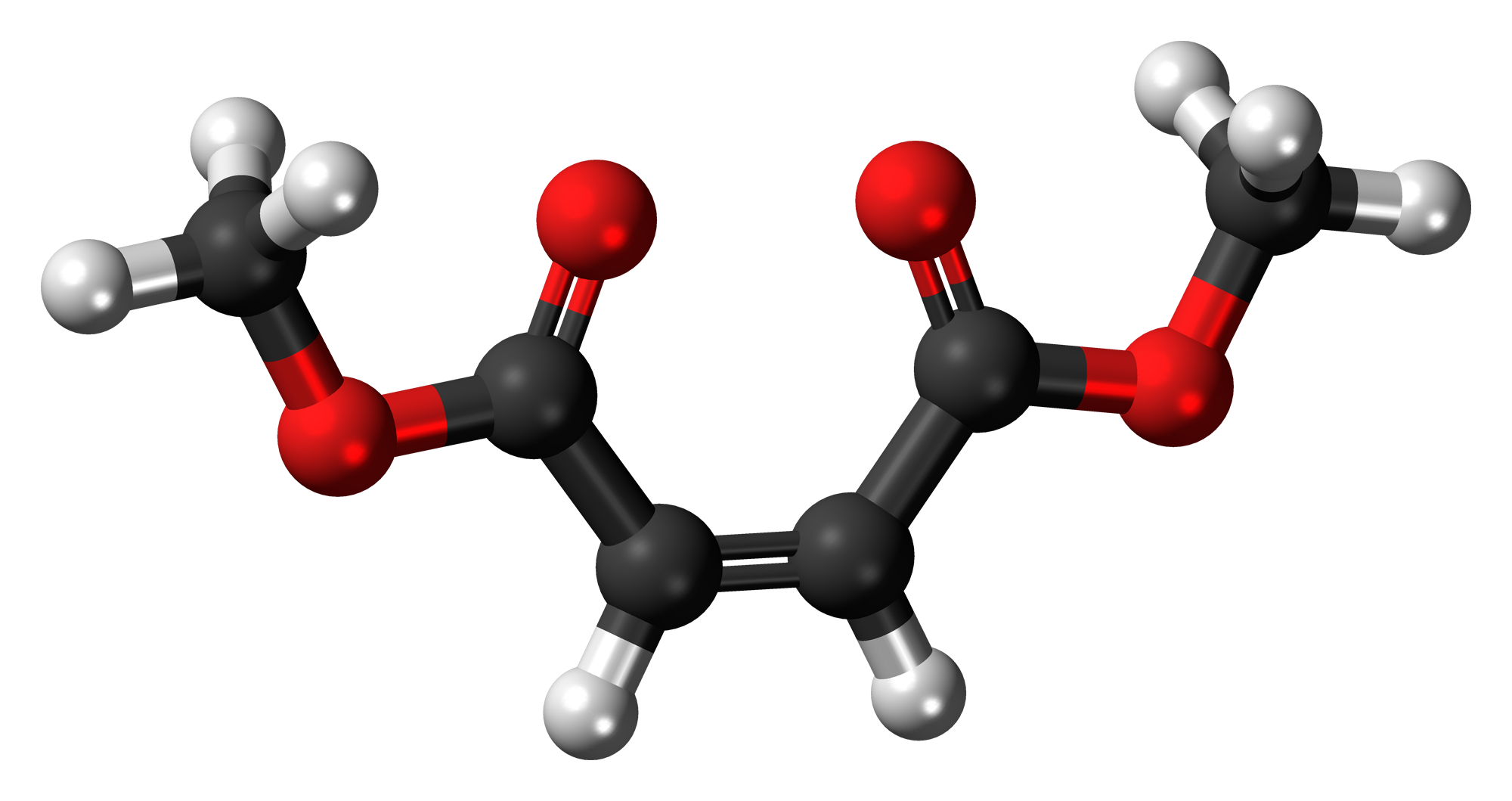

Names
- Preferred IUPAC name Dimethyl (2Z)-but-2-enedioate
- Other names Dimethyl maleate Maleic acid dimethyl ester Methyl maleate sipomer DMM; 2-Butenedioic acid, dimethyl ester 2-Butenedioic acid (Z)-,dimethyl ester

Identifiers
CAS Number	624-48-6
3D model (JSmol)	Interactive image
Beilstein Reference	471705
ChEBI	CHEBI:35460
ChEMBL	ChEMBL2259700
ChemSpider	4436352
ECHA InfoCard	100.009.862
EC Number	210-848-5
PubChem CID	5271565
RTECS number	EM6300000
UNII	K39366X5N0
CompTox Dashboard (EPA)	DTXSID4040765
- InChI: InChI=1S/C6H8O4/c1-9-5(7)3-4-6(8)10-2/h3-4H,1-2H3/b4-3- Key: LDCRTTXIJACKKU-ARJAWSKDSA-N; InChI=1/C6H8O4/c1-9-5(7)3-4-6(8)10-2/h3-4H,1-2H3/b4-3- Key: LDCRTTXIJACKKU-ARJAWSKDBU
- SMILES: O=C(OC)\C=C/C(=O)OC

Properties
Chemical formula	C_{6}H_{8}O_{4}
Molar mass	144.13 g/mol
Appearance	clear, colorless, oily liquid
Density	1.15 g/cm^{3}
Melting point	−17 °C (1 °F; 256 K)
Boiling point	204 to 207 °C (399 to 405 °F; 477 to 480 K)
Solubility in water	slightly soluble

Hazards
- GHS labelling
Pictograms	(GHS05: Corrosive) (GHS07: Exclamation mark)
Signal word	Danger
Hazard statements	H302, H314, H317, H335
Precautionary statements	P260, P264, P270, P271, P272, P280, P301+P312, P301+P330+P331, P302+P352, P303+P361+P353, P304+P340, P305+P351+P338, P310, P312, P321, P330, P333+P313, P363, P403+P233, P405, P501
NFPA 704 (fire diamond)	1 1 0
Flash point	95 °C (203 °F; 368 K)
- Except where otherwise noted, data are given for materials in their standard state (at 25 °C [77 °F], 100 kPa). verify (what is ?) Infobox references

Dimethyl maleate is an organic compound with the formula C_{6}H_{8}O_{4}. It is the dimethyl ester of maleic acid.

== Synthesis ==
Dimethyl maleate can be synthesized from maleic anhydride and methanol, with sulfuric acid acting as acid catalyst, via a nucleophilic acyl substitution for the monomethyl ester, followed by a Fischer esterification reaction for the dimethyl ester.

== Applications ==
Dimethyl maleate is used in many organic syntheses as a dienophile for diene synthesis. It is used as an additive and intermediate for plastics, pigments, pharmaceuticals, and agricultural products. It is also an intermediate for the production of paints, adhesives, and copolymers.

Dimethyl maleate has also found use in applications where improvements in the hardness and toughness of polymer films are desired. This includes, in particular, the improvement of anti-blocking properties of copolymers of vinyl acetate with DMM. It is also used as an internal modifier to increase the glass transition temperature of styrene or vinyl chloride polymers.

== Chemistry ==
Hydrolysis of dimethyl maleate gives maleic acid, or possibly the maleic acid monomethyl ester. Hydration of the same compound gives malic acid.

== See also ==
- Dimethyl fumarate
- Diethyl maleate
