= Polyaspartic esters =

Class of polymers

Polyaspartic ester chemistry was first introduced in the early 1990s making it a relatively new technology. The patents were issued to Bayer in Germany and Miles Corporation in the United States. It utilizes the aza-Michael addition reaction. These products are then used in coatings, adhesives, sealants and elastomers. Pure polyurea reacts extremely quickly making them almost unusable without plural component spray equipment. Polyaspartic technology utilizes a partially blocked amine to react more slowly with the isocyanates and thus produce a modified polyurea. The amine/diamine or even triamine functional coreactant for aliphatic polyisocyanate is typically reacted with a maleate. Polyaspartic esters (PAE) initially found use in conventional solvent-borne two-component polyurethane coatings.

== Chemistry ==
To manufacture a polyaspartic ester, an amine is reacted with dialkyl maleate by the aza-Michael reaction. Diethyl maleate is the usual maleate used. This converts the primary amines to secondary amines and also introduces bulky groups to the molecule which causes steric hindrance, slowing the reaction down. As the resulting aspartic molecule is now much bigger, less of the isocyanate is needed on a weight for weight basis. The isocyanate is often the most expensive part of the system especially if an aliphatic isocyanate oligomer is used and so may result in an overall lower system cost per applied film thickness. Isocyanates are known pulmonary sensitizers and hence oligomeric forms are often used with polyaspartic technology as these are much less volatile.

== Uses ==
Eventually, the advantages of using polyaspartic esters as the main component of the co-reactant for reaction with an aliphatic polyisocyanate in low to zero volatile organic compound (VOC) coatings were realized. The rate of reaction of polyaspartic esters can be manipulated, thus extending the pot life and controlling the cure rate of aliphatic coatings. This allows formulators to create high solids coatings systems which are user-friendly with longer working times and still maintain a fast-cure. Traditional aliphatic polyurea formulations required high-pressure, temperature-controlled plural component spray systems to be applied due to fast initial reaction rates. Aliphatic polyaspartics can be formulated with slower reaction rates to accommodate batch-mixing and application by roller-applied methods or spray-applied through conventional single components paint sprayers without the use of solvent. As with aliphatic polyurethane or acrylic coatings, polyaspartic coatings made with aliphatic isocyanates and derivatives are UV and light stable and have a low yellowing tendency. When coating concrete, polyaspartics can be installed in both clear and pigmented form. Additionally, broadcast media such as quartz and/or vinyl paint chips can be incorporating, as well as metallic pigments.

== Polymer science ==
Once the aspartic ester is formed, it is basically a sterically hindered diamine and thus in polymer science terms is a Chain extender rather than a chain terminator. Chain extenders (f = 2) and cross linkers (f ≥ 3) are low molecular weight amine terminated compounds that play an important role in polyurea compounds, coatings, elastomers and adhesives. However, the isocyanate component is often an oligomer that is trifunctional and so the crosslinking comes from that part of the cured polymer.

== See also ==
- Diethyl maleate – Chemical compound
- Isocyanate – Chemical group (–N=C=O)
- Polyurea – Class of elastomers
- Polyurethane – Polymer composed of a chain of organic units joined by carbamate (urethane) links

== External websites ==
- Covestro (formerly Bayer Material Science)
- Arnette Polymers LLC
- Pflaumer Aspartic amines
- Cargill Polyaspartate product line
- TSE Industries
