= Octenylsuccinic acid =

Names
- IUPAC name 2-[(E)-oct-1-enyl]butanedioic acid
- Other names (1E)-1-Octenylsuccinic acid

Identifiers
CAS Number	28805-58-5
3D model (JSmol)	Interactive image
ChemSpider	9451246
ECHA InfoCard	100.044.753
EC Number	249-244-1
PubChem CID	11276246
UNII	12UZE4X73L
CompTox Dashboard (EPA)	DTXSID0036471
- InChI: InChI=1S/C12H20O4/c1-2-3-4-5-6-7-8-10(12(15)16)9-11(13)14/h7-8,10H,2-6,9H2,1H3,(H,13,14)(H,15,16)/b8-7+ Key: KCYQMQGPYWZZNJ-BQYQJAHWSA-N
- SMILES: CCCCCC/C=C/C(CC(=O)O)C(=O)O

Properties
Chemical formula	C_{12}H_{20}O_{4}
Molar mass	228.288 g·mol^{−1}

Hazards
- GHS labelling
Pictograms	(GHS05: Corrosive)
Signal word	Danger
Hazard statements	H314
Precautionary statements	P260, P264, P280, P301+P330+P331, P303+P361+P353, P304+P340, P305+P351+P338, P310, P321, P363, P405, P501
- Except where otherwise noted, data are given for materials in their standard state (at 25 °C [77 °F], 100 kPa). Infobox references

Octenylsuccinic acid is a manufactured ingredient in foods. It is used to treat gum arabic, and also in waxy maize production and for rice starch production.

== See also ==
- Octenyl succinic acid modified gum arabic
