= Maleic acid =

Dicarboxylic acid

- Skeletal formula of maleic acid

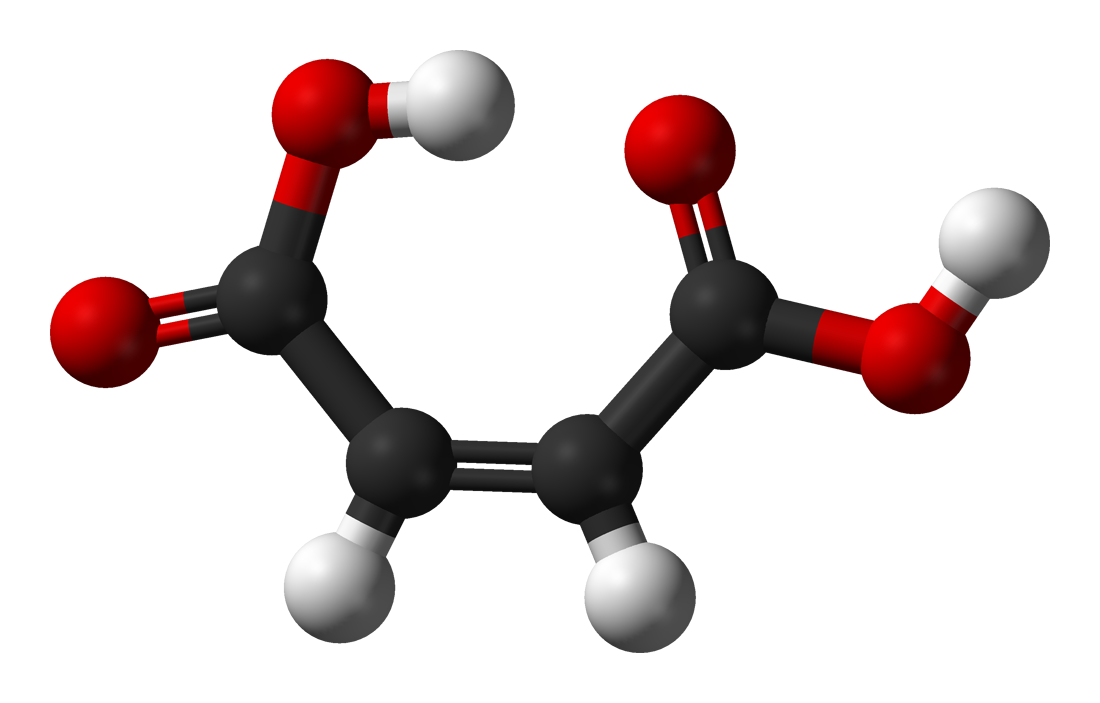
- Ball-and-stick model of the maleic acid molecule

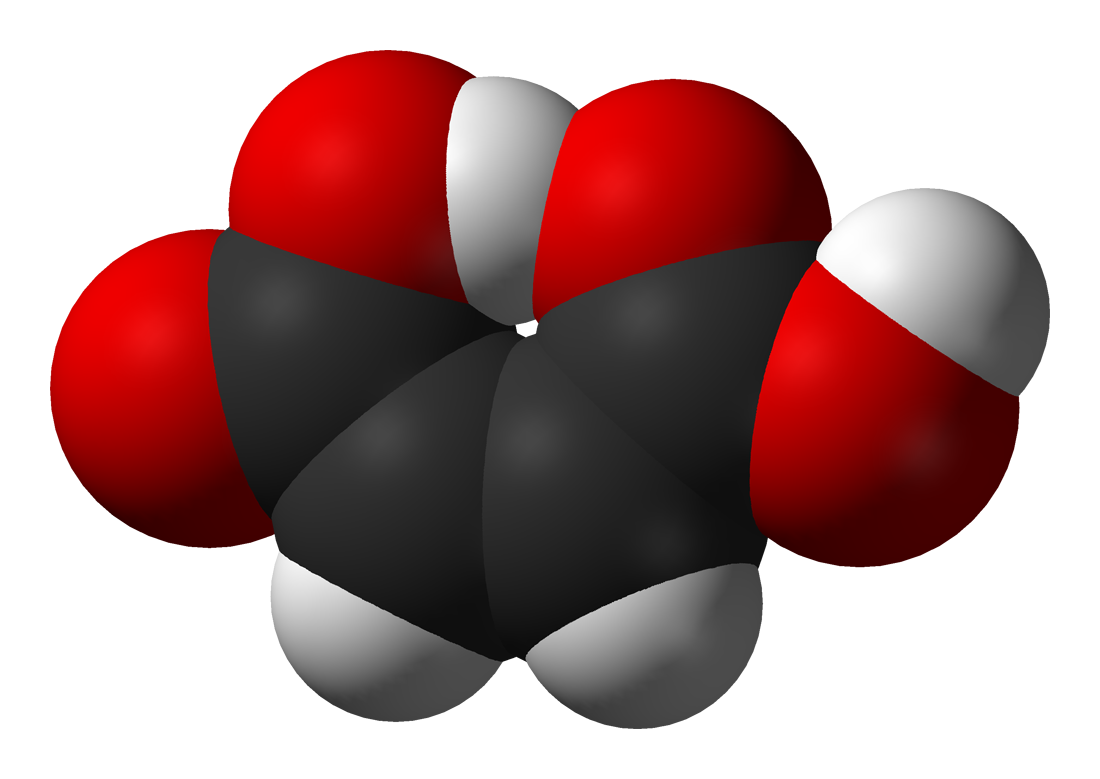
- Space-filling model of the maleic acid molecule

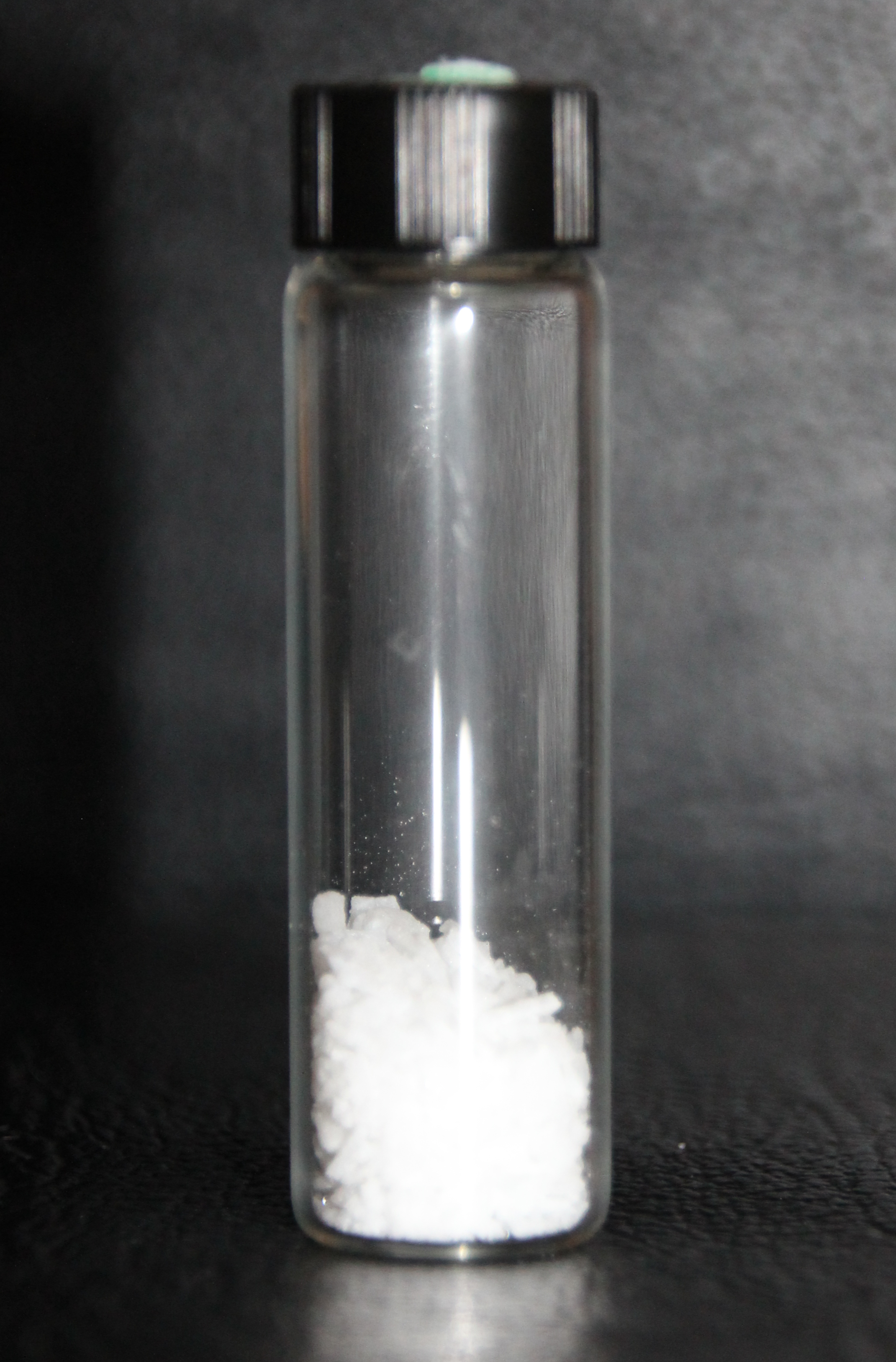

Names
- Preferred IUPAC name (2Z)-But-2-enedioic acid
- Other names (Z)-Butenedioic acid; cis-Butenedioic acid; Malenic acid; Maleinic acid; Toxilic acid

Identifiers
CAS Number	110-16-7
3D model (JSmol)	Interactive image
Beilstein Reference	605762
ChEBI	CHEBI:18300
ChEMBL	ChEMBL539648
ChemSpider	392248
DrugBank	DB04299
ECHA InfoCard	100.003.403
EC Number	203-742-5
Gmelin Reference	49854
KEGG	C01384
PubChem CID	444266
RTECS number	OM9625000
UNII	91XW058U2C
CompTox Dashboard (EPA)	DTXSID8021517
- InChI: InChI=1S/C4H4O4/c5-3(6)1-2-4(7)8/h1-2H,(H,5,6)(H,7,8)/b2-1- Key: VZCYOOQTPOCHFL-UPHRSURJSA-N; InChI=1/C4H4O4/c5-3(6)1-2-4(7)8/h1-2H,(H,5,6)(H,7,8)/b2-1- Key: VZCYOOQTPOCHFL-UPHRSURJBG
- SMILES: O=C(O)\C=C/C(=O)O

Properties
Chemical formula	C_{4}H_{4}O_{4}
Molar mass	116.072 g·mol^{−1}
Appearance	White solid
Density	1.59 g/cm^{3}
Melting point	135 °C (275 °F; 408 K) (decomposes)
Solubility in water	478.8 g/L at 20 C
Acidity (pK_{a})	pK_{a1} = 1.90 pK_{a2} = 6.07
Magnetic susceptibility (χ)	−49.71×10^{−6} cm^{3}/mol

Hazards
- GHS labelling
Pictograms	(GHS07: Exclamation mark)
Signal word	Warning
Hazard statements	H302, H315, H317, H319, H335
Precautionary statements	P261, P264, P270, P271, P272, P280, P301+P312, P302+P352, P304+P340, P305+P351+P338, P312, P321, P330, P332+P313, P333+P313, P337+P313, P362, P363, P403+P233, P405, P501
NFPA 704 (fire diamond)	3 0 0
Safety data sheet (SDS)	MSDS from J. T. Baker

Related compounds
Related carboxylic acids	fumaric acid succinic acid crotonic acid
Related compounds	maleic anhydride maleimide
- Except where otherwise noted, data are given for materials in their standard state (at 25 °C [77 °F], 100 kPa). verify (what is ?) Infobox references

Maleic acid or cis-butenedioic acid is an organic compound that is a dicarboxylic acid, a molecule with two carboxyl groups. Its chemical formula is HO_{2}CCH=CHCO_{2}H. Maleic acid is the cis isomer of butenedioic acid, whereas fumaric acid is the trans isomer. Maleic acid is mainly used as a precursor to fumaric acid, and relative to its parent maleic anhydride, which has many applications.

== Etymology ==
'Maleic acid' from the French acide maléique altered from acide malique, malic acid, from which it was synthesised. The word 'malic' is derived from Latin mālum, meaning 'apple'.

== Physical properties ==
Maleic acid has a heat of combustion of −1,355.2 kJ/mol, −20.5 kJ/mol higher than that of fumaric acid. Maleic acid is more soluble in water than fumaric acid. The melting point of maleic acid (135 °C) is also much lower than that of fumaric acid (287 °C). As confirmed by X-ray crystallography, maleic acid is planar. Two normal hydrogen bonds are observed, one intramolecular and one intermolecular. Crystallographic analysis shows that the intramolecular hydrogen bond is little affected in the monopotassium salt.

== Hydrotropic properties ==
Maleic acid has strong hydrotropic properties discovered by Dr. J.Y. Zhu at the USDA Forest Products Laboratory. Maleic acid can rapidly dissolve a large amount of plant (including wood) biomass lignin in aqueous systems at low temperatures around 100°C for only 20 min. Using Maleic acid as an acid hydrotrope to fractionate (MAHF) plant biomass results in lignin (both the dissolved lignin and the residue lignin in the lignocellulosic substrate) esterification. Due to the rapid and low temperature fractionation and esterification, the dissolved lignin has light color with a low degree of condensation, favorable for producing aromatics through further depolymerization. Lignin esterification results in surface charge, which can be utilized to induce an electric static repulsive interaction between the MAHF lignocellulosic substrate and cellulase enzymes through pH mediation to substantially decrease nonproductive cellulase binding to the substrate and nearly double enzymatic saccharification yield, significant to plant biomass biorefinery.

== Production and industrial applications ==
In industry, maleic acid is derived by hydrolysis of maleic anhydride, the latter being produced by oxidation of benzene or butane.

Maleic acid is an industrial raw material for the production of glyoxylic acid by ozonolysis.

Maleic acid may be used to form acid addition salts with drugs to make them more stable, such as indacaterol maleate.

Maleic acid is also used as an adhesion promoter for different substrates, such as nylon and zinc coated metals e.g galvanized steel, in methyl methacrylate based adhesives.

=== Isomerization to fumaric acid ===
The major industrial use of maleic acid is its conversion to fumaric acid. This conversion, an isomerization, is catalysed by a variety of reagents, such as mineral acids and thiourea. Again, the large difference in water solubility makes fumaric acid purification easy.

The isomerization is a popular topic in schools. Maleic acid and fumaric acid do not spontaneously interconvert because rotation around a carbon carbon double bond is not energetically favourable. However, conversion of the cis isomer into the trans isomer is possible by photolysis in the presence of a small amount of bromine. Light converts elemental bromine into a bromine radical, which attacks the alkene in a radical addition reaction to a bromo-alkane radical; and now single bond rotation is possible. The bromine radicals recombine and fumaric acid is formed. The use of catalytic amounts of aqueous thiyl radicals also accelerates the isomerization reaction. In another method (used as a classroom demonstration), maleic acid is transformed into fumaric acid through the process of heating the maleic acid in hydrochloric acid solution. Reversible addition (of H^{+}) leads to free rotation about the central C–C bond and formation of the more stable and less soluble fumaric acid.

Some bacteria produce the enzyme maleate isomerase, which is used by bacteria in nicotinate metabolism. This enzyme catalyses isomerization between fumarate and maleate.

== Other reactions ==
Although not practised commercially, maleic acid can be converted into maleic anhydride by dehydration, to malic acid by hydration, and to succinic acid by hydrogenation (ethanol / palladium on carbon). It reacts with thionyl chloride or phosphorus pentachloride to give the maleic acid chloride (it is not possible to isolate the monoacid chloride). Maleic acid, being electrophilic, participates as a dienophile in many Diels–Alder reactions.

== Maleates ==
The maleate ion is the ionized form of maleic acid. The maleate ion is useful in biochemistry as an inhibitor of transaminase reactions. Maleic acid esters are also called maleates, for instance dimethyl maleate.

=== Use in pharmaceutical drugs ===
Many drugs that contain amines are provided as the maleate acid salt, for example, carfenazine, chlorpheniramine, pyrilamine, methylergonovine, and thiethylperazine.

== See also ==
- Fumaric acid
- Malic acid
- Malonic acid
- Succinic acid
