= Maleic anhydride =

Maleic anhydride
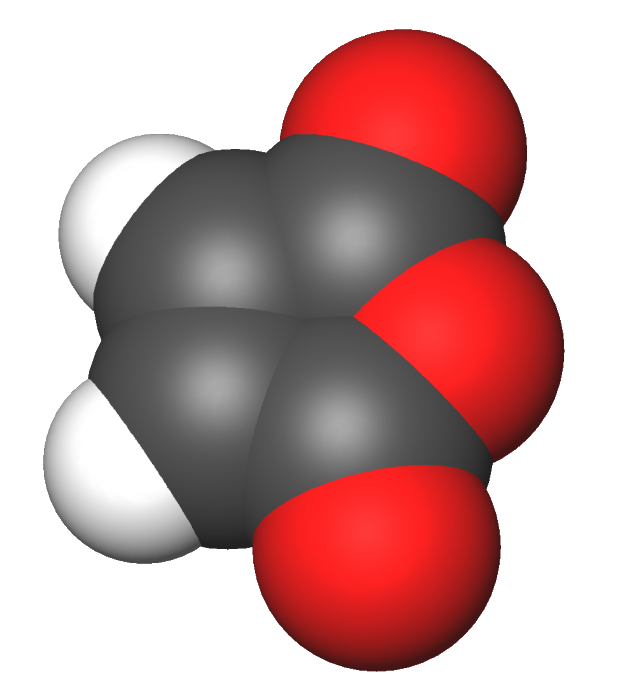

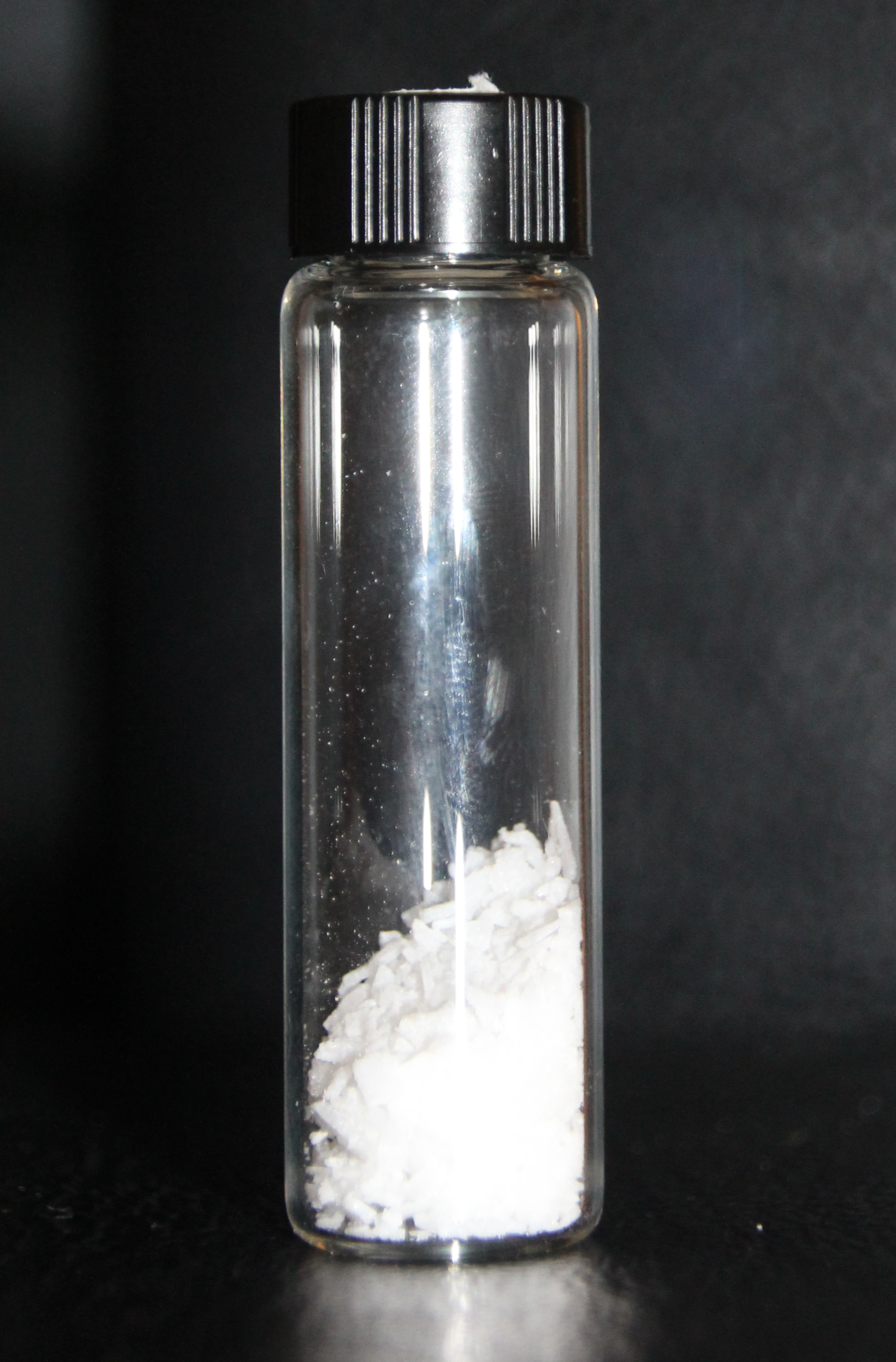

Names
- Preferred IUPAC name Furan-2,5-dione
- Other names Maleic anhydride cis-Butenedioic anhydride 2,5-Furanedione; Maleic acid anhydride Toxilic anhydride

Identifiers
CAS Number	108-31-6
3D model (JSmol)	Interactive image
Beilstein Reference	106909
ChEBI	CHEBI:474859
ChEMBL	ChEMBL374159
ChemSpider	7635
ECHA InfoCard	100.003.247
EC Number	203-571-6
Gmelin Reference	2728
PubChem CID	7923
RTECS number	ON3675000
UNII	V5877ZJZ25
UN number	2215
CompTox Dashboard (EPA)	DTXSID7024166
- InChI: InChI=1S/C4H2O3/c5-3-1-2-4(6)7-3/h1-2H Key: FPYJFEHAWHCUMM-UHFFFAOYSA-N; InChI=1/C4H2O3/c5-3-1-2-4(6)7-3/h1-2H Key: FPYJFEHAWHCUMM-UHFFFAOYAP
- SMILES: C1=CC(=O)OC1=O

Properties
Chemical formula	C_{4}H_{2}O_{3}
Molar mass	98.057 g·mol^{−1}
Appearance	White crystals or needles
Odor	irritating, choking
Density	1.48 g/cm^{3}
Melting point	52.8 °C (127.0 °F; 325.9 K)
Boiling point	202 °C (396 °F; 475 K)
Solubility in water	Reacts
Vapor pressure	0.2 mmHg (20°C)
Magnetic susceptibility (χ)	−35.8·10^{−6} cm^{3}/mol

Hazards
- GHS labelling
Pictograms	(GHS05: Corrosive) (GHS07: Exclamation mark) (GHS08: Health hazard)
Signal word	Danger
Hazard statements	H302, H314, H317, H334, H372
Precautionary statements	P260, P264, P270, P272, P280, P285, P301+P312, P301+P330+P331, P302+P352, P303+P361+P353, P304+P340, P304+P341, P305+P351+P338, P310, P314, P321, P330, P333+P313, P342+P311, P363, P405, P501
NFPA 704 (fire diamond)	3 1 1
Flash point	102 °C (216 °F; 375 K)
Explosive limits	1.4%-7.1%
- Lethal dose or concentration (LD, LC)
LD_{50} (median dose)	465 mg/kg (oral, mouse); 850 mg/kg (oral, rat); 875 mg/kg (oral, rabbit); 390 mg/kg (oral, guinea pig); 400 mg/kg (oral, rat)
- NIOSH (US health exposure limits)
PEL (Permissible)	TWA 1 mg/m^{3} (0.25 ppm)
REL (Recommended)	TWA 1 mg/m^{3} (0.25 ppm)
IDLH (Immediate danger)	10 mg/m^{3}
Safety data sheet (SDS)	MSDS at J. T. Baker

Related compounds
Related acid anhydrides	Succinic anhydride
Related compounds	Maleic acid
- Except where otherwise noted, data are given for materials in their standard state (at 25 °C [77 °F], 100 kPa). verify (what is ?) Infobox references

Maleic anhydride is an organic compound with the formula C_{2}H_{2}(CO)_{2}O. It is the acid anhydride of maleic acid. It is a colorless or white solid with an acrid odor. It is produced industrially on a large scale for applications in coatings and polymers.

== Structure and bonding ==
Maleic anhydride is a planar molecule. By virtue of the acid anhydride group, the alkene is electrophilic.

On account of its cycle of 4 π electrons in an array of 5 atoms with p orbitals, maleic anhydride was long thought to exhibit antiaromaticity. However, a thermochemical study concluded that only 8 kJ/mol of destabilization energy can be ascribed to this effect, making it weakly antiaromatic at best.

== Production ==
Maleic anhydride is produced by vapor-phase oxidation of n-butane. The overall process converts the methyl groups to carboxylate and dehydrogenates the backbone. The selectivity of the process reflects the robustness of maleic anhydride, with its conjugated double-bond system. Traditionally maleic anhydride was produced by the oxidation of benzene or other aromatic compounds. As of 2006, only a few smaller plants continue to use benzene.

In both cases, benzene and butane are fed into a stream of hot air, and the mixture is passed through a catalyst bed at high temperature. The ratio of air to hydrocarbon is controlled to prevent the mixture from igniting. Vanadium pentoxide and molybdenum trioxide are the catalysts used for the benzene route, whereas vanadium phosphate is used for the butane route:

C_{4}H_{10} + 3.5 O_{2} → C_{4}H_{2}O_{3} + 4 H_{2}O ∆H = −1236 kJ/mol

The main competing process entails full combustion of the butane, a conversion that is twice as exothermic as the partial oxidation.

The traditional method using benzene became uneconomical due to the high and still rising benzene prices and by complying with the regulations of benzene emissions. In addition, in the production of maleic anhydride (4 C-atoms) a third of the original carbon atoms is lost as carbon dioxide when using benzene (6 carbon atoms). The modern catalytic processes start from a 4-carbon molecule and only attaches oxygen and removes water; the 4-C-base body of the molecule remains intact. Overall, the newer method is therefore more material efficient.

Parallels exist with the production of phthalic anhydride: While older methods use naphthalene, modern methods use o-xylene as feedstock.

== Reactions ==
Selected derivatives of maleic anhydride: 2,3-Dimethylmaleic anhydride from dimerization using 2-aminopyridine as catalyst, tetrachlorolactone from treatment with phosphorus pentachloride, product of AlCl_{3}-catalyzed acylation of benzene, and product of ene reaction with propylene.

The chemistry of maleic anhydride is very rich, reflecting its ready availability and bifunctional reactivity. Maleic anhydride hydrolyzes, producing maleic acid, cis−HOOC−CH=CH−COOH. With alcohols, the half-ester is generated, e.g., cis−HOOC−CH=CH−COOCH_{3}. With amines, maleic anhydride gives maleamic acids.

Maleic anhydride is a classic substrate for Diels-Alder reactions. It was used for work in 1928, on the reaction between maleic anhydride and 1,3-butadiene, for which Otto Paul Hermann Diels and Kurt Alder were awarded the Nobel Prize in 1950. It is through this reaction that maleic anhydride is converted to many pesticides and pharmaceuticals. Their 1928 patent also provided many other examples of reactions involving maleic anhydride, such as the reaction with cyclopentadiene to form nadic anhydride.

At higher temperatures, the half salts, half esters of maleic acid undergo the Michael reaction with active methylene or methine compounds such as malonate or acetoacetate esters in the presence of sodium acetate catalyst. These intermediates were used for the same Krebs cycle intermediates aconitic and isocitric acids.

Maleic anhydride dimerizes in a photochemical reaction to form cyclobutane tetracarboxylic dianhydride (CBTA). This compound is used in the production of polyimides and as an alignment film for liquid crystal displays.

It is also a ligand forming metal-alkene complexes, examples being Pt(PPh_{3})_{2}(MA) and Fe(CO)_{4}(MA).

== Uses ==
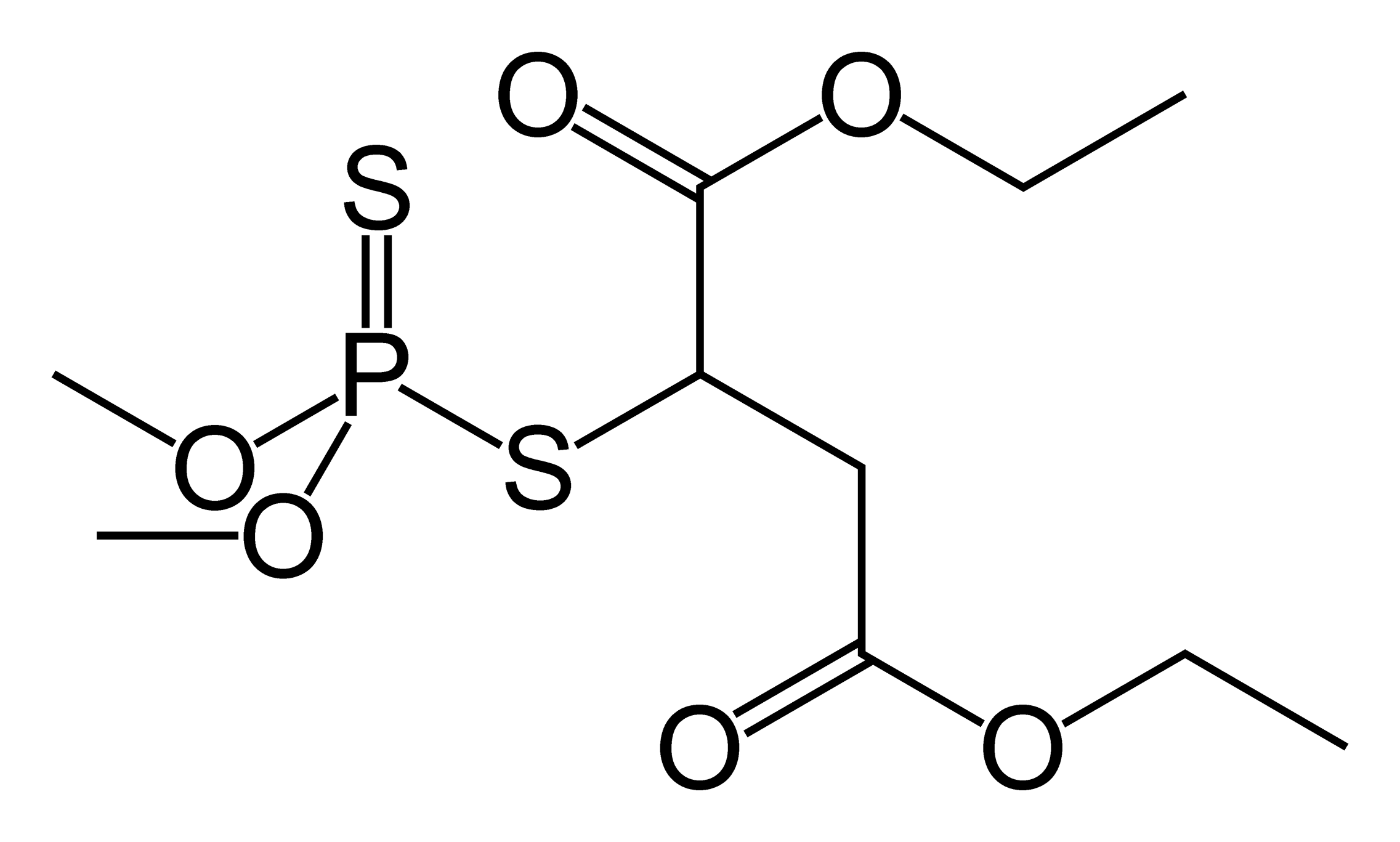
Malathion is a popular insecticide derived from maleic anhydride

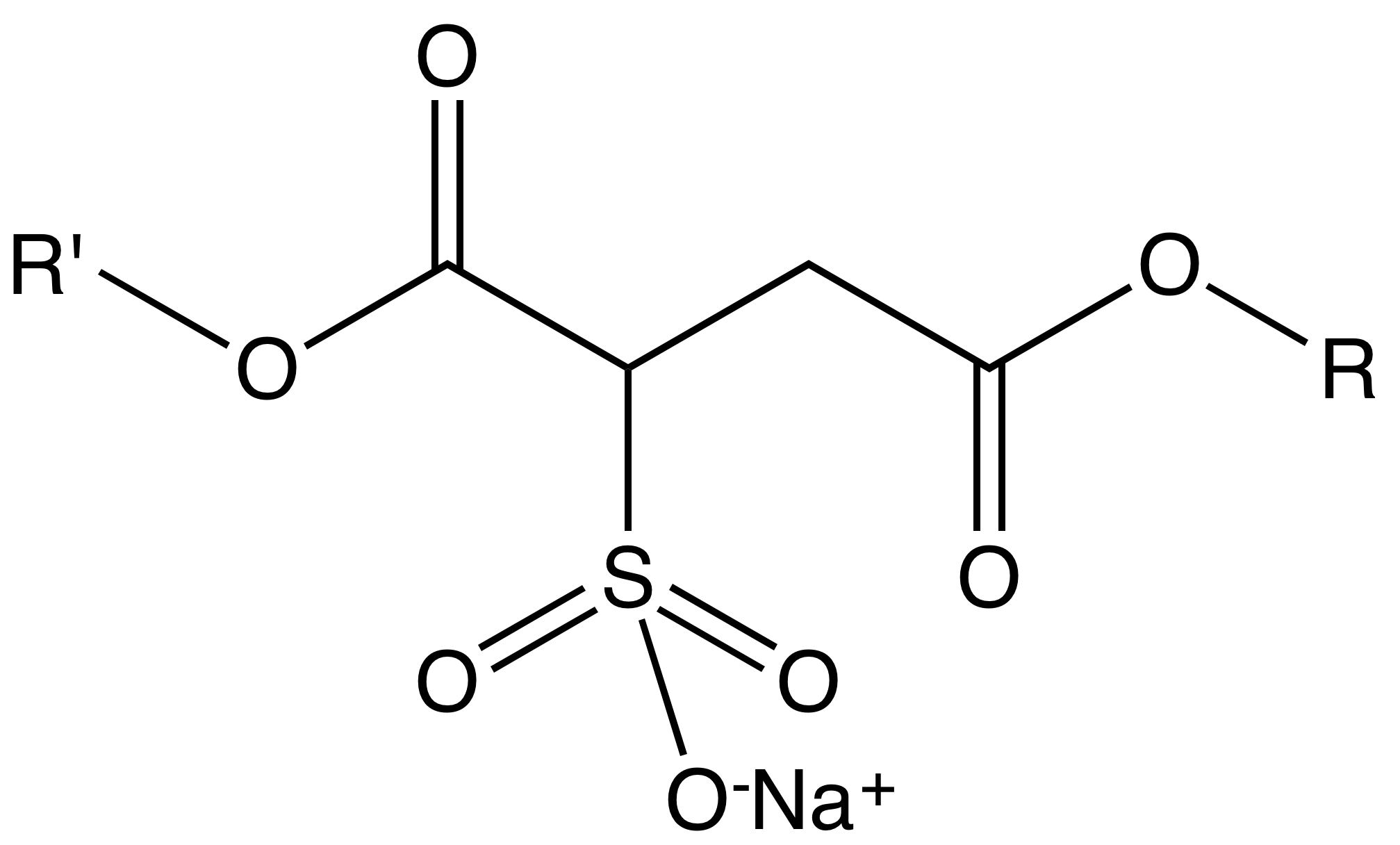
Sodium sulfosuccinate esters, common class of surfactants derived from maleic anhydride

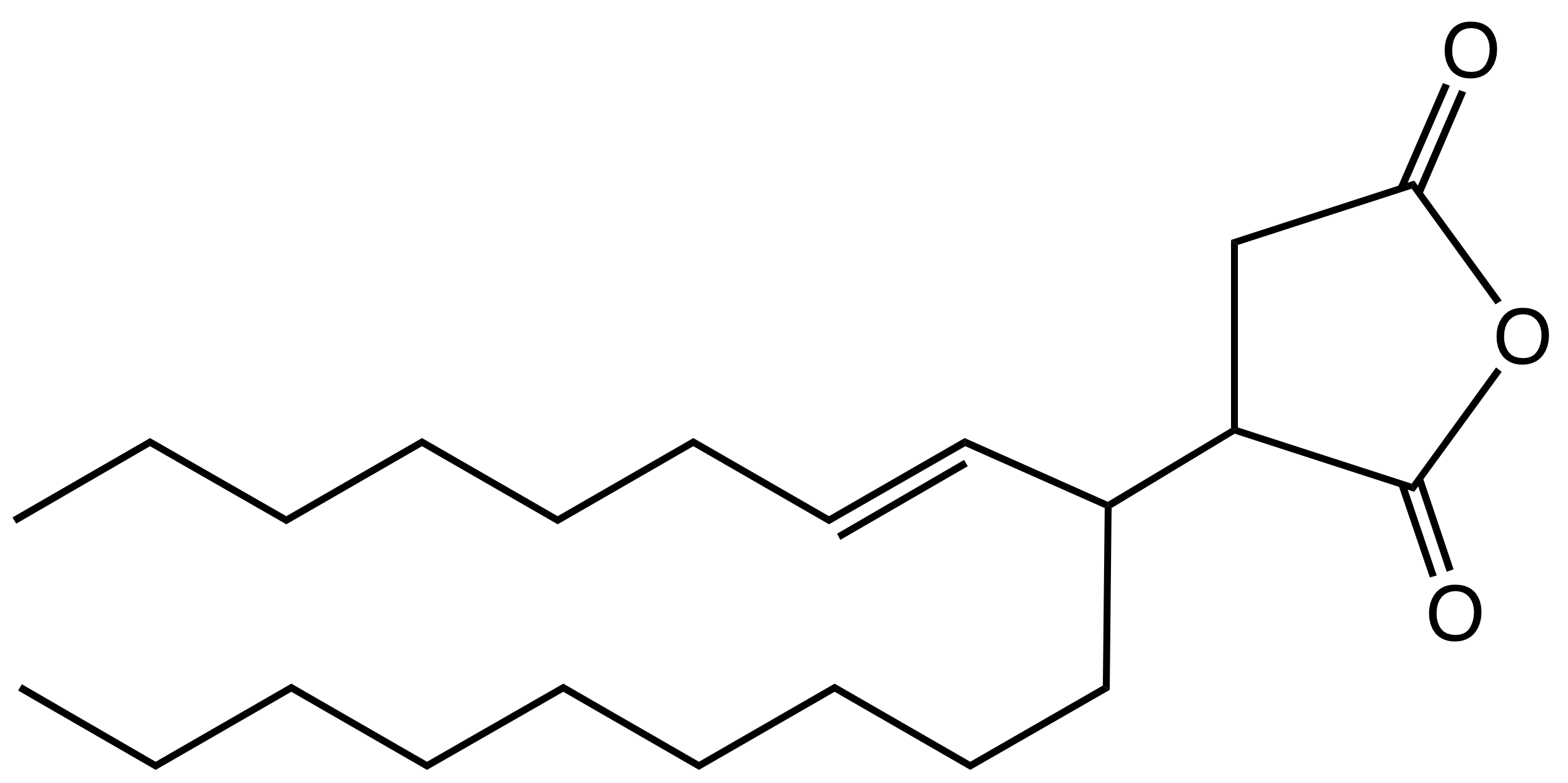
Alkenylsuccinic anhydrides, which are derived from maleic anhydride, are widely used in papermaking

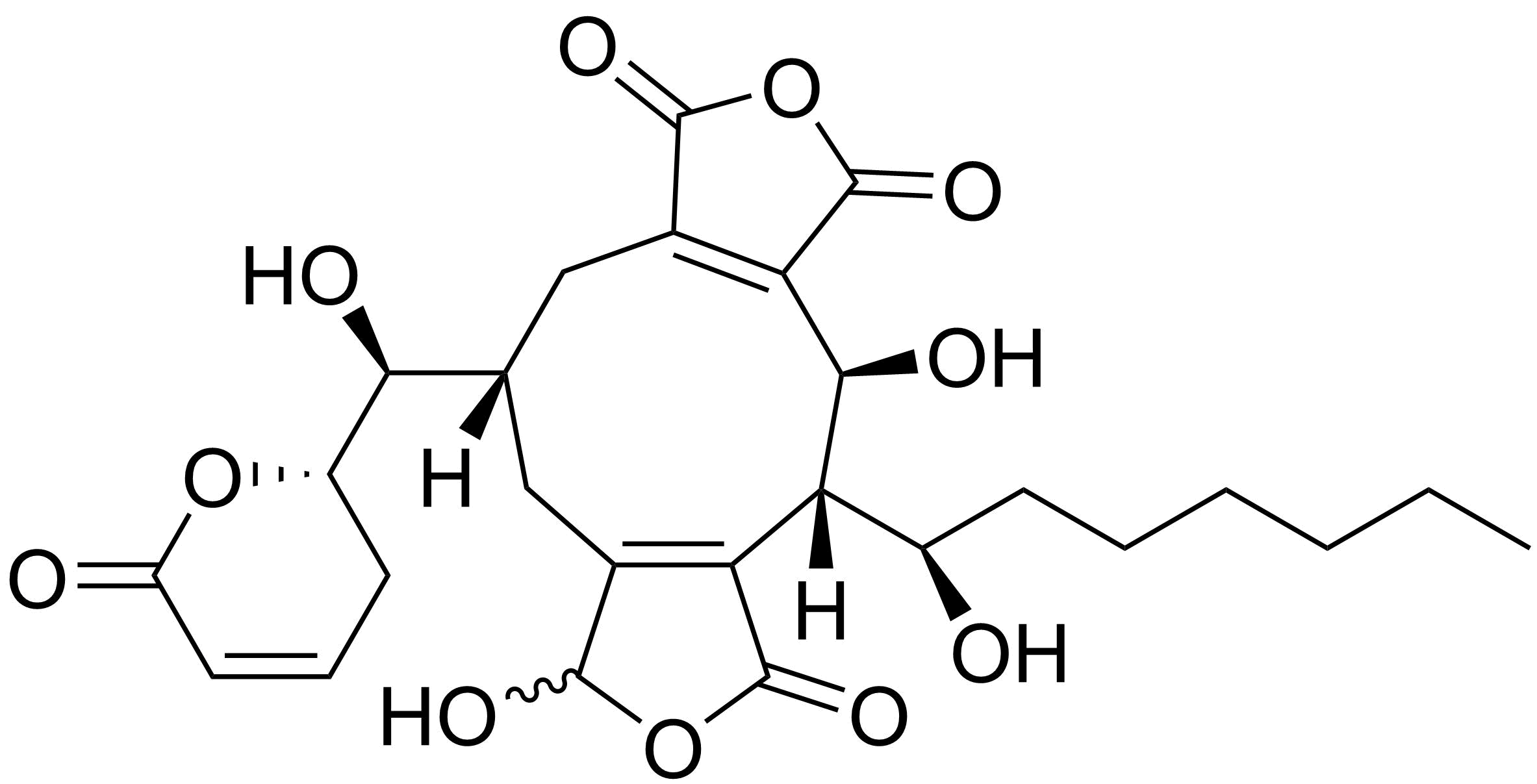
Rubratoxin A is one of many natural products containing a maleic anhydride-like subunit.

=== Plastics & resins ===
Around 50% of world maleic anhydride output is used in the manufacture of unsaturated polyester resins (UPR). These resins are used in diverse applications such as vehicles, construction, furniture, and machinery. Chopped glass fibers are added to UPR to produce fiberglass reinforced plastics.

Maleic anhydride is hydrogenated to 1,4-butanediol (BDO), used in the production of thermoplastic polyurethanes, elastane/Spandex fibers, polybutylene terephthalate (PBT) resins and many other products.

=== Curing agents ===
Diels-Alder reaction of maleic anhydride and butadiene and isoprene gives the respective tetrahydrophthalic anhydrides which can be hydrogenated to the corresponding hexahydrophthalic anhydrides. These species are used as curing agents in epoxy resins. Another market for maleic anhydride is lubricating oil additives, which are used in gasoline and diesel engine crankcase oils as dispersants and corrosion inhibitors. Changes in lubricant specifications and more efficient engines have had a negative effect on the demand for lubricating oil additives, giving flat growth prospects for maleic anhydride in this application.

=== Others ===
A number of smaller applications exist for maleic anhydride. Personal care products consuming maleic anhydride include hair sprays, adhesives and floor polishes. Maleic anhydride is also a precursor to compounds used for water treatment detergents, insecticides and fungicides, pharmaceuticals, and other copolymers.

The maleic anhydride group occurs in several natural products, some of which show promising therapeutic or pesticidal activity. In the wood science, maleic anhydride in combination with other agents, has been used for protection and modification of wood in order to improve its material properties.

=== Production By Region ===
Region	2015
North America	370 kt (410,000 short tons)
South & Central America	46 kt (51,000 short tons)
Western Europe	307 kt (338,000 short tons)
Central & Eastern Europe	60 kt (66,000 short tons)
Asia	1,864 kt (2,055,000 short tons)
Africa	14 kt (15,000 short tons)
Total	2,771 kt (3,055,000 short tons)

Source: Kirk & Othmer

== Packing and transport ==
Liquid maleic anhydride is available in road tankers and/or tank-containers which are made of stainless steel, which are insulated and provided with heating systems to maintain the temperature of 65–75 °C (149–167 °F). Tank cars must be approved for the transport of molten maleic anhydride.

Liquid/molten maleic anhydride is a dangerous material in accordance with RID/ADR.

Solid maleic anhydride pellets are transported by trucks. Packaging is generally in 25 kg (55 lb) polyethylene bags.

== Effects on human health and the environment ==
This compound poses relatively low-risk environmental hazards, an important feature for some applications. In humans, exposure to maleic anhydride may cause irritation to the respiratory tract, eyes, exposed mucosa, and skin. Maleic anhydride is also a skin and respiratory sensitizer.

Maleic anhydride is a low hazard profile chemical. Maleic anhydride rapidly hydrolyzes to form maleic acid in the presence of water and hence environmental exposures to maleic anhydride itself are unlikely. Maleic acid is biodegradable under aerobic conditions in sewage sludge as well as in soil and water.

Food starch for use in night markets sold from a supplier in Tainan city, Taiwan, were found to contain maleic anhydride in December 2013. The supplier was investigated regarding the 300 t (330 short tons) of tainted starch; an earlier inspection in November had found 32 t (35 short tons).
